= George Valentin Bibescu =

Romanian aviation pioneer (1880–1941)

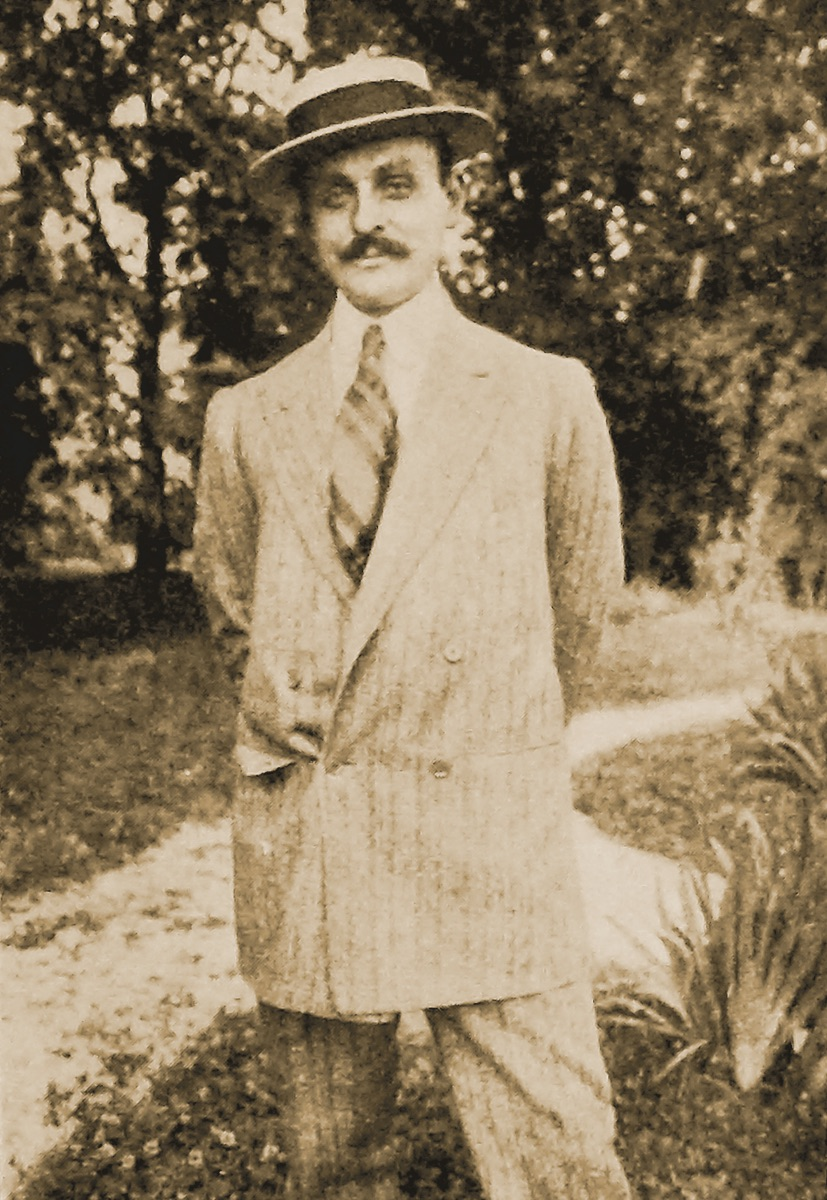
- George Valentin Bibescu, 1911
- Born: George III Valentin, Prince Bibescu; 22 March 1880; Bucharest, Romania
- Died: 2 July 1941 (aged 61); Bucharest, Romania
- Occupations: Aviation pioneer and automobile enthusiast
- Spouse: Marthe Bibesco (m. 1902)
- Children: Valentina
- Parent(s): George Bibescu; Valentine de Riquet de Caraman
- Relatives: Gheorghe Bibescu (grandfather); Joseph de Riquet de Caraman (grandfather); Émilie Pellapra (grandmother); Grégoire Bibesco-Bassaraba (uncle); Joseph de Riquet de Caraman-Chimay (uncle); Joseph, Prince de Caraman-Chimay (cousin); Élisabeth Greffulhe (cousin); Barbu Știrbey (brother-in-law); Léon de Montesquiou (cousin); Anna de Noailles (cousin); Antoine Bibesco (cousin); George Matei Cantacuzino (nephew)

George III Valentin, Prince Bibescu (Romanian pronunciation: [ˈdʒe̯ordʒe valenˈtin biˈbesku]; 22 March 1880 – 2 July 1941) was a Romanian early aviation pioneer and automobile enthusiast.

== Family ==
His parents were Prince George Bibescu (1834–1902; son of Gheorghe Bibescu) and Valentine de Riquet de Caraman. On 29 July 1902, he married Marthe Lucie Lahovary (1886–1973), who took the name Marthe Bibesco. They had one daughter, Valentina, born 27 August 1903. In 1912, he gave his wife as a present the Mogoșoaia Palace.

== Automobiles ==
Bibescu, together with the engineer and explorer Bazil Assan and the baron Barbu Bellu, was the first person to bring an automobile to Romania. The first two requested one from the brand FN Herstal. Since Bibescu did not have the time to register it, in 1900, Assan became the first person in the country to receive a Vehicle registration plate, 1B. However, Bibescu did not want to allow this, so the Capital Prefecture made an exception and gave him in 1901 the plate 0B, making him the owner of the first plate in Romania.

== Early Aviation ==
Bibescu had an early interest in aviation; he flew a balloon named "Romania" brought from France 1905. Later he tried to teach himself how to fly a Voisin airplane, also brought from France, but without success. After Louis Blériot's demonstration flights in Bucharest on 18 October 1909 (organized at the invitation of Romanian Automobile Club, of which he was president), Bibescu went to France and enrolled in Blériot's school in Pau. On 6 January 1910 he was awarded Aéro-Club de France pilot's license number 20. After returning from France, Bibescu organized the Cotroceni Piloting School in Bucharest where Mircea Zorileanu and Nicolae Capșa were licensed. On 14 September 1910, Bibescu flew his Blériot monoplane from Cioroiu island, near Giurgiu, crossing the Danube at a height of 50m, to Ruse in Bulgaria. During October 1911, he flew during military manoeuvres held in the Roman-Pașcani area - among the first times aeroplanes participated in such exercises. On 5 May 1912, he founded the Romanian National Aeronautic League (Liga Naționala Aeriana, LNA) and in 1913 he led a section of aeroplanes from the LNA in flying reconnaissance missions during the Second Balkan War.

== First World War ==
George Valentin Bibescu had joined the military reserve in 1900 in an artillery regiment. After attending Officer's School he was promoted to second lieutenant on 1 July 1901 and then to full lieutenant on 10 May 1907. During the first half of World War One, before Romania joined the war, he was involved in buying materials from Britain and France, but returned to the country once war was declared in 1916. Later that year Bibescu took part in the operations to sabotage the Romanian oil facilities around Ploiești, led by British soldiers John Norton-Griffiths and Colonel Christopher Thomson, that aimed to deny the oil to the advancing Germans. Bibescu drove the British contingent in his personal car and, in January 1917, saved the life of Griffiths in Moreni. For this he was awarded the British Distinguished Service Order in April 1917. According to his tombstone he was a Marine infantry commander on Siret in 1917 and a Motorised Artillery Commander in Budapest in 1918-1919, during the post WW1 Hungarian-Romanian War.

== Founder and member of aeronautic, motoring and sporting organisations ==
He was co-founder of the Romanian Automobile Club (1901), and of the Romanian Olympic Committee (1914) of which he was president from 1920 to 1923. Romania was among the first 6 nations in the world to organize car races. In 1904, he won the Bucharest-Giurgiu-Bucharest auto race, with an average hourly speed of 66 km/h. In 1905, motorists George Valentin Bibescu, Leon Leonida, and Mihai Ferekide, accompanied by Marthe Bibesco, Maria Ferekide, and Claude Anet, made the first automobile trip to Persia, leaving from Galați and reaching Ispahan. The trip is described by the French writer Claude Anet in his book, "La Perse en automobile à travers la Russie et le Caucase (Les Roses d'Ispahan)".

In 1920 Bibescu founded the Royal Aeroclub of Romania, recognised as a legal entity on 13 April 1923. He was instrumental in founding the Fédération Aéronautique Internationale (FAI). Between 1927 and 1930, he was vice-president, and between 1930 and 1941 president of the FAI. In 1927, in his position as head of the FAI, he was presented with a Ford Trimotor, registration CV-FAI, which he named "Comte de La Vaulx" after his predecessor as FAI president, Henry de La Vaulx. In spring 1931 he flew in this aeroplane on a promotional rally from Paris to Calcutta. However, on 17 April 1931 the Ford was attacked by giant eagles, resulting in a forced landing with the death of crew member Radu Beller and several injuries, including to Bibescu.

== Death ==
In the second half of 1940 George Valentin Bibescu was diagnosed with lung cancer and died 2 July 1941. George Bibescu is buried in the small, white 1688 church on the grounds of Mogoșoaia Palace in Romania.

== Gallery ==
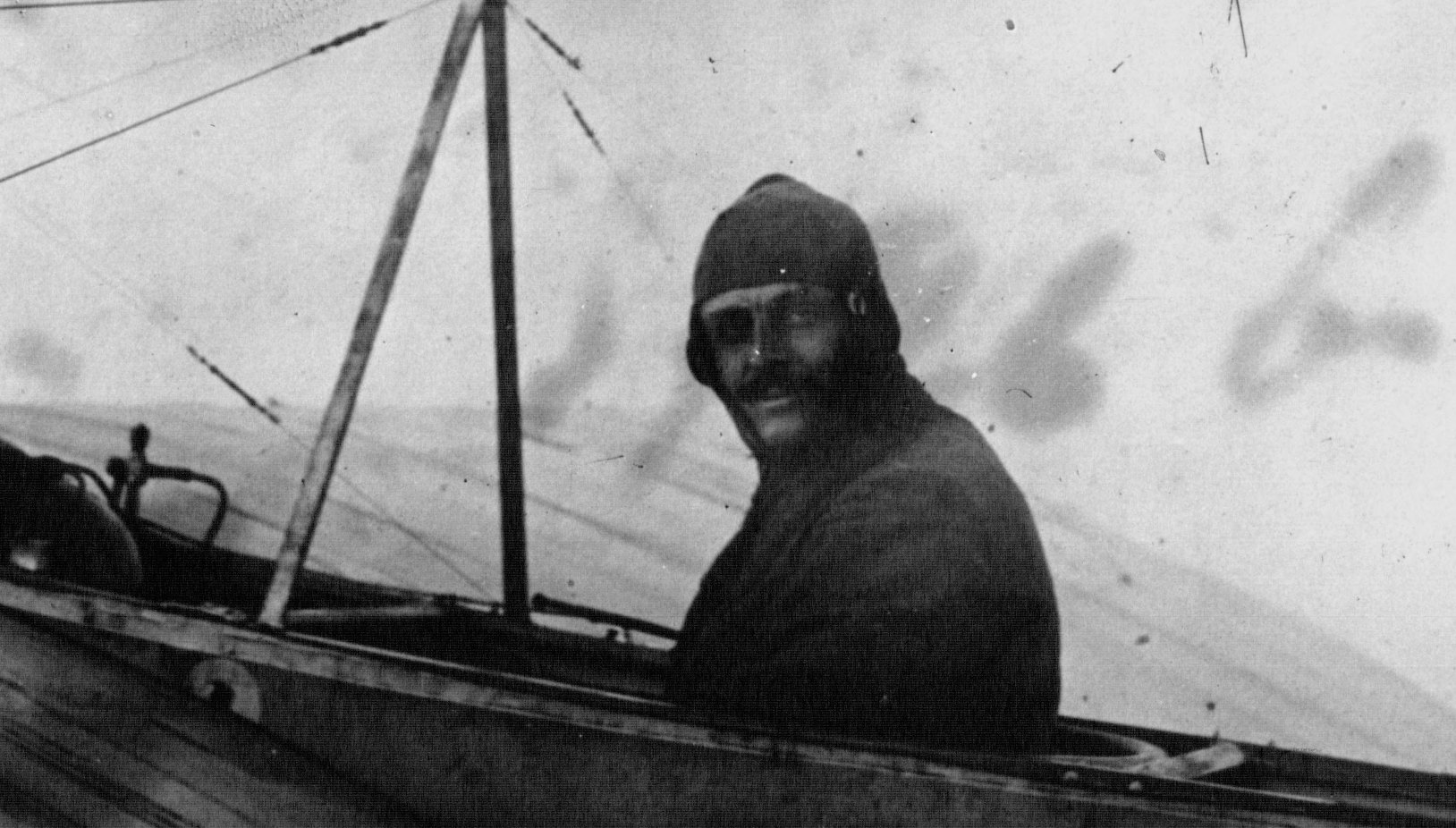
Bibescu training at the Pau Flying School (Blériot Aéronautique).

Bibescu 3rd from left on the side of a Bleriot XI airplane.

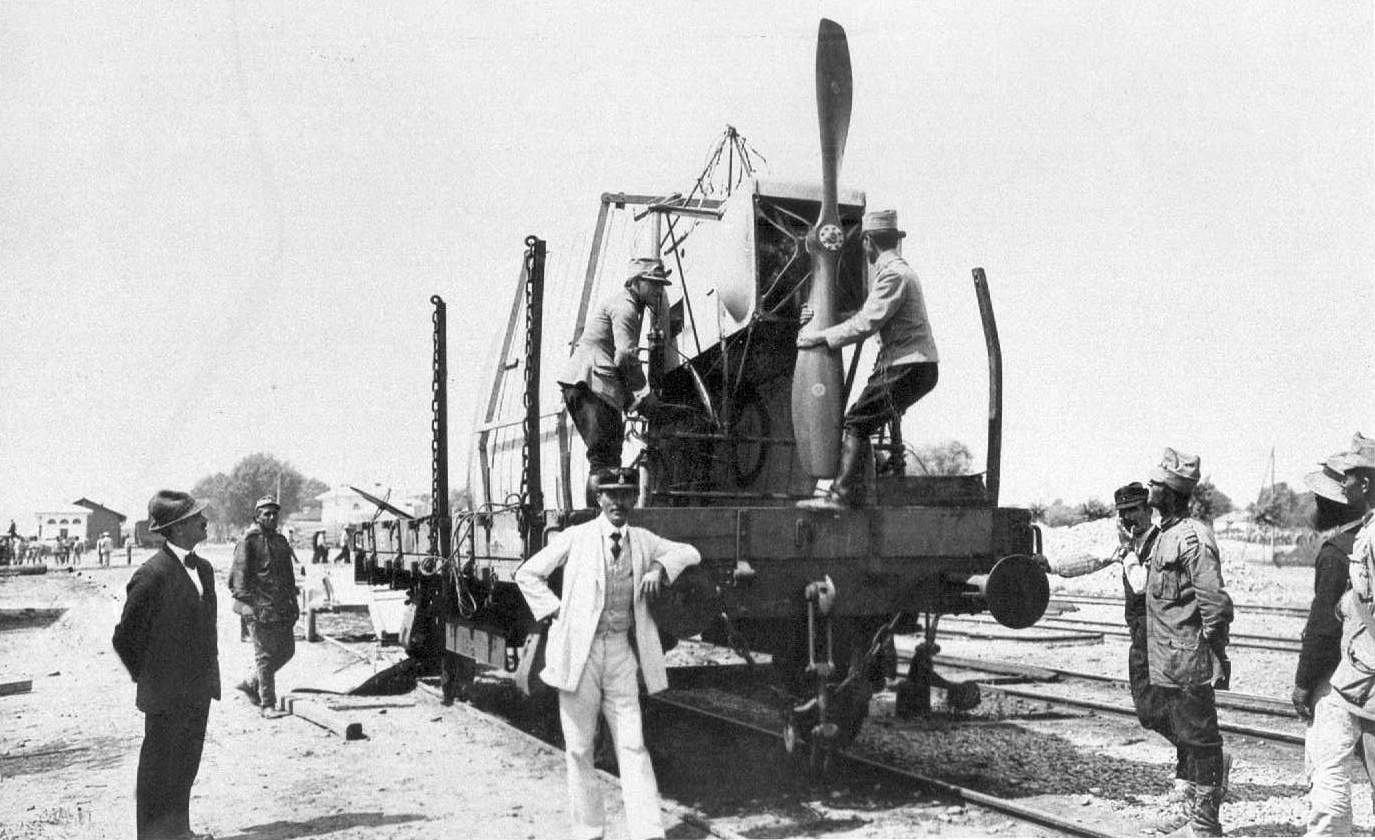
Bibescu with a Blériot plane of the Romanian military during the Second Balkan War. To the left looking at the plane is Aurel Vlaicu.

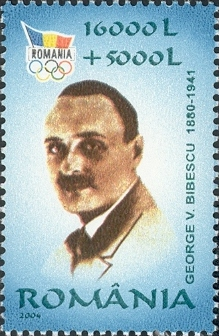
Bibescu on a 2004 Romanian stamp

== See also ==
- History of aviation
- List of aviation pioneers
- Romanian Air Force
