= Joseph de Riquet de Caraman (1808–1886) =

Belgian diplomat and industrialist

- Prince of Chimay
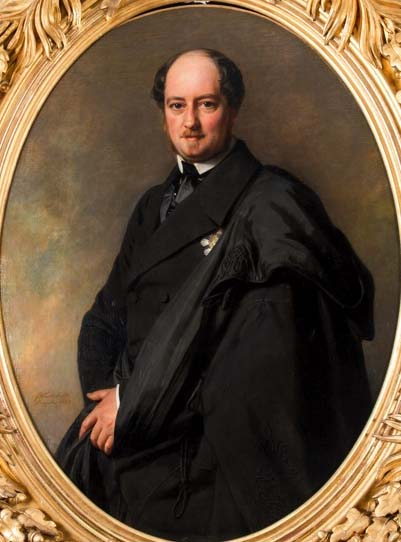
- Portrait of the Prince of Chimay, by Franz Xaver Winterhalter, 1852
- Born: 20 August 1808; Paris, France
- Died: 12 March 1886 (aged 77); London, England
- Spouse: Émilie Pellapra (m. 1830; died 1871)
- Issue: Emilie de Riquet de Caraman; Joseph de Riquet de Caraman; Valentine de Riquet de Caraman; Eugène de Riquet de Caraman
- House: Riquet de Caraman
- Father: François Joseph de Riquet de Caraman
- Mother: Thérésa Cabarrus

Joseph de Riquet de Caraman, 17th Prince de Chimay (20 August 1808 – 12 March 1886) was a Belgian diplomat and industrialist.

== Early life ==
Joseph was the eldest son of François Joseph de Riquet de Caraman, prince de Chimay and his wife Thérésa Cabarrus (Madame Tallien), one of the leaders of Parisian social life during the Directory.

== Career ==
He led the negotiations which led to a treaty of friendship between the Netherlands and Belgium following William I of the Netherlands' abjuration, which guaranteed Belgian independence. He also contributed to establishing Belgium's diplomatic relations with the Grand Duchy of Tuscany, the Kingdom of Naples, the Papal States and the German Confederation. In 1824, he was created Prince of Caraman in the Dutch nobility

In 1852, he acquired the Hôtel de la Pagerie at 17 quai Malaquais, in the 6th arrondissement of Paris, renaming it Hôtel de Chimay. It was sold in 1883 to the École des beaux-arts. In 1863, he built a theatre in his château de Chimay in Belgium, designed by Hector-Martin Lefuel and Cambon and inspired by Louis XV's theatre at the Palace of Fontainebleau.

He financed the foundation of Scourmont Abbey on Chimay lands and in 1858 headed the consortium which founded the Compagnie de Chimay, one of the first Belgian railway companies, which built a line linking Chimay to Anor in France and Mariembourg.

== Personal life ==
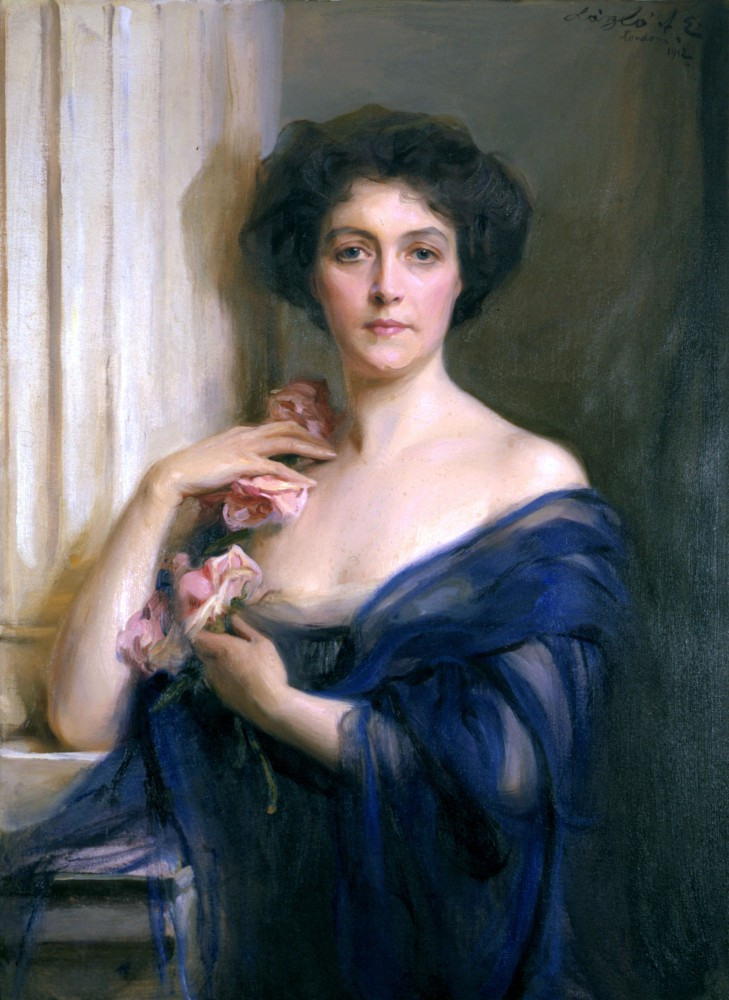
Portrait of his granddaughter, Countess Dionys Széchényi, by Philip de László, 1912

On 30 August 1830, Joseph married Émilie Pellapra (1806–1871) in Paris. The widow of comte de Brigode, she was the daughter of Françoise-Marie LeRoy and Henri de Pellapra, a wealthy financier, although Émilie claimed to be a daughter of Napoleon. Together, Émilie and Joseph had four children:

- Marie Thérèse Emilie de Riquet de Caraman (1832–1851), who married politician Frédéric Lagrange.
- Marie Joseph Guy Henry Philippe de Riquet de Caraman (1836–1892), who married Marie de Montesquiou-Fezensac in 1857. After her death in 1884, he married Mathilde de Barandiaran in 1889.
- Valentine de Riquet de Caraman (1839–1914), who married Prince Paul de Bauffremont, son of Prince Alphonse de Bauffremont, in 1861. They divorced in 1875 and she married Prince Georges Bibescu, a son of the Prince of Wallachia Gheorghe Bibescu, in 1875.
- Eugène de Riquet de Caraman (1847–1881), who married Louise de Graffenried-Villars.

The Prince de Chamay died in London on 12 March 1886.

=== Descendants ===
Through his eldest son Joseph, he was a grandfather of Joseph, Prince de Caraman-Chimay (who married, and divorced, American heiress Clara Ward, and Anne Marie Charlotte Amélie Gilone Le Veneur de Tillières), Élisabeth de Riquet de Caraman-Chimay (who married Henry, Count of Greffulhe), Pierre de Riquet de Caraman-Chimay (who married Marthe Mathilde Barbe Werlé and Jeanne Marie Carraby), Ghislaine de Caraman-Chimay (a lady-in-waiting to Elisabeth, Queen of the Belgians), Marie Joséphine de Riquet de Caraman-Chimay (who married Charles Camille Pochet), and Alexandre de Riquet de Caraman-Chimay (who married Catherine Hélène, Princess Bassaraba de Brancovan, and Mathilde Stuyvesant (née Löwenguth) in 1933, a French widow of an American heir who had previously been married to a Dutch count).

Through his youngest son Prince Eugène, he was a grandfather of Countess Emilie de Caraman et Chimay (1871–1944), who married Hungarian diplomat Count Dionys Széchényi, and Countess Hélène de Caraman et Chimay (1864–1902), who married Anglo-Irish diplomat John Francis Charles, 7th Count de Salis-Soglio.
