= Joseph de Riquet de Caraman-Chimay (1836–1892) =

Belgian politician (1836–1892)

The Prince de Chimay
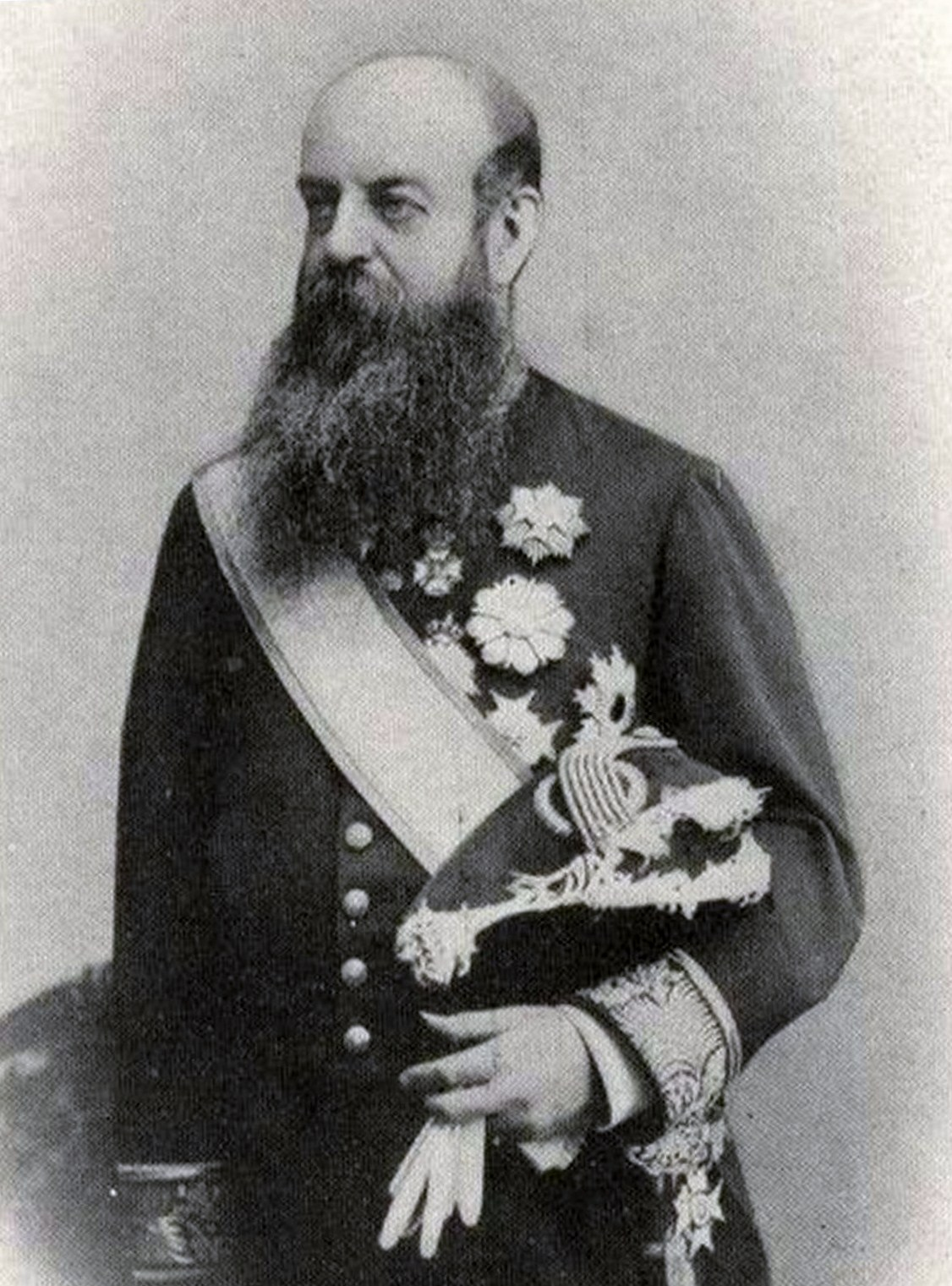
- Portrait c. 1890

Foreign Minister of Belgium
- In office 1884–1892
- Preceded by: Alphonse de Moreau
- Succeeded by: Henri de Mérode-Westerloo

Governor of the Province of Hainaut
- In office 1870–1878
- Preceded by: Louis Troye
- Succeeded by: Auguste Wanderpepen

Belgian Ambassador to the Holy See
- In office 1846–1847
- Preceded by: Charles van den Steen de Jehay
- Succeeded by: Eugène de Ligne

Personal details
- Born: Marie-Joseph-Guy-Henry-Philippe de Riquet de Caraman; 6 October 1836 Château de Menars, Loir-et-Cher, France
- Died: 29 March 1892 (aged 55) Brussels, Belgium
- Party: Catholic Party
- Spouse(s): Marie de Montesquiou-Fezensac (m. 1857; died 1884) Mathilde de Barandiaran (m. 1889; died 1892)
- Parent(s): Joseph de Riquet de Caraman; Émilie Pellapra

Marie-Joseph-Guy-Henry-Philippe de Riquet de Caraman, 18th Prince de Chimay (9 October 1836 – 29 March 1892), was a Belgian diplomat and politician.

== Early life ==
Prince Joseph was born on 9 October 1836 at the Château de Menars in France. He was the eldest son of Belgian diplomat and industrialist Joseph de Riquet de Caraman, 17th Prince de Chimay, and memoirist Émilie Pellapra, the widow of Comte de Brigode. From his parents' marriage, he had three siblings Emilie de Riquet de Caraman (wife of Frédéric Lagrange), Valentine de Riquet de Caraman (wife of Prince Paul de Bauffremont and Prince George Bibescu) and Eugène de Riquet de Caraman (who married Louise de Graffenried-Villars). From his mother's first marriage, he had an elder half-brother, Henri, Marquis of Brigode who was the Mayor of Romilly (and married Annette du Hallay-Coëtquen).

His paternal grandparents were François-Joseph-Philippe de Riquet, 16th Prince de Chimay, and Thérésa de Cabarrus, one of the leaders of Parisian social life during the Directory. His maternal grandparents were Françoise-Marie LeRoy and a wealthy financier Henri de Pellapra, though Émilie claimed to be a daughter of Napoleon. His niece, Hélène Marie de Riquet de Caraman, married John Francis Charles, 7th Count de Salis-Soglio.

== Career ==
The Prince de Chimay served as the Belgian Ambassador to the Holy See from 1846 to 1847. A member of the Catholic Party, he later served as the governor of the province of Hainaut from 1870 to 1878 and Foreign Minister of Belgium from 1884 until his death in 1892.

== Personal life ==
In 1857, he married Marie Joséphine Anatole de Montesquiou-Fezensac (1834–1884), a daughter of Viscount Napoleon de Montesquiou-Fézensac and Anne Elisabeth Cuiller Perron (a daughter of Gen. Pierre Cuillier-Perron). Her brother was the French admiral Bertrand de Montesquiou-Fézenzac. The prince was known to give private concerts, with him on violin and his wife on piano. In memory of one of these at which he had assisted, Franz Liszt dedicated a mass to Caraman-Chimay. Together, they were the parents of six children, including:

- Marie Joseph Anatole Élie de Riquet de Caraman-Chimay (1858–1937), who married sixteen-year-old American heiress Clara Ward, a daughter of Capt. Eber Brock Ward, in 1890. They divorced in 1897 and, after Clara's death, he married Anne Marie Charlotte Amélie Gilone Le Veneur de Tillières in 1920.
- Marie Anatole Louise Élisabeth de Riquet de Caraman-Chimay (1860–1952), who married Henry, Count of Greffulhe.
- Pierre Marie de Riquet de Caraman-Chimay (1862–1913), who married Marthe Mathilde Barbe Werlé, daughter of Alfred Werlé whose family controlled Veuve Clicquot. After her death in 1906, he married Jeanne Marie Carraby, the widow of the Duke of San Lorenzo who was a daughter of Pierre Etienne Carraby.
- Ghislaine Marie Anatole Pauline Henriette de Caraman-Chimay (1865–1955), a lady-in-waiting to Elisabeth, Queen of the Belgians who died unmarried.
- Marie Joséphine Anatole de Riquet de Caraman-Chimay (1870–1961), who married Charles Camille Pochet.
- Alexandre Marie de Riquet de Caraman-Chimay (1873–1951), who married Catherine Hélène, Princess Bassaraba de Brancovan, a daughter of Prince Grégoire, After her death in Paris in 1929, he married Mathilde Stuyvesant (née Löwenguth) in 1933, a French widow of an American heir who had previously been married to a Dutch count.

After the death his wife in 1884, he married Marie Mathilde Lucia Christiana Francisca Paula de Barandiaran (1862–1919), a daughter of Grégoire de Barandiaran and Isabel Cavalcanti de Albuquerque, in 1889. They did not have any issue.

The Prince de Chimay died on 29 March 1892 in Brussels, and was succeeded in his title by his eldest son, Joseph. After his death, his widow married Jacques Benoit Théophile, Comte de Liedekerke de Pailhe, with whom she had a daughter.

Joseph de Riquet de Caraman-Chimay (1836–1892) House of Chimay Born: 12 March 1886 Died: 29 March 1892
Titles of nobility in Belgium
Preceded by Joseph	Prince of Chimay; 1886–1892	Succeeded by Joseph
