= Émilie Pellapra =

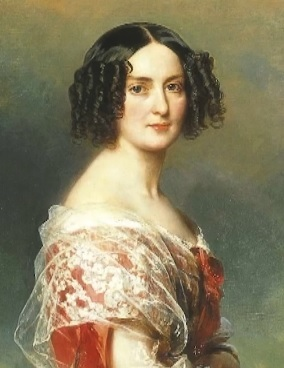
Portrait of the Princess de Chimay, by Franz Xaver Winterhalter, 1849

Émilie Louise Marie Françoise Joséphine Pellapra (11 November 1806 – 22 May 1871), comtesse de Brigode, princesse de Chimay, was the daughter of Françoise-Marie LeRoy and possibly Napoleon I of France. She claimed to be the product of her mother's affair with the French Emperor which supposedly took place in April 1805, but this date is impossible with Émilie's birth in November 1806. She was first married to Count Louis-Marie of Brigode and later married to Prince Joseph de Riquet de Caraman, 17th prince de Chimay.

== Early life ==
She was born in Lyon on November 11, 1806, the daughter of Madame Pellapra, née Françoise-Marie LeRoy, the wife of a rich financier named Henri (de) Pellapra.

For Émilie to have been the daughter of Napoleon it would have been necessary that he stayed in Lyon in February 1806. However, no stay in this city at that time seems to have taken place and, according to several authors (in particular André Gavoty in the Bulletin de l'Institut Napoleon April 1950), Napoleon only met LeRoy in 1810.

== Personal life ==
Émilie married Count Louis Marie de Brigode (1777–1827), a politician under the First French Empire and the Bourbon Restoration. He was from an old noble family from French Flanders and his elder brother Romain-Joseph de Brigode-Kemlandt. Before his early death, they were the parents of twins:

- Fernand de Brigode (1827–1830), who died young.
- Louis Marie Henri Pierre Désiré de Brigode (1827–1859), marquis of Brigode, French peer, Mayor of Romilly; he married Annette du Hallay-Coëtquen (1831–1905).

The Comte de Brigode died in Bourbonne-les-Bains on 22 September 1827, shortly after the birth of their twins.

=== Second marriage ===
She remarried on 30 August 1830 to Prince Joseph de Riquet de Caraman (1808-1886), 17th prince de Chimay, son of Prince François-Joseph-Philippe de Riquet and Thérésa Cabarrus, and had four children:

- Marie Thérèse Émilie de Riquet (1832–1851), who married the politician Frédéric Lagrange and became the countess of Lagrange.
- Marie Joseph Guy Henry Philippe de Riquet, 18th prince de Chimay (1836–1892), who married firstly Marie de Montesquiou-Fezensac, then Mathilde de Barandiaran; father of Marie Joseph Anatole Élie and Élisabeth, comtesse Greffulhe.
- Valentine de Riquet (1839–1914), Comtesse de Caraman-Chimay, first Princess Paul de Bauffremont, then Princess Georges Bibesco.
- Eugène de Riquet (1847–1881), married Louise de Graffenried-Villars; his daughter Hélène Marie married John Francis Charles, 7th Count de Salis-Soglio.

She died at the Château de Menars on May 22, 1871.
