= George Bibescu =

George Bibescu may refer to:

- Gheorghe Bibescu (1804–1873), hospodar (prince) of Wallachia
- George Valentin Bibescu (1880–1941), Romanian early aviation pioneer and automobile enthusiast
