= Grégoire Bibesco-Bassaraba =

Romanian-French prince

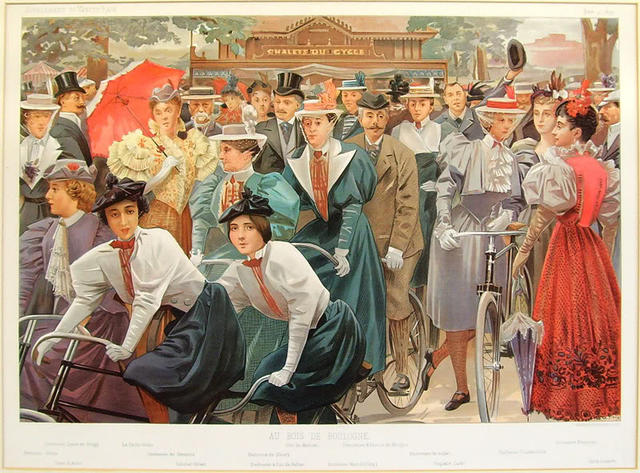
His wife, Ralouka, appears in a fashionable crowd in the Bois de Boulogne drawn by Guth, 1897.

Prince Grégoire Bibesco-Bassaraba de Brancovan (12 December 1827 – 15 October 1886) was a Romanian-French prince.

== Early life ==
Prince Grégoire was born in Craiova on 12 December 1827 and was a son of Romanian prince Georges Bibesco (Gheorghe Bibescu) and Princess Zoé Bassaraba de Brancovan (Brâncoveanu).

== Personal life ==
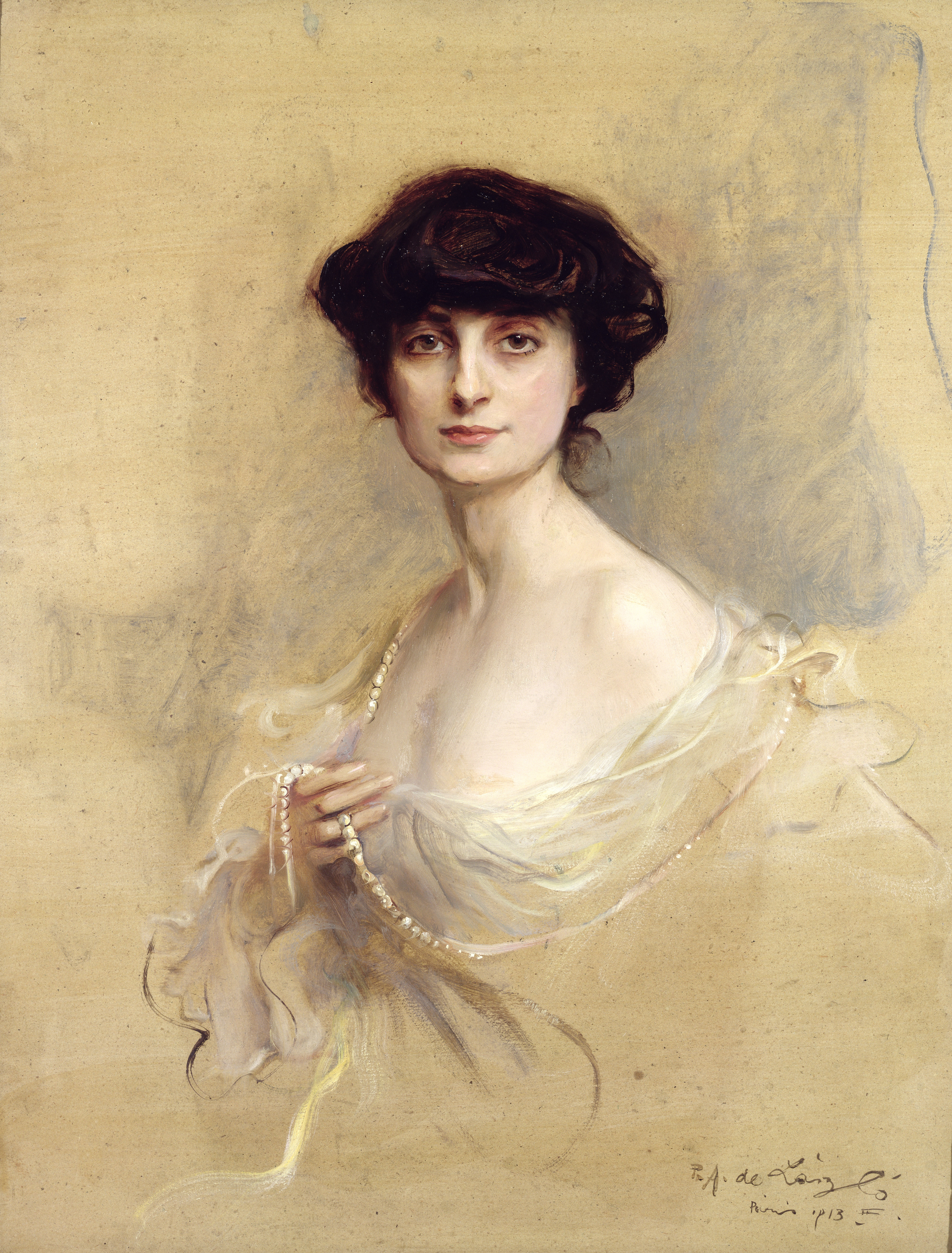
His daughter, Anna, Comtesse de Noailles, by Philip de László, 1913.

He married Rakoul (Rachel) Musurus (born c. 1848), the daughter of Pasha Constantine ('Costaki') Musurus (1807–1891) the Ottoman ambassador to Britain, and his wife Anna Vogoridès. He was a relative of Romanian ambassador Prince Antoine Bibesco, husband of Elizabeth Lucy Asquith, who was the daughter of the prime minister of the United Kingdom H. H. Asquith. Prince Grégoire and his wife Rachel had three children:

- Prince Constantine Bibesco-Bassaraba de Brancovan (1875–1967)
- Princess Anna Elisabeth Bibesco-Bassaraba de Brancovan (1876–1933), who married Conste Mathieu Frederic Ferdinand garcal de Noailles in Paris On July 29, 1897. Anna Elizabeth was a contemporary of Marcel Proust and a prominent figure in Parisian society.
- Princess Catherine Hélène Bibesco-Bassaraba de Brancovan (1878–1929), who married Belgian Prince Alexandre de Caraman-Chimay (1873–1951), a son of Joseph de Caraman-Chimay, 18th Prince de Chimay and brother of Élisabeth, Countess Greffulhe and Joseph, Prince de Caraman-Chimay (married to American heiress Clara Ward). After Princess Hélène's death in 1929, Prince Alexandre married Mathilde Stuyvesant (widow of American millionaire Rutherfurd Stuyvesant).

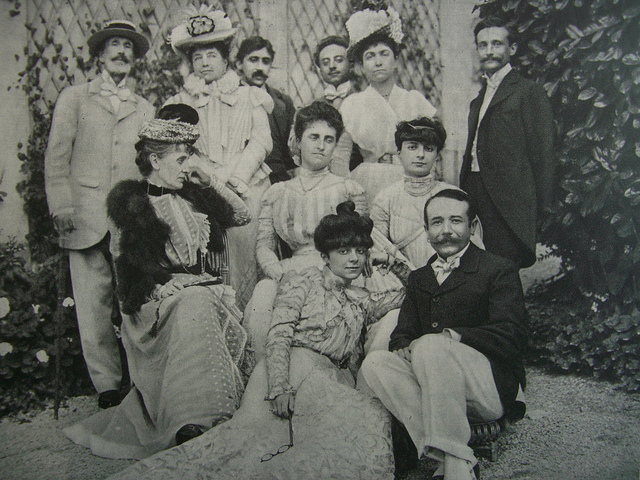
From left to right, standing: Prince Edmond de Polignac, Princess of Brancovan, Marcel Proust, Prince Constantin Brancovan (brother of Anna de Noailles), and Léon Delafosse. 2nd row: Madame de Montgenard, Princesse de Polignac, Countess Anna de Noailles, 1st row: Princess Hélène Caraman-Chimay (sister of Anna de Noailles), Abel Hermant

Their home, Villa Bassaraba just west of Évian at Amphion-les-Bains, was a gathering place for music and poetry lovers, including Marcel Proust, Prince Edmond de Polignac, the Princess de Polignac (formerly Winnaretta Singer, a daughter of Singer sewing machine fortune founder Isaac Singer), Prince Antoine Bibesco, and the novelist Abel Hermant.

Prince Gregoire died in Paris on 15 October 1886.

=== Descendants ===
Through his daughter Hélène, he was a grandfather of Prince Marc-Adolphe de Caraman-Chimay (1903–1992).
