= Louis Marie Joseph de Brigode =

French politician

Louis Marie Joseph de Brigode (21 October 1776, Lille - 22 September 1827, Bourbonne-les-Bains) was a French politician under the First French Empire and the Bourbon Restoration. He was from an old noble family from French Flanders and his elder brother Romain-Joseph de Brigode-Kemlandt was also a nobleman and politician. He is also notable as the first husband of Émilie Pellapra.

== Sources ==
- (in French) « Louis Marie Joseph de Brigode », dans Robert et Cougny, Dictionnaire des parlementaires français, 1889
