= Élisabeth Greffulhe =

French socialite

Élisabeth de Riquet de Caraman-Chimay
- Countess Greffulhe
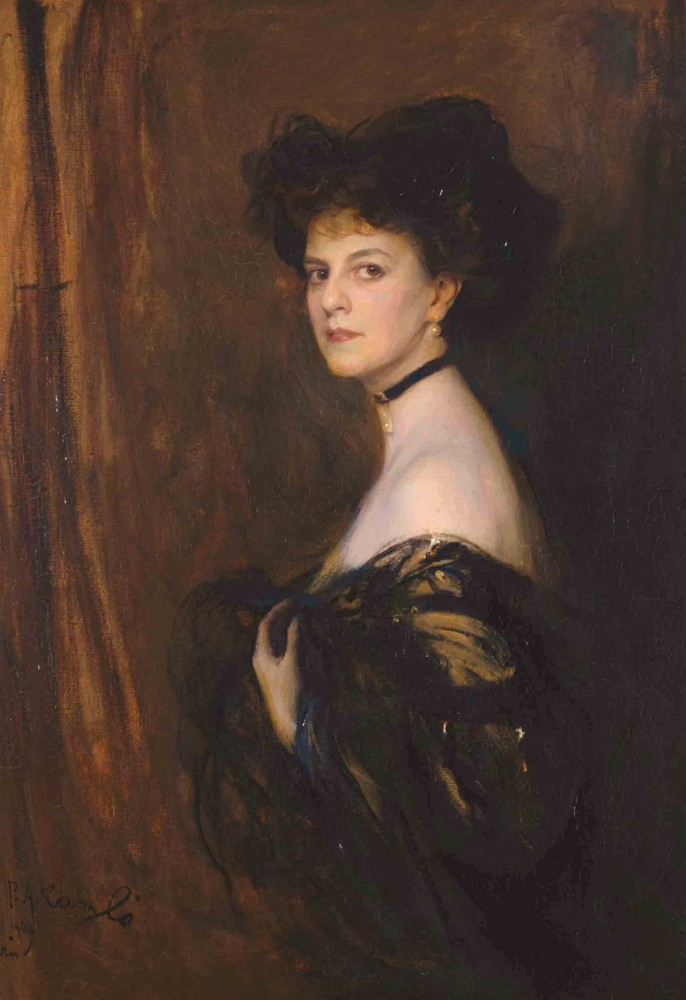
- Portrait by Philip de László, 1905
- Born: 11 July 1860; Paris, France
- Died: 21 August 1952 (aged 92); Lausanne, Switzerland
- Husband: Henry Greffulhe (m. 1878; died 1932)
- Issue: Élaine Greffulhe
- Father: Joseph de Riquet de Caraman
- Mother: Marie de Montesquiou-Fézensac

Countess Marie Anatole Louise Élisabeth Greffulhe (née de Riquet de Caraman-Chimay; 11 July 1860 – 21 August 1952) was a French socialite, a renowned beauty and queen of the salons of the Faubourg Saint-Germain in Paris.

== Life ==
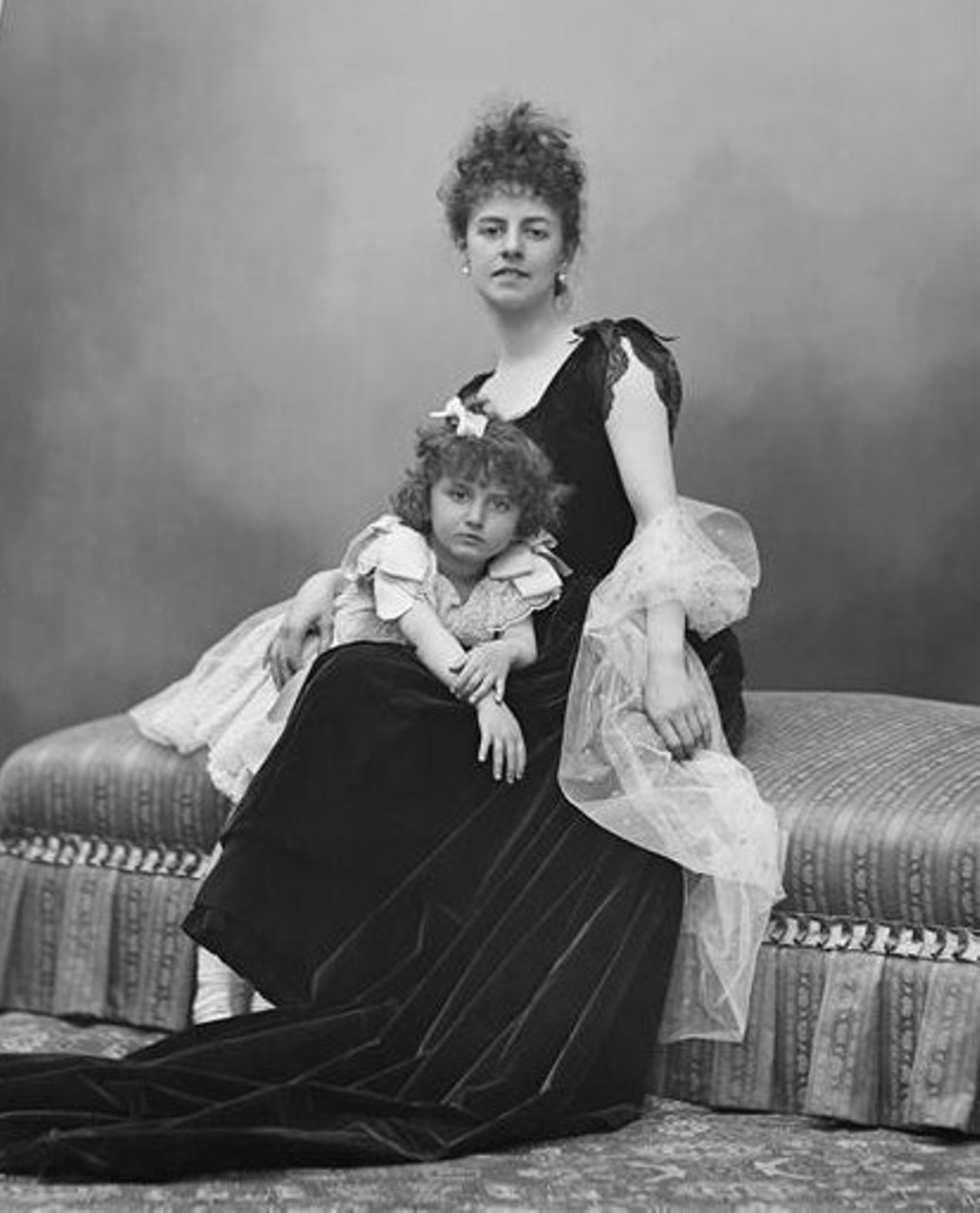
Portrait of Élisabeth, with her daughter Élaine, 1886.

She was born in Paris, the daughter of Joseph de Riquet de Caraman, 18th Prince de Chimay (1836–1892) and his wife, Marie de Montesquiou-Fézensac (1834–1884). Through her father, she was a great granddaughter of Teresa Cabarrús, one of the leaders of Parisian social life during the French Directory (1795-1799), and a granddaughter of memoirist Émilie Pellapra, who claimed to be a daughter of Napoleon.

The countess greatly enjoyed the company of her cousin, the exquisite aesthete Count Robert de Montesquiou, in concert with whom she was in contact with the cream of Parisian society, whom she regularly entertained at her salon in the rue d'Astorg. He would describe her eyes as "black fireflies". The colour of her eyes was unusual; as Mina Curtiss, who visited her, noticed, her eyes were like "the dark purple brown-tinged petals of a rarely seen pansy."

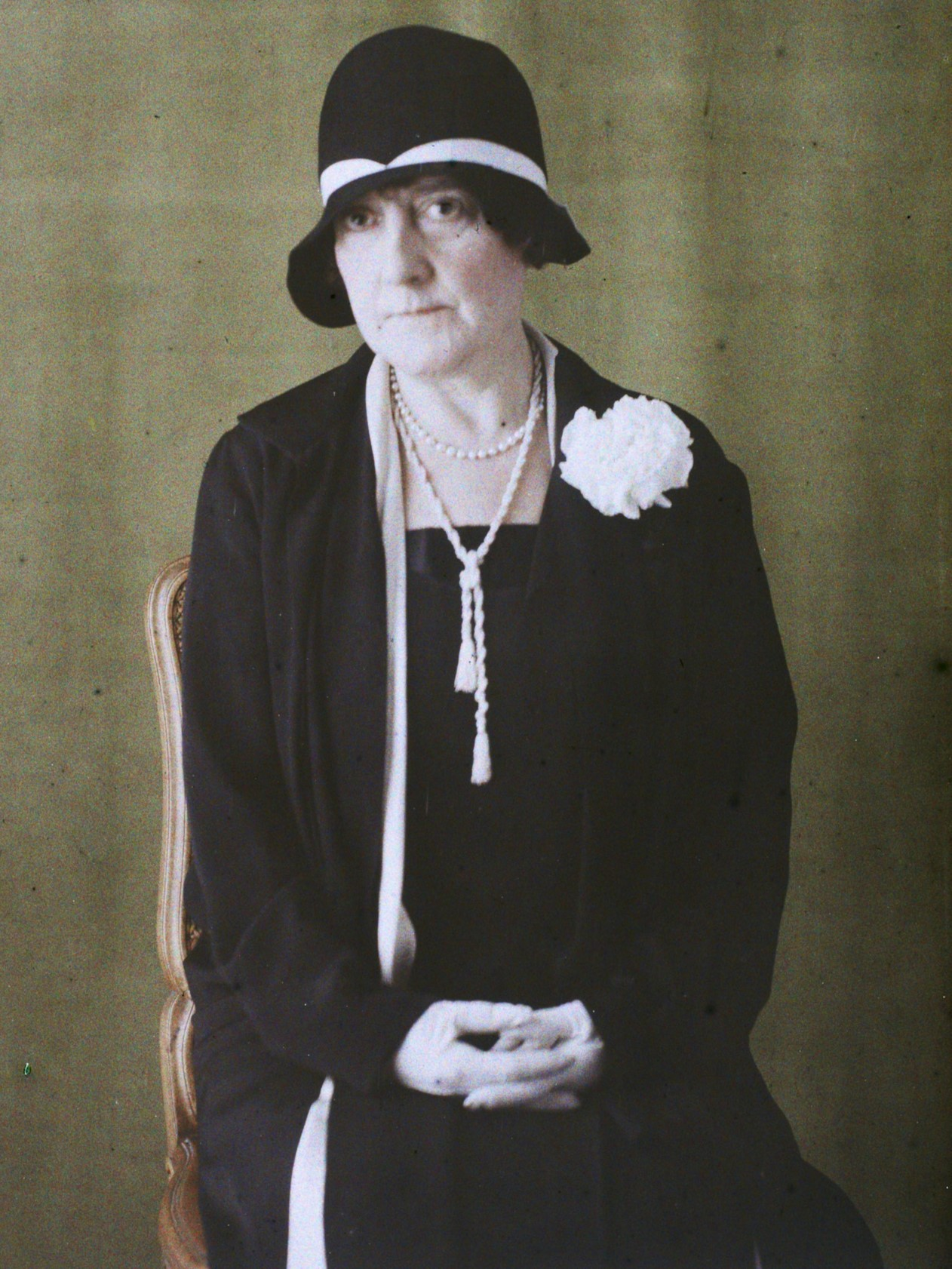
Autochrome portrait by Georges Chevalier, 1929

She married Henri, Count Greffulhe (1848–1932), of the Belgian family of bankers, on 28 September 1878. He was an unfaithful, quick-tempered man. They had one daughter, Élaine (1882–1958), who married Armand, 12th Duke of Gramont, half-brother of the openly bisexual writer the Duchess of Clermont-Tonnerre, who wrote about Élisabeth: "The Comtesse Greffulhe is always beautiful and always elsewhere. But it would be a mistake to think that her life was merely the pursuit of pleasure (...) not only is she beautiful, but she is a lady. Preferring the privacy of her own house in the rue d'Astorg and at Bois-Boudran in the country, the Comtesse Greffulhe never dined out except at the British Embassy. When Edward VII came to Paris, he dined informally at her house. After a restricted youth (...) she set herself to attracting musicians, scholars, physicists, chemists, doctors."

The countess helped establish the art of James Whistler, and she actively promoted such artists as Auguste Rodin, Antonio de La Gandara and Gustave Moreau. She was the subject of paintings and drawings by Paul César Helleu, Antonio de La Gandara, Carolus-Duran, Eugène Lami, Philip de László, Aimé Morot and others, whereas Louis-Julien Franceschi carved her bust in white Carrara marble.

Gabriel Fauré dedicated to her his Pavane, which received its first full performance, with the optional chorus, at a garden party she held in the Bois de Boulogne. She was a patron of Sergei Diaghilev's Ballets Russes, and launched a fashion for greyhound racing. Fascinated by science, she helped Marie Curie to finance the creation of the Institute of Radium, and Édouard Branly to pursue his research on radio transmission and telemechanical systems.

Dieppe became a fashionable seaside resort for Parisian and London society in the mid-19th century. Since at least the 1860s, many musicians found work there at the theatre or casino (see "Casino de Dieppe" on Wikipedia in French for details on the history of the orchestra of the casino), during the summer months when the Parisian establishments were idle. In 1887, E. Greffulhe acquired a villa there, "La Case": this vast Anglo-Norman-style building is featured in Monet's painting "La Falaise à Dieppe".

She is one of the main inspirations for the character of the duchesse de Guermantes in Marcel Proust's À la recherche du temps perdu. Her husband, Count Greffulhe, is the main and almost unique inspiration for the character of the duc de Guermantes. A recent biography demonstrates – relying in particular on research into the author's draft notebooks – that Countess Greffulhe and her family, who inspired several of the characters in À la recherche du temps perdu, played a major role in the genesis of the work and in the discovery of the "magic" name of Guermantes.

She died in Lausanne, Switzerland, on 21 August 1952.

== E. Greffulhe and music ==
Elisabeth Greffuhle put music at the centre of her life. She organized a benefit concert for the Société philanthropique during the 1889 Paris World's Fair featuring Handel's Messiah (in French, and in the Mozart arrangement) in the grand hall of the Trocadéro Palace, on June 10, 1889, with Rose Caron, Blanche Deschamps-Jéhin, Edmond Vergnet and Numa Auguez, with organist Gabriel Fauré, all under the direction of Auguste Vianesi.

The Société des Grandes Auditions musicales de France was "founded [in 1890] and chaired by Mme la comtesse Greffulhe, under the artistic patronage of MM. Gounod, Ambroise Thomas, Léger, Massenet, Delibes, etc." It disappeared in 1913. Its raison d'être was "the theatrical performance of unknown masterpieces" paid for by generous donors including composer Prince Edmond de Polignac or President Sadi Carnot. Greffulhe collaborated with Gabriel Astruc to produce the many concerts she organized.

The first opera given as part of the Grandes Auditions was Berlioz's Béatrice et Bénédict, in 1891, given 5 or 6 times at the Odéon, conducted by Charles Lamoureux, in a French premiere.

Les Troyens was performed at the Opéra-Comique in June and September 1892, in its entirety for the first time since its creation, and this time with great success.

In 1899 she gave a series of performances of Tristan and Isolde with Étienne Gibert and Félia Litvinne (Isolde) directed by Charles Lamoureux.

The first complete performance of Götterdämmerung in France took place on May 17, 1902, at the Théâtre du Château-d'Eau (the one on rue de Malte, directed by Victor Silvestre, not the one on rue du Château-d'Eau). These performances were organized under the patronage of the Société des Grandes auditions musicales, by Alfred Cortot and the impresario Willy Schütz." In June 1902, as part of the Festival lyrique, Wagner's Tristan and Isolde was performed, with Ada Adini or Félia Litvinne (Isolde) and Ernest Van Dyck (Tuesday) or Charles Dalmorès (Tristan, Thursday and Saturday), conducted by Alfred Cortot. The show also took place at the Château-d'Eau, also on the initiative of Countess Greffuhle.

In 1903 she organized performances of La Damnation de Faust, probably from January to the end of May, at the Théâtre Sarah-Bernardt, with Albert Alvarez (Faust), Maurice Renaud (Méphisto) and Emma Calvé (Marguerite) directed by Colonne.

In April 1903, she gave Beethoven's "Mass in D", "preceded by an almost complete performance of Tristan and Isolde conducted by Cortot and also large excerpts from "Parsifal", at the Nouveau-Théâtre, under Cortot's direction.

E. Greffuhle still continued her fund-raising activities, as announced by Le Temps in December 1904 : "A major artistic event has been organized for Thursday January 26 [1905] at the Théâtre Sarah-Bernhardt to benefit the families of the Port-Arthur combatants. The patronage committee already includes the following personalities: Countess Greffulhe...". Pierre Carolus-Duran (the painter's son) conducted the orchestra.

Robert de Montesquiou introduced E. Greffuhle, in addition to Marcel Proust, to a composer whose career was struggling to take off: Gabriel Fauré. Fauré premiered his Tantum Ergo in 1904, at the wedding of the countess's daughter, who was also the dedicator of the Pavane.

E. Greffuhle organized the young Arthur Rubinstein's first concerts in Paris, debuting on November 28, 1904 at the Nouveau-Théâtre, notably in Camille Saint-Saëns' Concerto in G minor, in the presence of the enthusiastic composer.

In 1905 E. Greffuhle was entrusted with the organisation of the Chorégies d'Orange, at the Roman Theatre of Orange, which took place on August 5, 6 and 7. She received the help of Antony Réal (the son), Raoul Gunsbourg (in charge of the artistic organisation) and Paul Mariéton. The programme included Hector Berlioz's "Les Troyens", which had not been performed since the 1892 revival at the Opéra-Comique and Boito's "Mefistofele", and also Shakespeare's Julius Caesar, performed with incidental music from Fauré's Caligula, Op. 52 (1888), and a second play, Oedipus Rex, with incidental music by Edmond Membrée, by the Colonne orchestra.

Also in 1905, but in Paris, E. Greffuhle had five Italian operas performed at the Théâtre Sarah-Bernhardt: Adriana Lecouvreur, L'Amico Fritz, Zaza, Fedora, and Siberia (Giordano).

The Dream of Gerontius, the oratorio by Newman and Elgar, was first performed in France on May 25, 1906 at the Palais du Trocadéro, Paris, under the direction of Camille Chevillard. It was organized by the Société des grandes auditions musicales de France, still chaired by Countess Greffulhe.

On May 8, 1907, at the Théâtre du Châtelet, Richard Strauss conducted the first performance of his opera Salome (in German) with the Colonne Orchestra. The critic of Le Ménestrel, Arthur Pougin, was stingy with compliments, sparing only the interpretation of Emmy Destinn (Salome), "absolutely first-rate", Fritz Feinhals (Jochanaan), who "displayed excellent diction", and the dancer who performed the "Dance of the Seven Veils", Natalia Vladimirovna Trouhanowa. He added that "It goes without saying that the orchestra, under the direction of the composer, is excellent" and concluded thus: "And now that the Société des grandes auditions musicales de France has given us English music, Italian music, German music, and is about to offer us Russian music, couldn't it give some thought to French music?"

Also in 1907, Sergei Diaghilev founded his own Ballets Russes company. Countess Greffulhe introduced him to Gabriel Astruc, and together they organized five concerts of Russian music in Paris from May 16 to 30, 1907, under the patronage of the Société des Grandes auditions musicales de France, with the choirs and orchestra of the Association des Concerts Lamoureux conducted by Arthur Nikisch, Camille Chevillard and Felix Blumenfeld, with Nicolai Rimsky-Korsakov, Alexander Glazunov and Sergei Rachmaninoff, as well as Félia Litvinne, Feodor Chaliapin, Elisabeth Petrenko and Dmitri Smirnov. In May and June 1908, they performed Modest Mussorgsky's Boris Godunov at the Palais Garnier starring Feodor Chaliapin (and Smirnov, Vladimir Kastorsky, Ivan Altchevsky, Natalia Ermolenko-Yuzhina, E. Petrenko), conducted by Felix Blumenfeld.

And in 1909, the first season of the Ballets russes took place at the Théâtre du Châtelet, from May 18 to June 18, under the patronage of the Société des grandes auditions. On the programme were Nikolai Tcherepnin's most famous ballet, Le Pavillon d'Armide with Anna Pavlova in the role of Armida and Vaslav Nijinsky as her slave; The Polovtsian Dances from Prince Igor and Le Festin (Mikhail Glinka and other Russian composers). A journalist noted that "when the dancer [Nijinksky], dressed in a novel way, performed his first leap in the air, the audience, amazed by this flying man who seemed not to touch the ground, cheered him. It was a triumphant success..."

The Ballets russes returned every year until 1914 (and again after the war, by which time the Société des grandes auditions had disappeared). One of the most memorable performances was the world premiere of The Rite of Spring a few weeks after the inauguration of the Théâtre des Champs-Élysées, in May 1913.

In 1908 there was a grand party in the gardens of the Château de Versailles with actors from the Comédie-Française performing extracts from plays and reciting poems (including a sonnet by Count Robert de Montesquiou, the Countess's uncle) and, for the musical part (and ballet), Paul Vidal's Danses antiques; an aria from Alceste, an entrée from Rameau's Hippolyte et Aricie; the Gavotte from Armide, Gabriel Fauré's Pavane and a Minuet by Handel, before a Louis XV-style fireworks display on the Grand Canal. The evening was reserved for members of the Société des Grandes Auditions musicales de France, but 200 seats were sold for the benefit of the charity 'Assistance par le travail', whose aim was to provide an immediate salary for workers without a job. The programme was written by Pierre de Nolhac and decorated by Gaston La Touche. The Countess had arranged a special train for the return journey to Paris, and a car park for the cars (the Countess's car was electric).

On the evening of 18 July 1909, having been unable to organise a Venetian festival on the Grand Canal of Versailles, E. Greffuhle settled for a grand celebration at Bagatelle, with the first part featuring two overtures (L'Arlésienne and Le Roi d'Ys) played by the band of the 1er régiment du génie (then based in Versailles), conducted by Auguste Verbregghe. This was followed by the recreation of Rameau's Anacréon, with Lucie Vauthrin, Rodolphe Plamondon, tenor, Edgard Monys (baritone, from the Schola Cantorum: Anacréon), and the Compagnie des Chanteurs de Saint-Gervais. The Opéra Orchestra and Ballet were conducted by Charles Bordes. The third part included an excerpt from Gounod's Polyeucte, followed by early music again, this time by Gluck, with a Suite de ballet, arias from Iphigénie en Aulide, the Musette and the Sicilienne from Armide. The concert ended with the Venusberg (Prologue to Richard Wagner's Tannhaüser, with Miss Carlyle (Venus) and M. Dubois (tenorino), the chorus, the corps de ballet (conducted by Léo Staats) and the Opéra orchestra, conducted by Paul Vidal. This was followed by a grand fireworks display by the company Ruggieri, lighting and effects were provided by Paz et Silva. The evening was organised by Raoul Gunsbourg.

E. Greffuhle also organized the first Parisian performance of Gustav Mahler's Second Symphony, with the composer conducting the Orchestre Colonne, at the Théâtre du Châtelet, on April 17, 1910.

On Thursday 27 April and 3 May 1911, Le Jugement universel, an oratorio by Don Lorenzo Perosi, was played at the Palais du Trocadéro, with Félia Litvinne, Povla Frijsh, Gabriel Paulet, and 200 performers, conducted by the composer - the show was announced in newspapers in their "Charity" section.

On 18 December 1915, a performance organised by E. Greffuhle and Jacques Rouché, director of the Paris Opera, in aid of the British Red Cross, with Diaghilev and his Ballets Russes, took place at the Paris Opera. The programme included Scheherazade (music by Rimsky-Korsakov, new sets by Léon Bakst); The Firebird, which Stravinsky conducted for the first time in Paris; dances from Prince Igor (Borodin); and Snegurochka).

On 19 November 1916, Countess Greffuhle, now founding president of the 'Union pour la Belgique et les pays alliés et amis' (Union for Belgium and friendly allied countries), organised a support ceremony in La Madeleine church, with Gabriel Fauré playing his Elégie on the great organ, accompanied by ten cellos. This seems to have been the Countess's swan song, so to speak.

She also had a romantic (probably platonic) involvement with composer Roffredo Caetani.

== Gallery ==
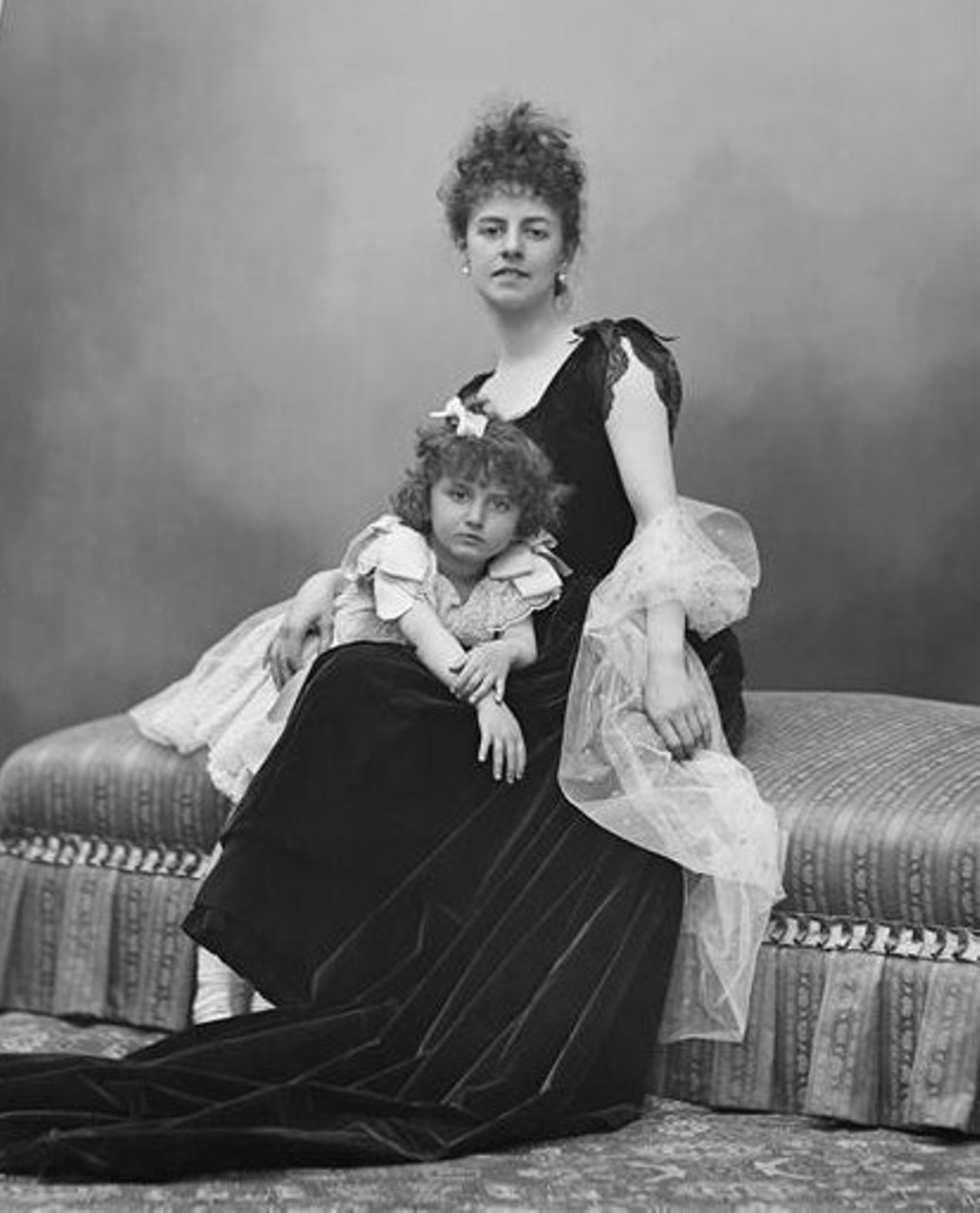
Élisabeth de Caraman-Chimay, Countess Greffulhe (1860-1952) with her daughter Élaine. Photograph by Paul Nadar, 1886.

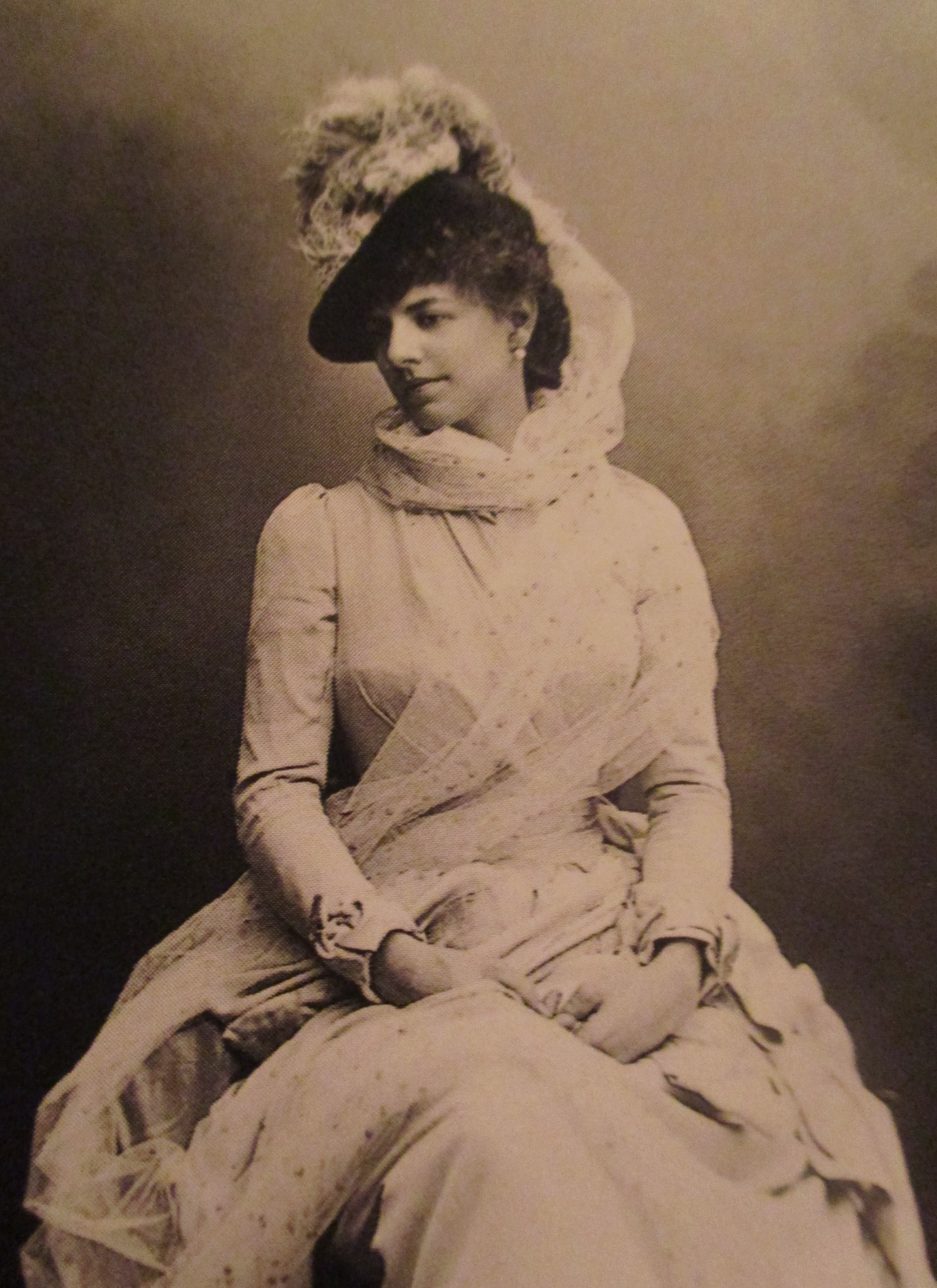
Élisabeth de Caraman-Chimay, Countess Greffulhe (1860-1952). Photograph by Paul Nadar, 1886.

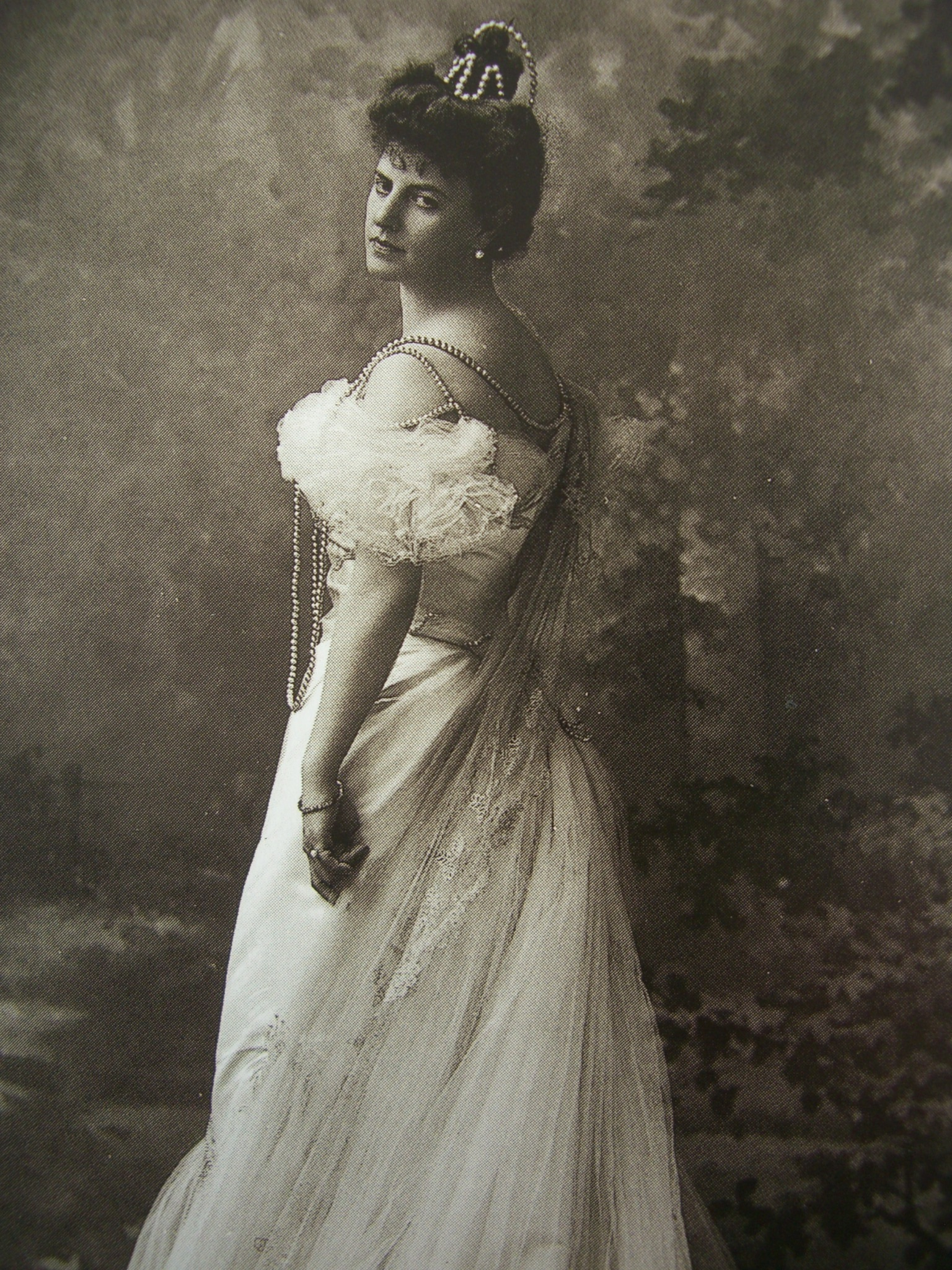
Élisabeth de Caraman-Chimay, Countess Greffulhe (1860-1952). Photograph by Paul Nadar.

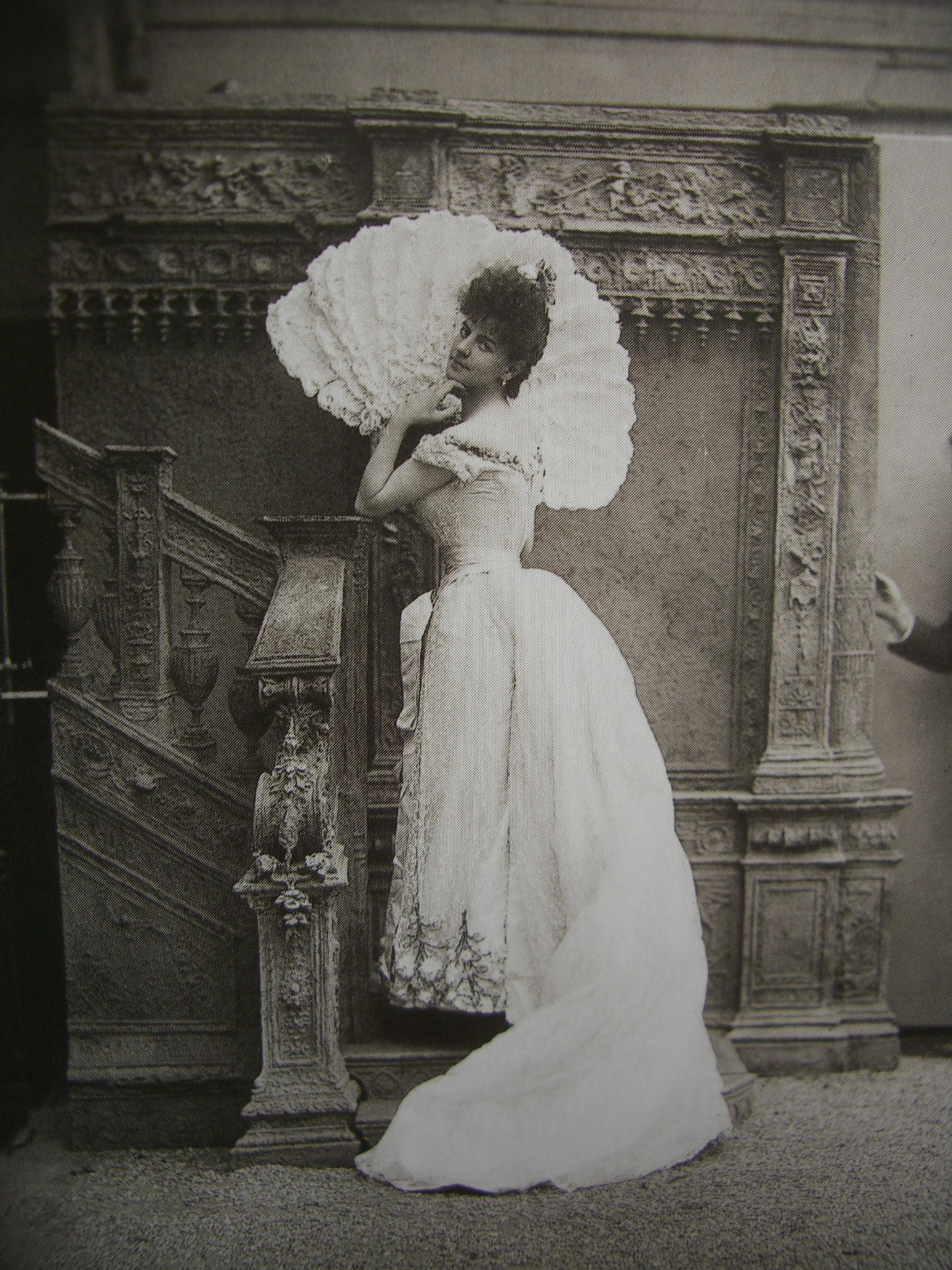
Élisabeth de Caraman-Chimay, Countess Greffulhe (1860-1952). Photograph by Paul Nadar.

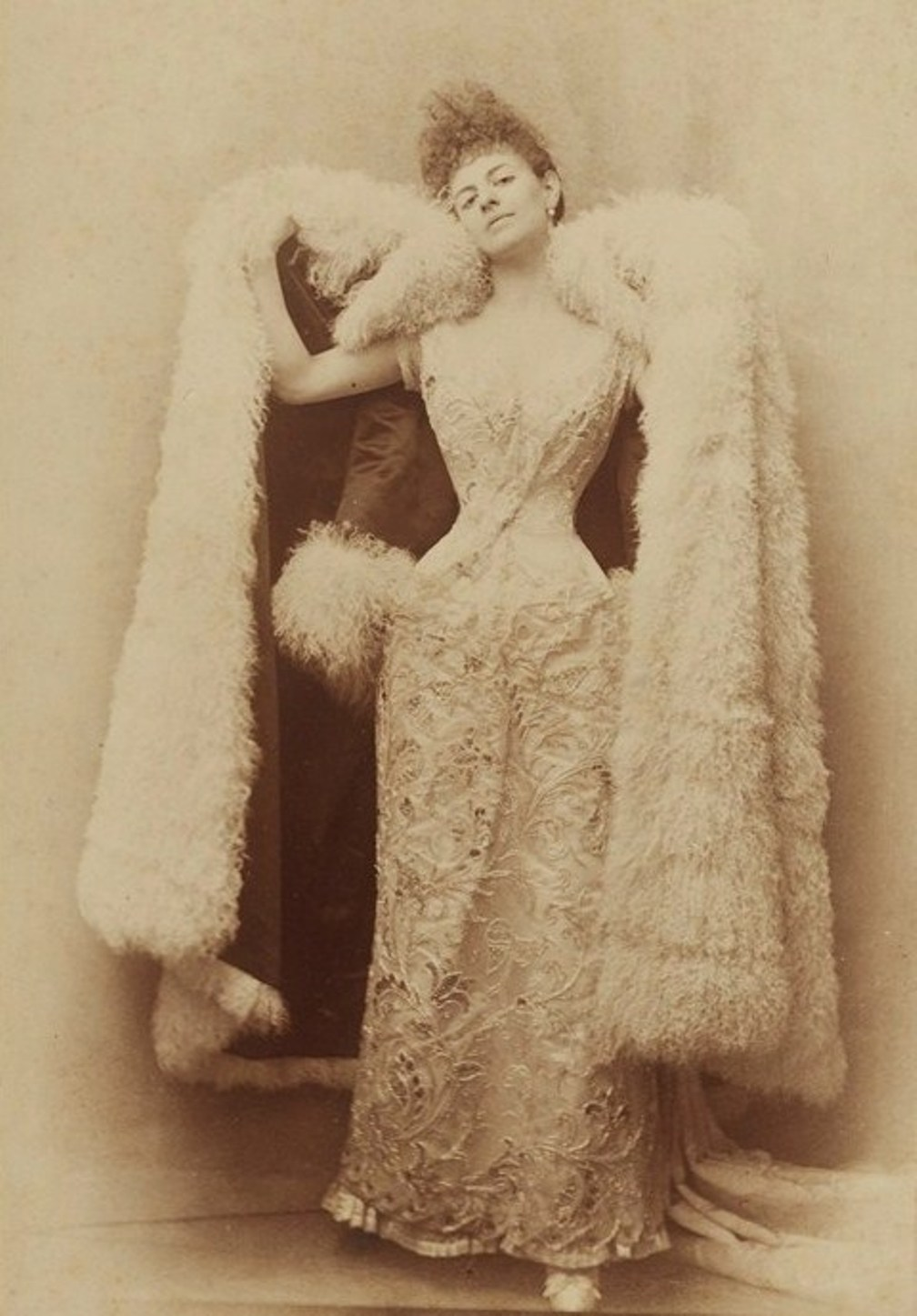
Élisabeth de Caraman-Chimay, countess Greffulhe (1860-1952). Photograph by Otto Wegener, circa 1887.

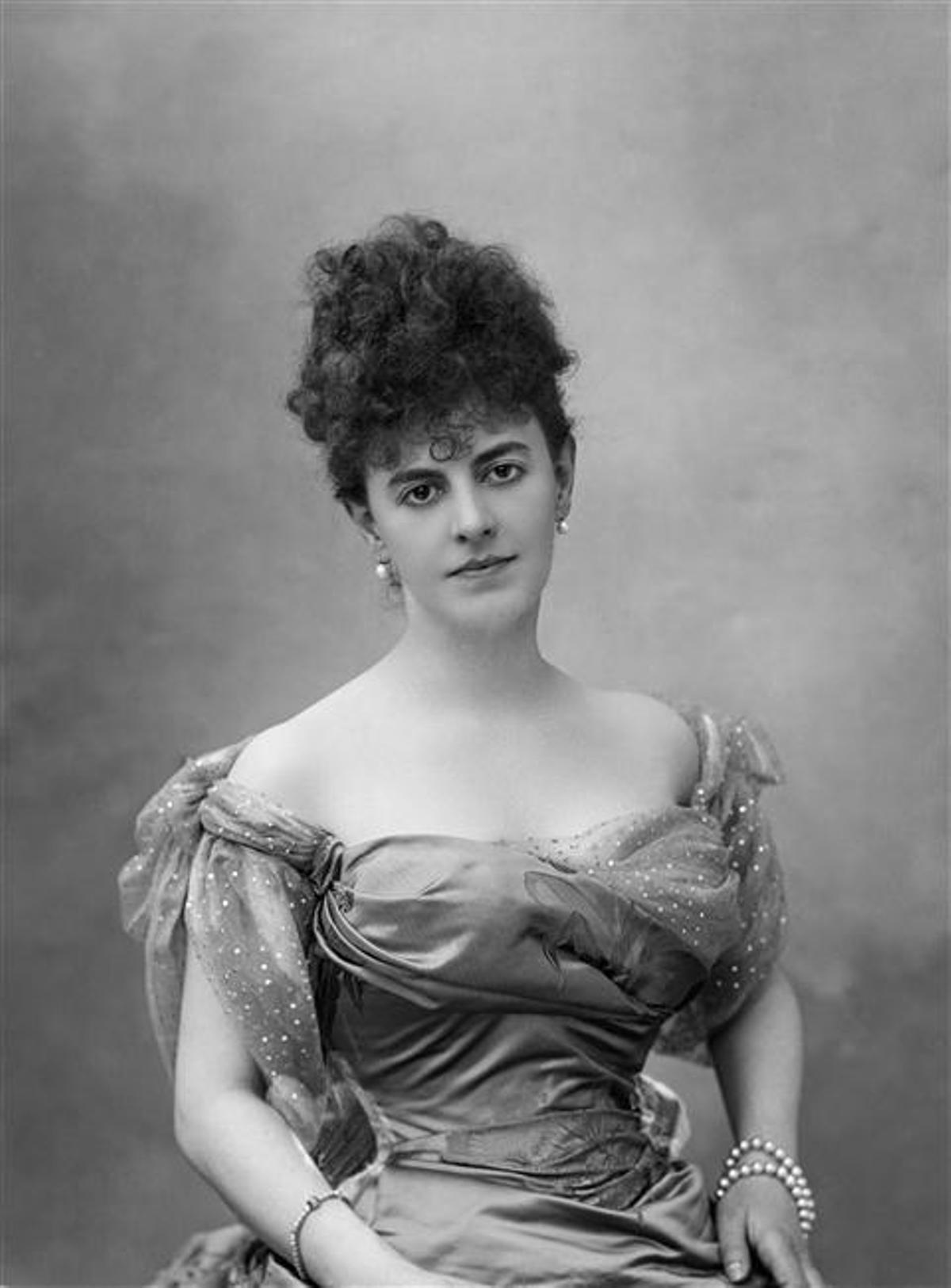
Élisabeth de Caraman-Chimay, Countess Greffulhe (1860-1952). Photograph by Paul Nadar in 1895.

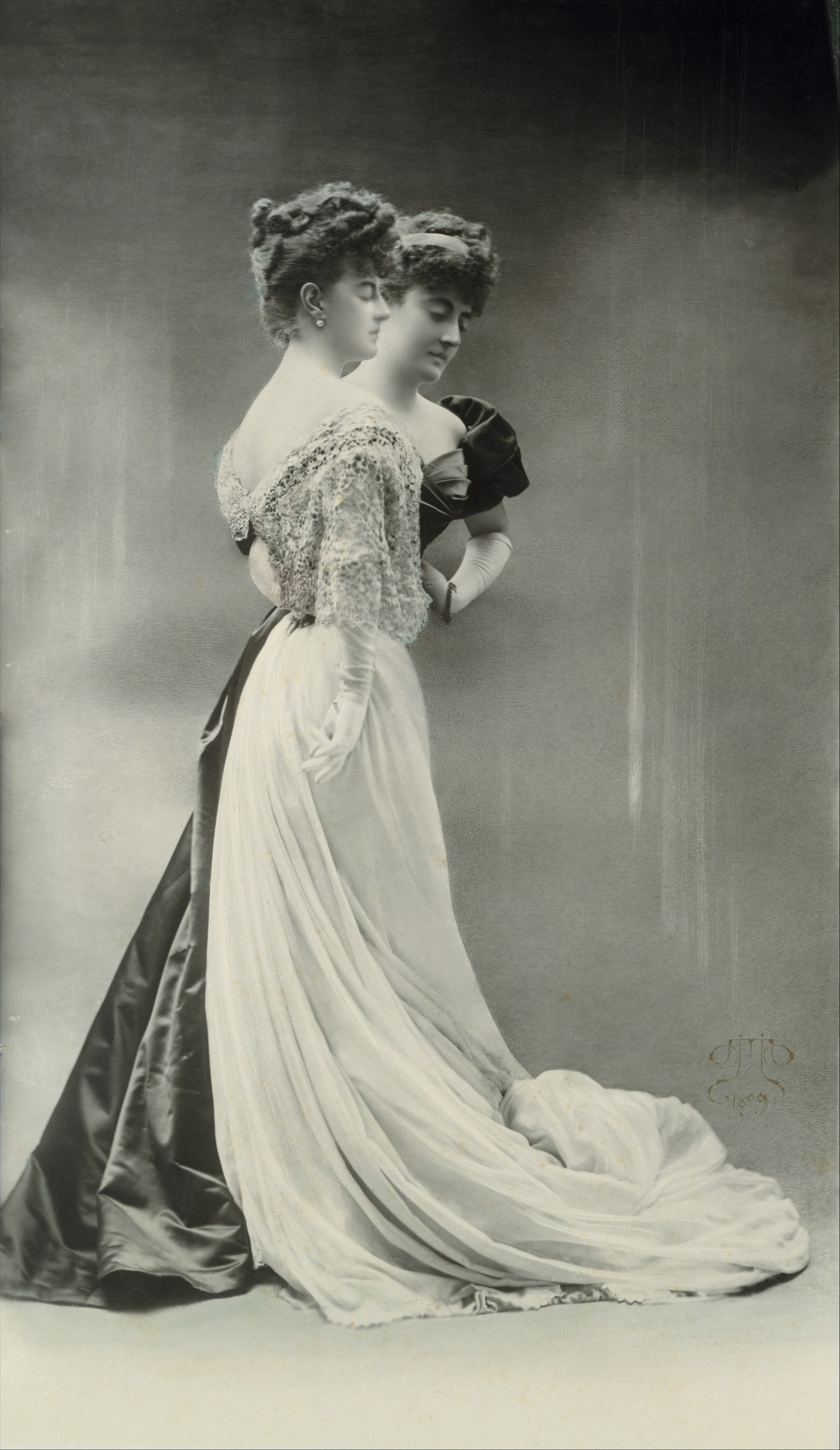
Élisabeth de Caraman-Chimay, Countess Greffulhe (1860-1952), double portrait photograph by Otto Wegener, 1899. Metropolitan Museum of Art, New York.

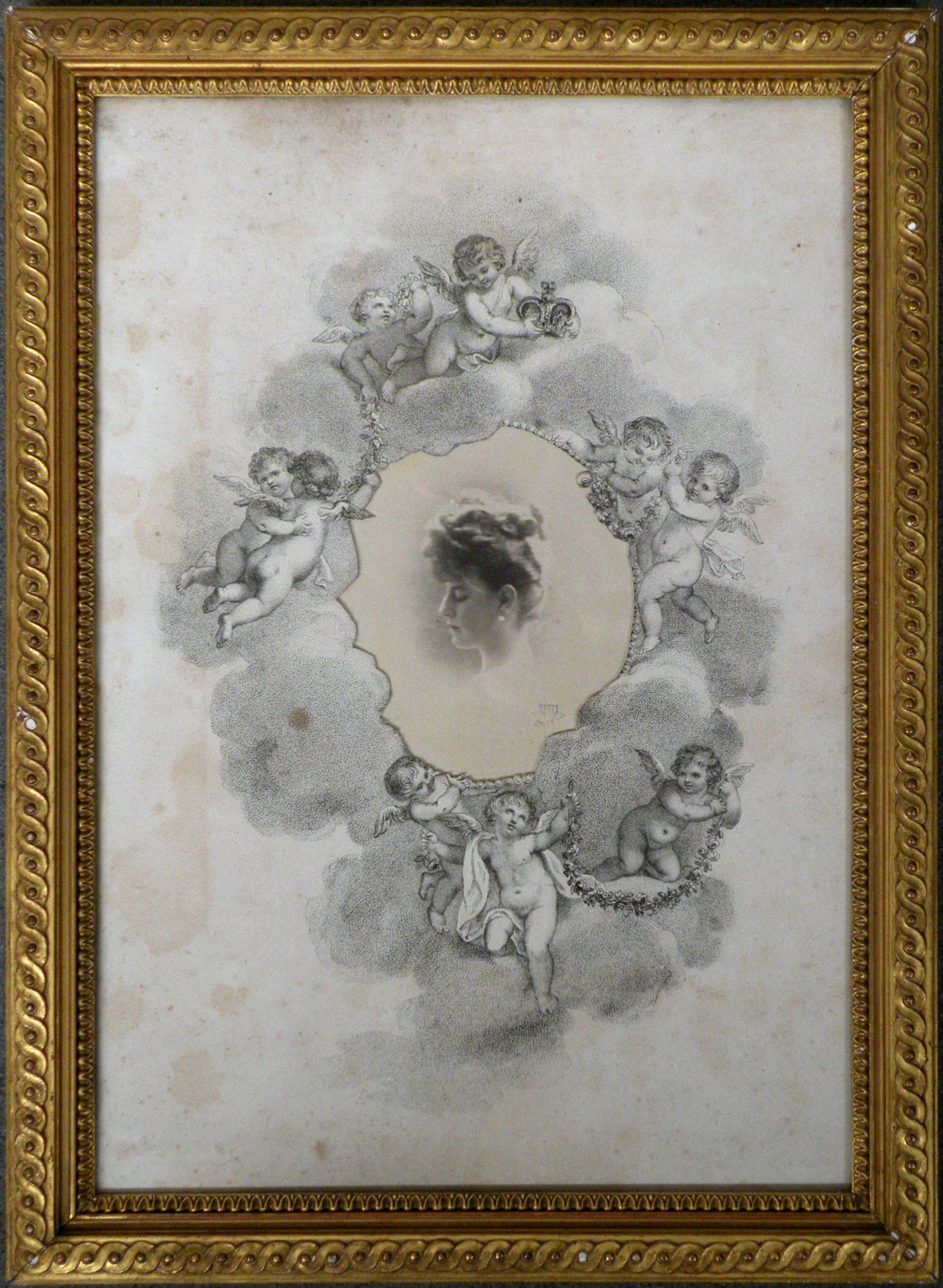
Élisabeth de Caraman-Chimay, Countess Greffulhe (1860-1952), portrait photograph by Otto Wegener, 1899.

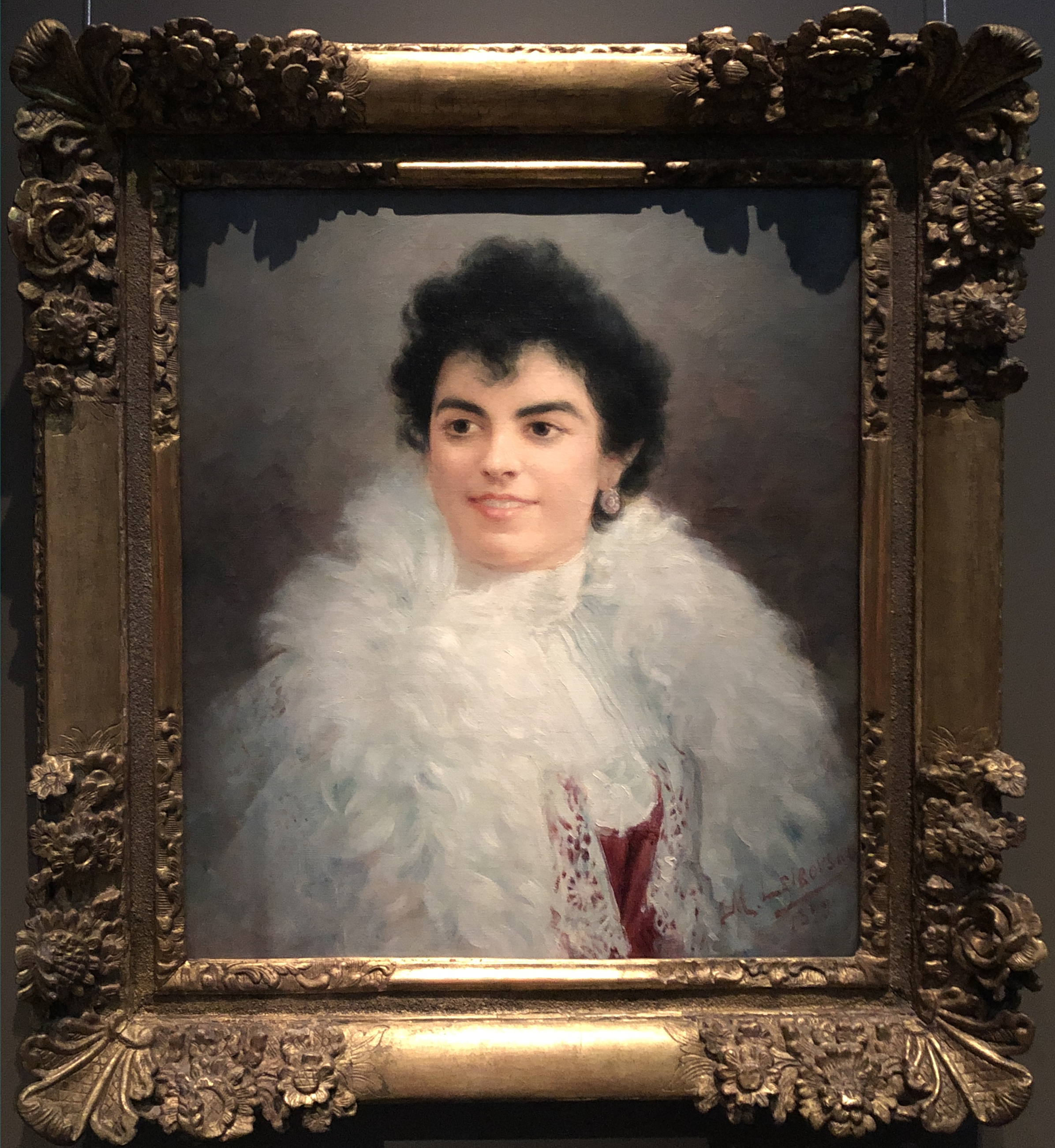
Self portrait countess Elisabeth Greffulhe (1899), Carnavalet museum, 2022.

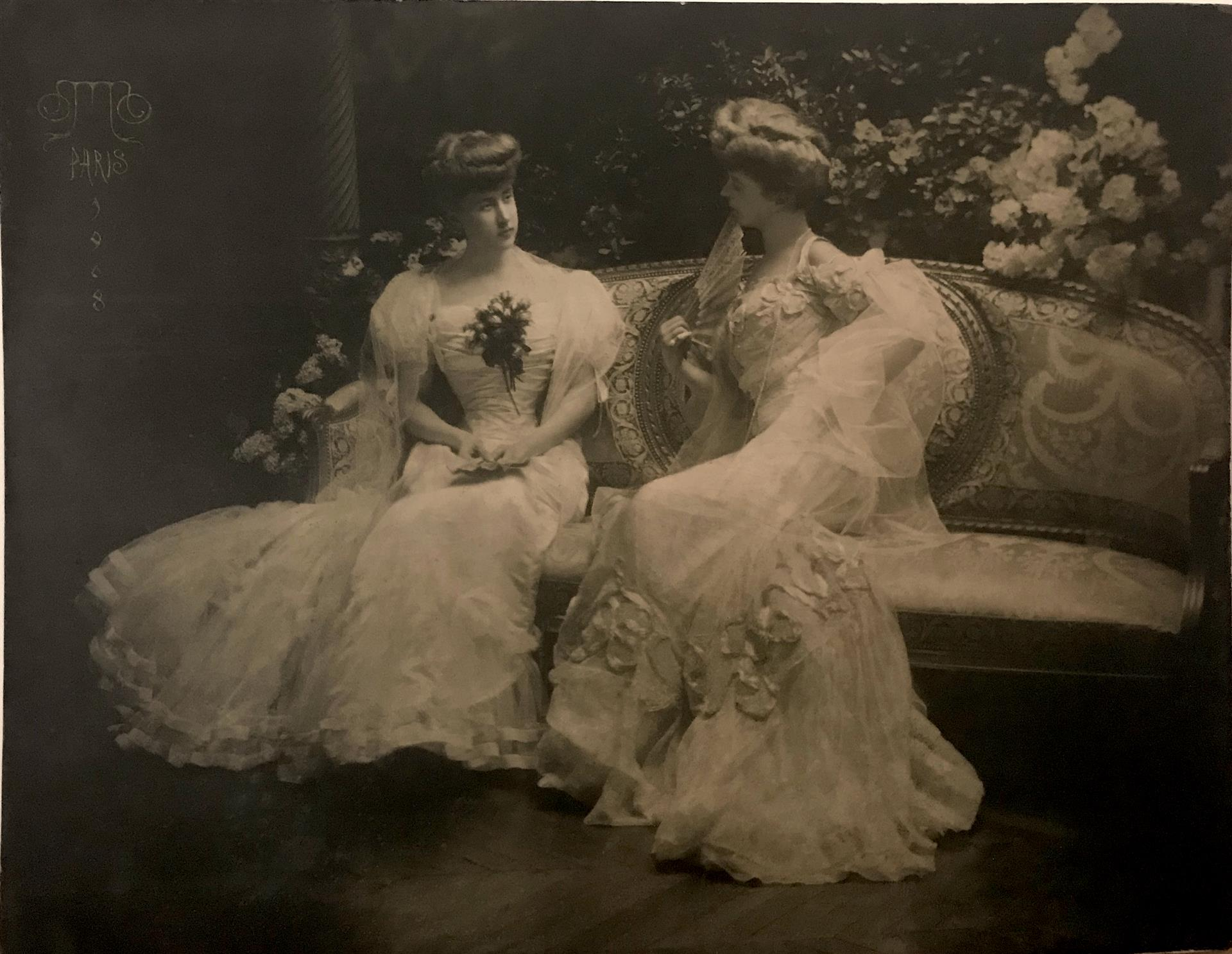
Élisabeth de Caraman-Chimay, Countess Greffulhe (1860-1952) and her daughter Elaine Greffulhe, photograph by Otto Wegener, 1908.

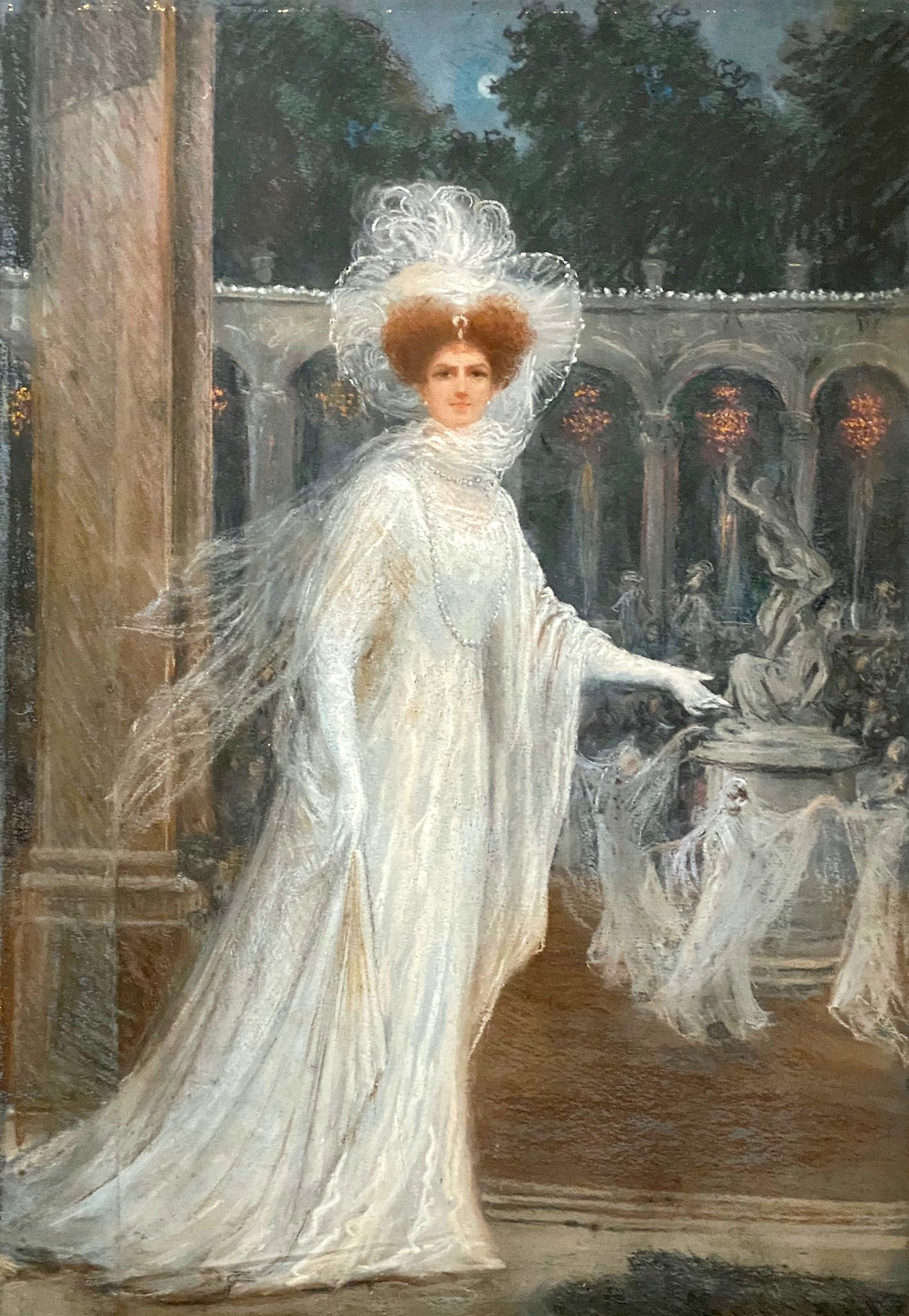
Countess Élisabeth Greffulhe in the Bosquet de la Colonnade in Versailles. Painting by Joseph-Raymond Fournier-Sarlovèze.

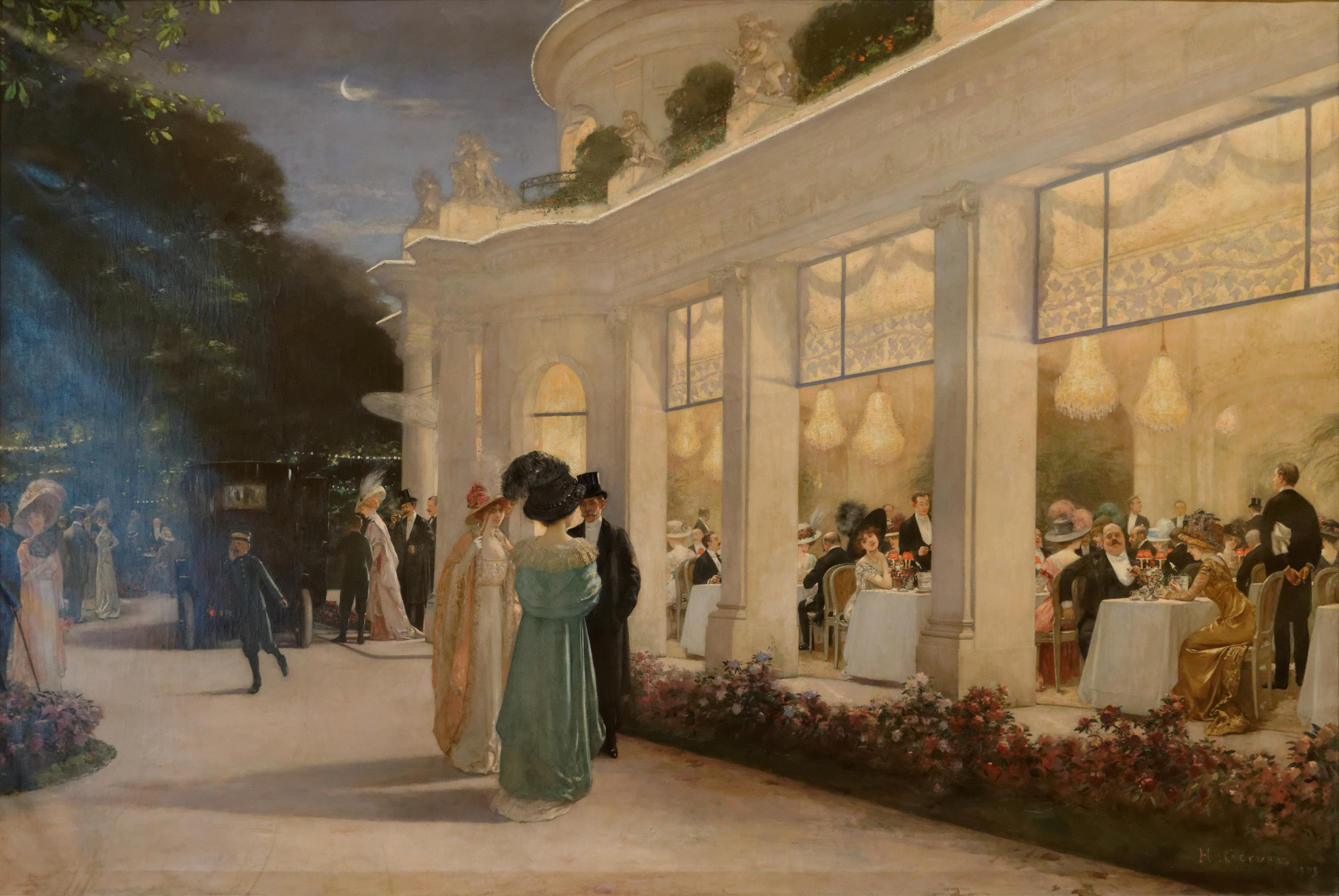
Henri Alexandre Gervex. An evening at Pré Catelan, 1909. Countess Greffulhe is seen ready to enter the car after her visit to the restaurant.

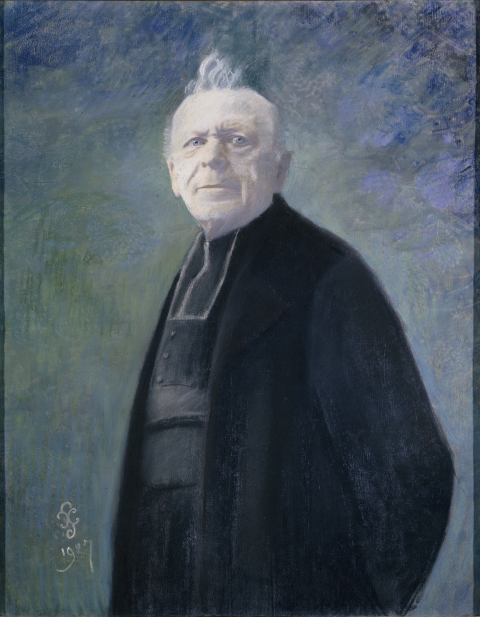
Portrait of l'abbé Mugnier. Painted by Élisabeth de Caraman-Chimay, Countess Greffulhe in 1921.

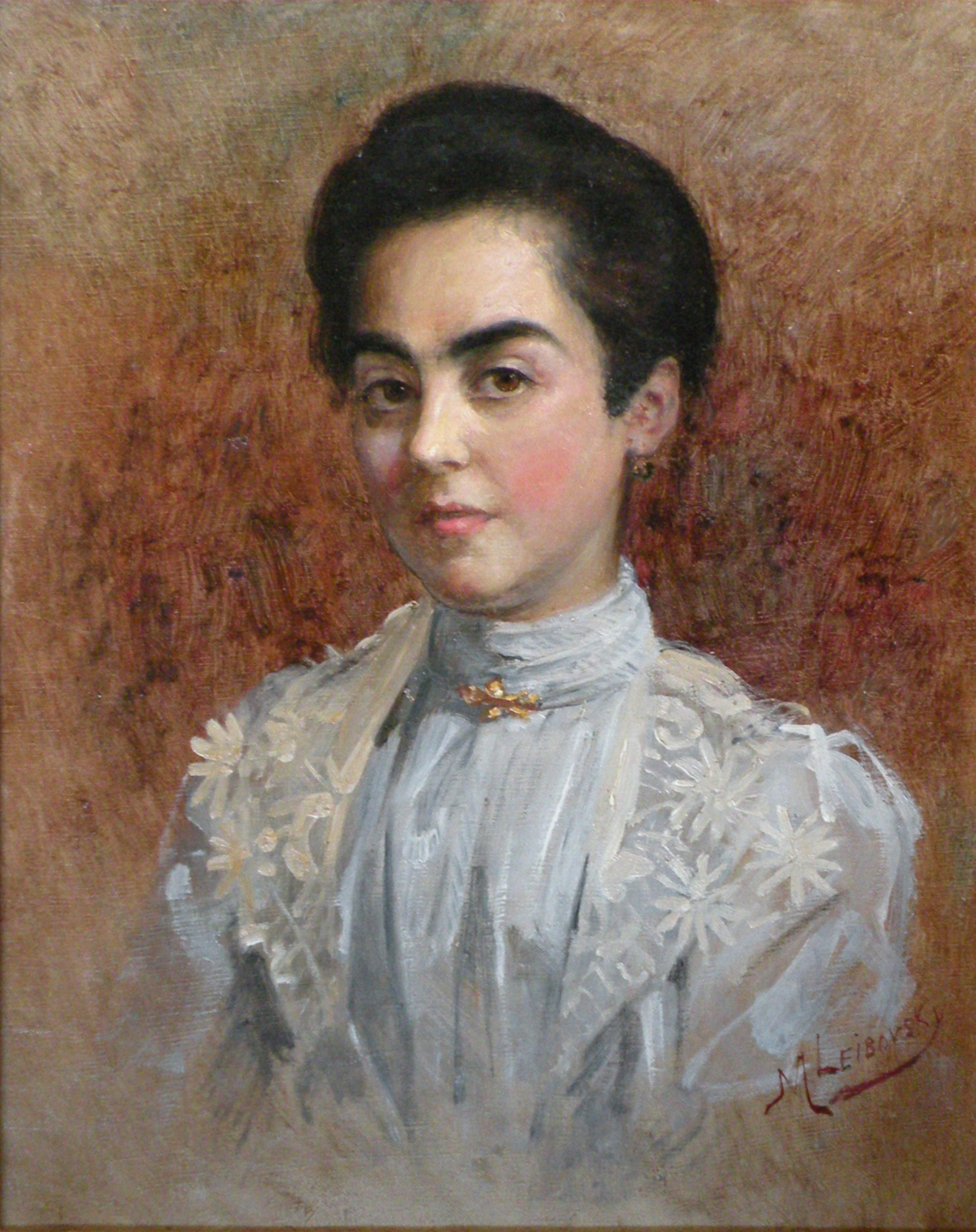
Portrait of elegant lady attributed to Comtesse Élisabeth Greffulhe, signed M. Leibovsky.

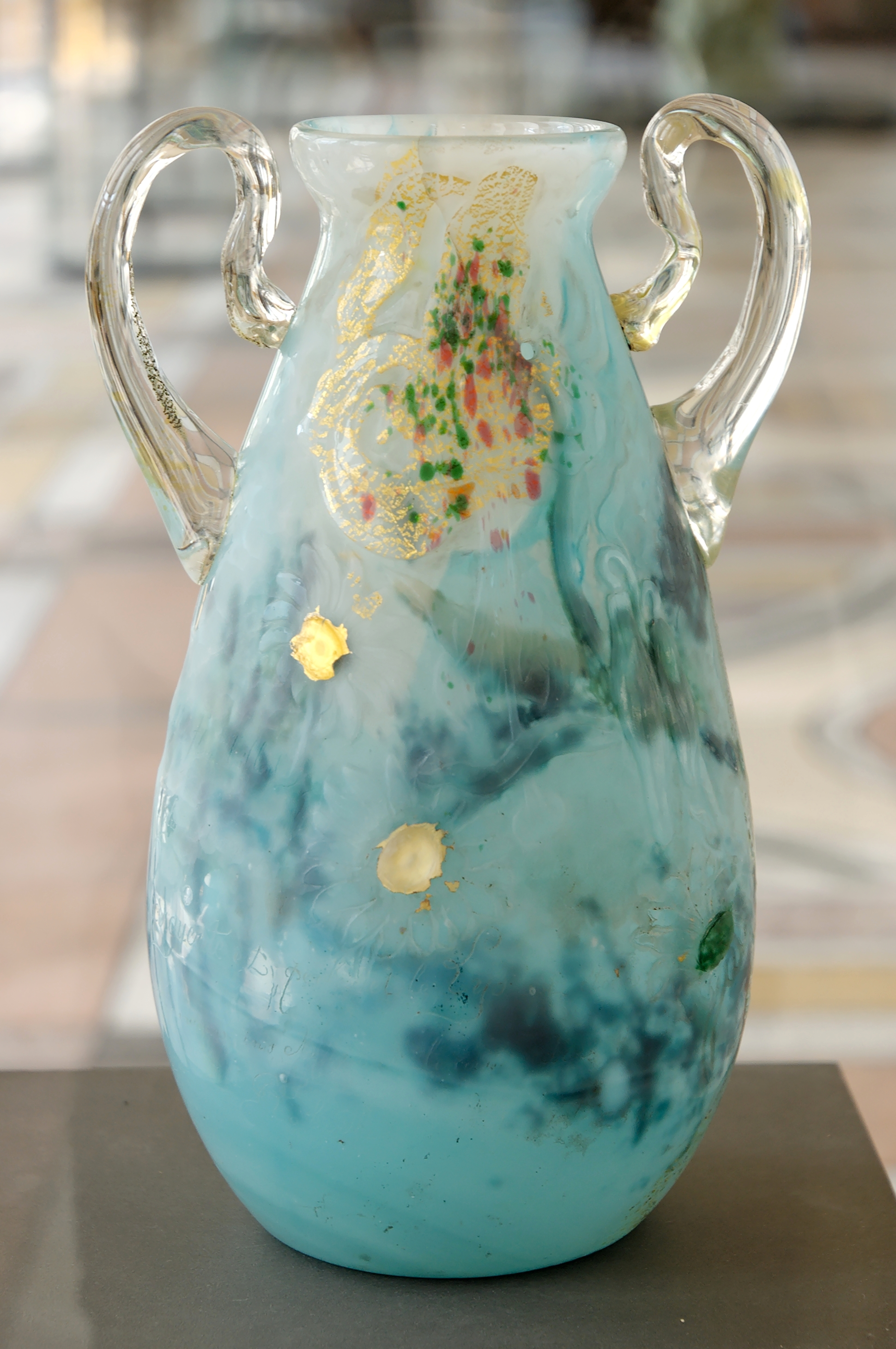
A vase commissioned by Élisabeth Greffulhe, inscribed with a quatrain by Robert de Montesquiou, her cousin.
