= Romain-Joseph de Brigode-Kemlandt =

Romain-Joseph de Brigode-Kemlandt (1775–1854) was a baron of the Empire, owner of Annappes.

He was appointed deputy of the Northern department Nord (French department), during 19 years between 1805 and 1837, and mayor of Annappes from 1814 to 1848. He expanded his castle and made an English park, the park of Brigode. In 1854, he founded, Gabrielle, old people's home in Annappes, today called villa Gabrielle.

== Family ==
He married Célestine Louise Henriette de Fay de La Tour-Maubourg, granddaughter of marquis de Lafayette, and daughter of Juste-Charles de Fay de La Tour-Maubourg. His Chateau passed thereafter, with the family de Montalembert (Jules de Montalembert, nephew of the writer, Charles de Montalembert, married the adopted daughter, of Romain de Brigode).
