= Romilly-la-Puthenaye =

- Commune
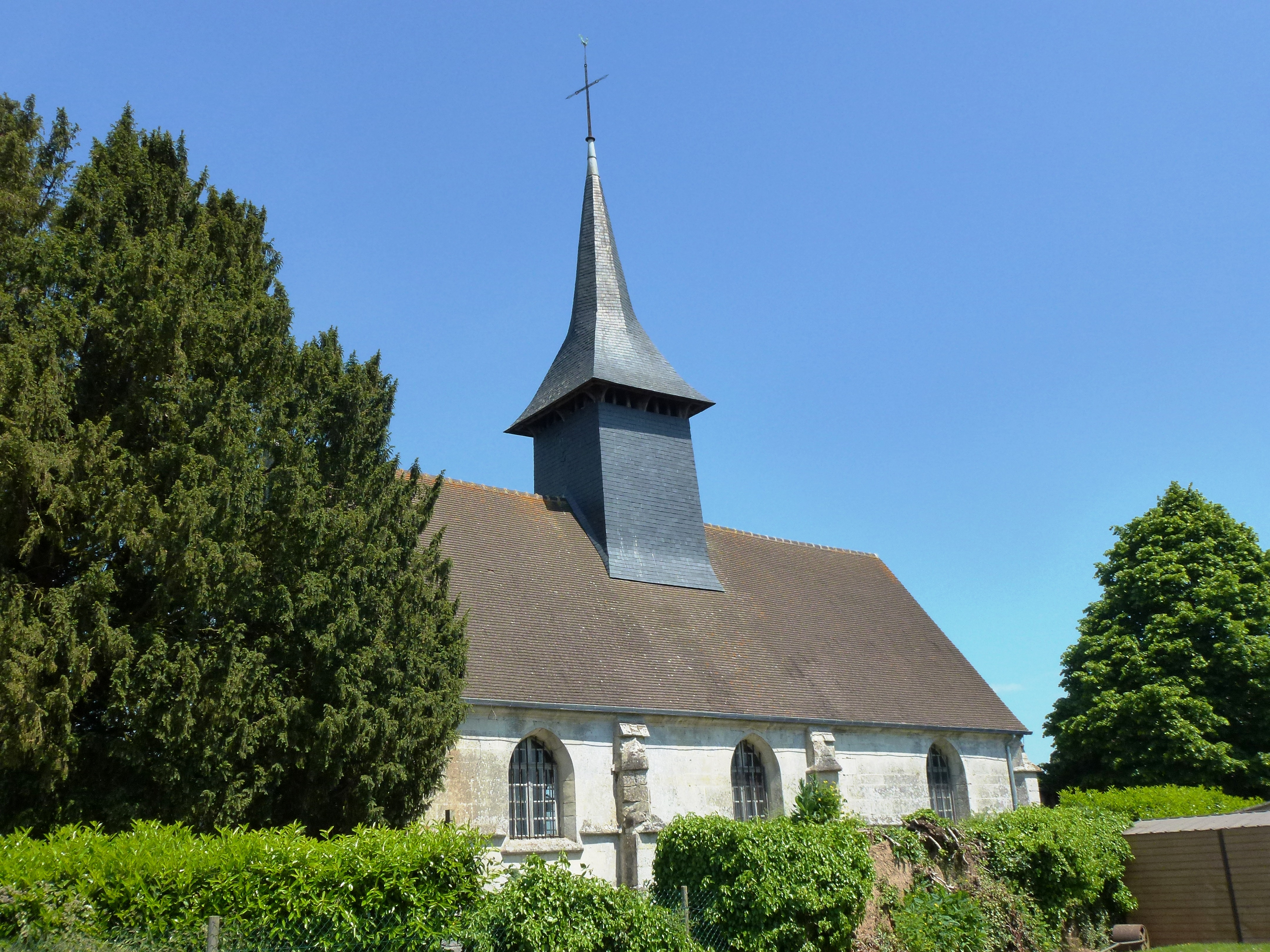
- The church in Romilly-la-Puthenaye

- Coat of arms
- Location of Romilly-la-Puthenaye
- Location within France Location within Normandy
- Coordinates: 49°00′11″N 0°50′54″E
- Country: France
- Region: Normandy
- Department: Eure
- Arrondissement: Bernay
- Canton: Brionne

Government
  - Mayor (2020–2026): Jean-Bernard Juin
- Area^{1}: 11.85 km^{2} (4.58 sq mi)
- Elevation: 158 m (518 ft)
- Highest elevation: 162 m (531 ft)
- Lowest elevation: 109 m (358 ft)
- Population (2023): 336
  - Density: 28.4/km^{2} (73.4/sq mi)
- Time zone: UTC+01:00 (CET)
  - Summer (DST): UTC+02:00 (CEST)
- INSEE/Postal code: 27492 /27170
- ^{1} French Land Register data, which excludes lakes, ponds, glaciers > 1 km^{2} (0.386 sq mi or 247 acres) and river estuaries.

Romilly-la-Puthenaye (French pronunciation: [ʁɔmiji la pytnɛ]) is a commune in the Eure department in northern France.

== Geography ==
The commune along with another 69 communes shares part of a 4,747 hectare, Natura 2000 conservation area, called Risle, Guiel, Charentonne.

== Population ==
Historical population
Year	Pop.	±% p.a.
1968	317	—
1975	315	−0.09%
1982	312	−0.14%
1990	310	−0.08%
1999	262	−1.85%
2007	296	+1.54%
2012	317	+1.38%
2017	318	+0.06%
2023	336	+0.92%
Source: INSEE

== See also ==
- Communes of the Eure department
