= Thérésa Tallien =

Spanish-born French noblewoman and socialite (1773–1835)

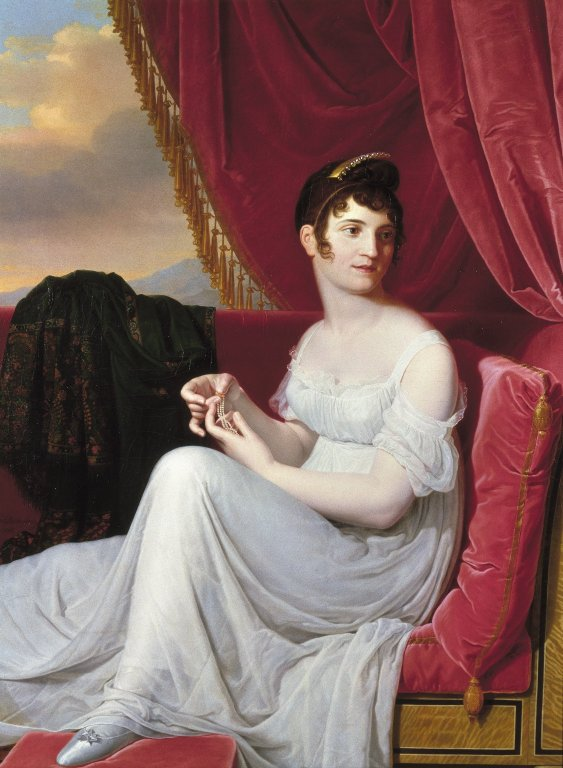
- Portrait of Madame Tallien, by Jean-Bernard Duvivier, 1806
- Born: Juana María Ignacia Teresa de Cabarrús y Galabert; 31 July 1773; Carabanchel Alto, Madrid, Spain
- Died: 15 January 1835 (aged 61); Chimay, Hainaut, Belgium
- Known for: Liaisons with high-profile men - and the role as symbol of the end of terror in France (Notre Dame du Thermidor)
- Spouse(s): 1 Marquis de Fontenay (annulled); 2 Jean-Lambert Tallien (annulled); 3 François-Joseph-Philippe de Riquet, Prince de Chimay
- Children: 11, by various husbands and lovers

Thérésa Cabarrus, Madame Tallien, later Princess of Chimay (31 July 1773 – 15 January 1835) was a Spanish-born French noblewoman and socialite, who is known as a fashion icon and a famous Salonnière during the Directory period Paris.

== Early life ==
She was born Juana María Ignacia Teresa de Cabarrús y Galabert in Carabanchel Alto, Madrid, Spain to François Cabarrus, an ethnic Basque French-born Spanish financier, and María Antonia Galabert, the daughter of a French industrialist based in Spain. Thérésa's father founded and governed the bank of San Carlos, which became the Royal Bank of Spain, and was King Joseph I of Spain's Minister of Finance. In 1789, he was ennobled by King Charles IV of Spain with the title of count.

From 1778 to 1783, Thérésa was raised by nuns in France. She was a student of the painter Jean-Baptiste Isabey. She returned home to the family castle briefly in 1785, and then her father sent her back to France at twelve years old to complete her education and get married.

The first of her many love affairs was with Alexandre de Laborde; however, the young couple was forced to separate as de Laborde's powerful father, Jean-Joseph de Laborde, disapproved of her. Cabarrus then arranged for his "very beautiful" daughter to marry a rich, powerful Frenchman in order to strengthen his position in France. On 21 February 1788 Thérésa was married to Jean Jacques Devin Fontenay (1762–1817), the last Marquis de Fontenay, a wealthy aristocrat described as small, red and ugly. The bride was fourteen years old. Even though in the 1780s Thérésa had begun to take an interest in Liberalism and the principles of the Revolution, she was presented at the court of King Louis XVI. The newlyweds visited the royal court of Spain as well. On 2 May 1789 Thérésa had a son, Devin Théodore de Fontenay (1789–1815), whose father was perhaps Felix le Peletier de Saint-Fargeau, brother of Louis-Michel le Peletier de Saint-Fargeau.

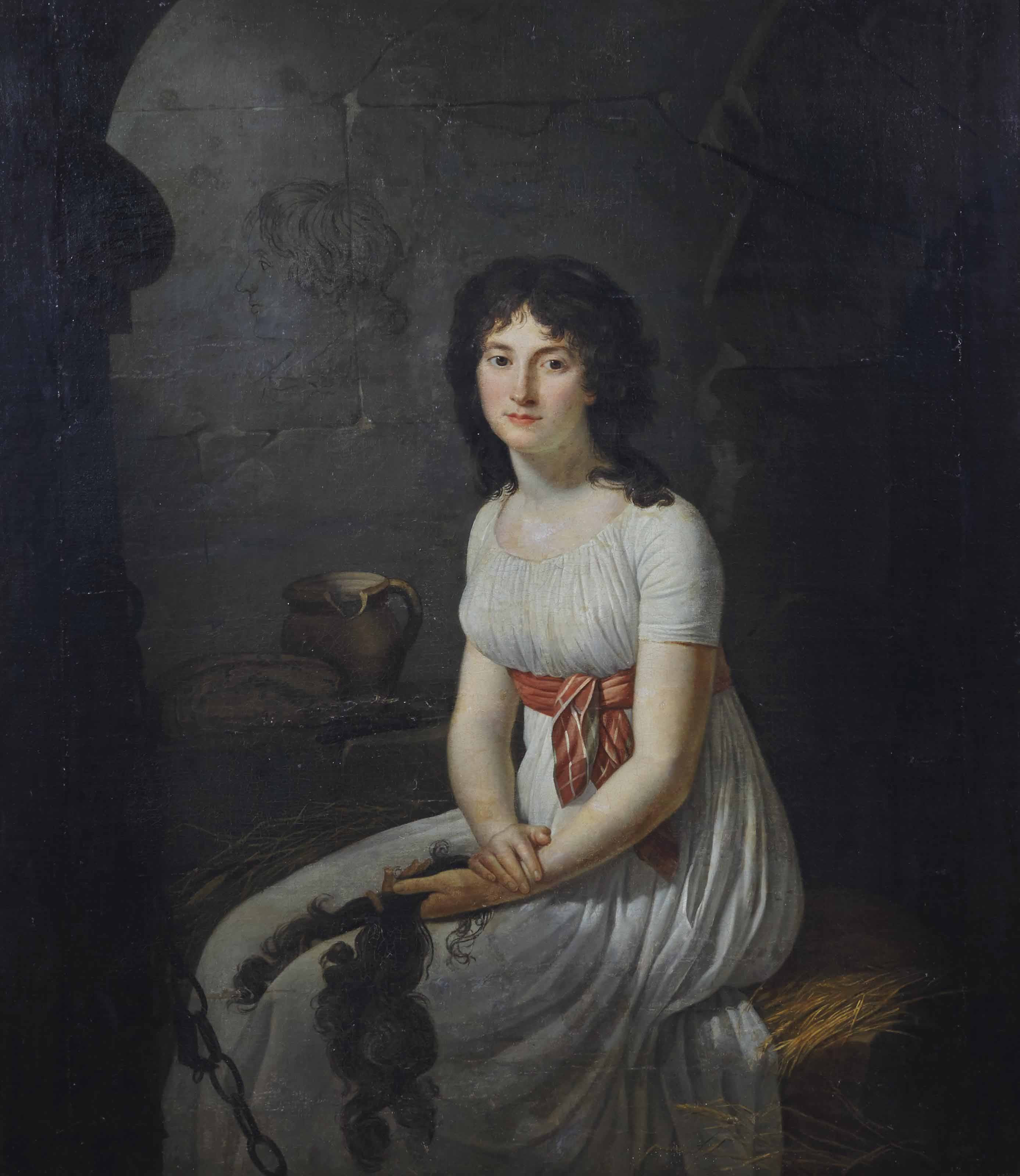
Citizen Tallien in a cell in La Force Prison, by Jean-Louis Laneuville, 1796. Her hair has been cut short and she is holding her locks in her hands.

When her husband fled at the outbreak of the Revolution in 1789, she resumed her maiden name and obtained a divorce in 1791. She took refuge in Bordeaux, where she was supported by her uncle and his family. While in Bordeaux she met Jean Lambert Tallien, Commissioner of the National Convention at the theatre. Some time later she began an affair with him. In December 1793 she appeared as the Goddess of Reason at a large parade organised in Bordeaux by Tallien and his fellow-Commissioner Ysabeau to celebrate the feast of Reason.

== Thermidor and Directory ==
In February 1794, Tallien was denounced by Maximilien Robespierre for moderation and the easing of repression. Robespierre also reproached him for his liaison with 'one Cabarrus, an ex-noble, who gets him to pardon many enemies of the Republic' She accompanied Tallien when he went to Paris to justify his conduct, only to be imprisoned on Robespierre's orders first in La Force prison, then in Carmes prison where she met Joséphine de Beauharnais. Tallien was one of the chief organisers of the Thermidorian Reaction which overthrew Robespierre. On the same day, 27 July 1794 (9 Thermidor) Tallien had Theresa and Joséphine de Beauharnais freed from prison and became one of the leading figures in French political life. Thérésa was a moderating influence on her husband: after the outbreak of the Thermidorian Reaction, she earned the moniker 'Our Lady of Thermidor' (French: Notre-Dame de Thermidor) as the person who was most likely to intervene in favor of the detained.

Pregnant with their daughter, she married Tallien on 26 December 1794. Their marriage was relatively short-lived however as Theresa began divorce proceedings against Tallien in February 1797. Tallien accompanied Napoleon to Egypt but was captured by the British on his voyage back to France and held prisoner. On his release in 1802, the divorce was finalised.

Thérésa became one of the leaders of Parisian social life. Her salon was famous and she was one of the originators of the Greek Revival Directoire style women's fashions of the French Directory period. She was a very colorful figure; one story is that she was said to bathe in the juice of strawberries for their healing properties. She once arrived at the Tuileries Palace, then the chief residence of Napoleon Bonaparte, supported by a black page, with eight sapphire rings and six toe rings, a gold bracelet on each ankle and nine bracelets on each arm. To top the look off Theresa had a head band covered in rubies. On another occasion she appeared at the Paris Opera wearing a white silk dress without sleeves and not wearing any underwear. Talleyrand commented: "Il n'est pas possible de s'exposer plus somptueusement!" ("One could not be more sumptuously unclothed!").

== Marriage to Riquet ==
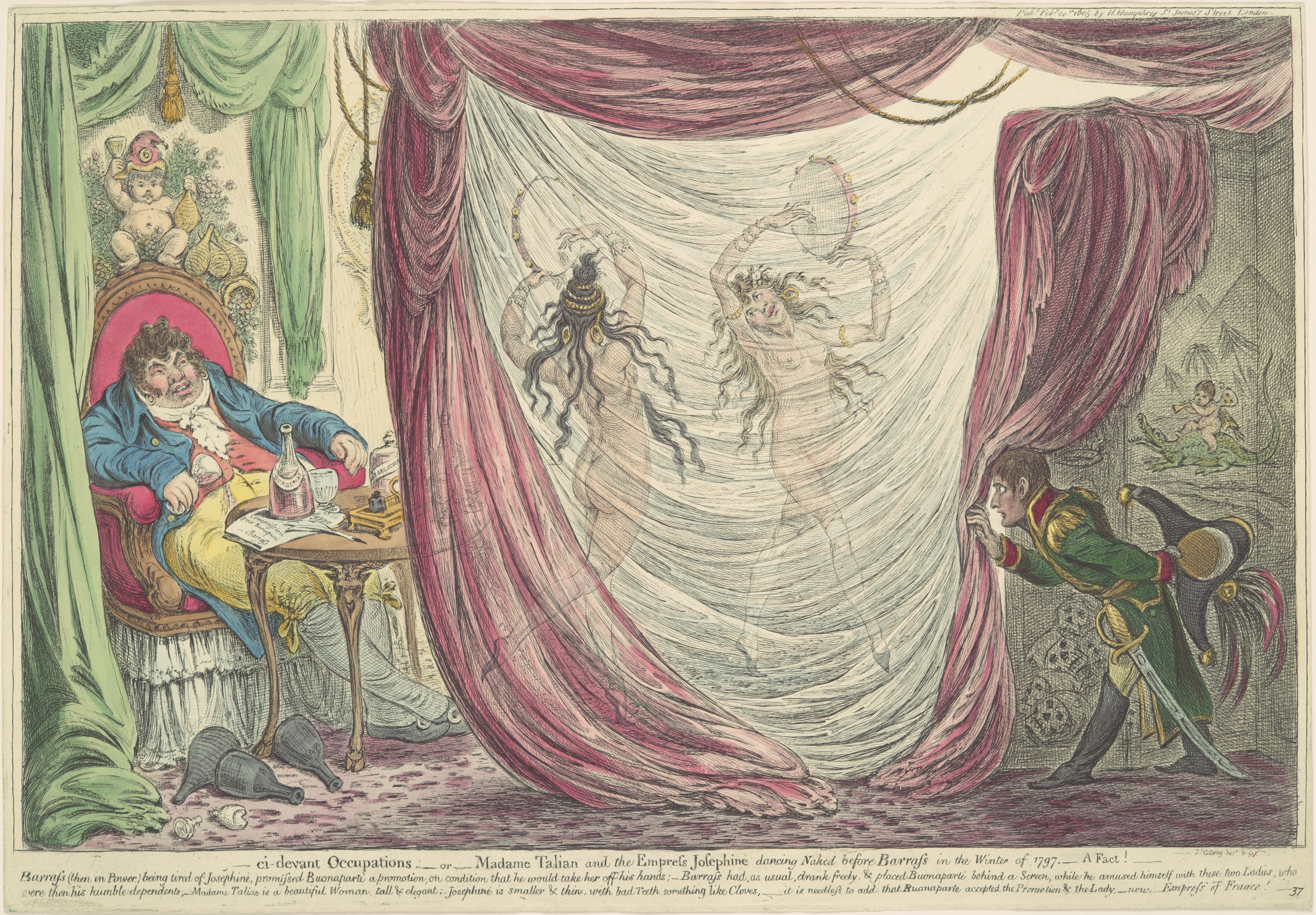
James Gillray's caricature of 1805. Paul Barras being entertained by the naked dancing of two wives of prominent men, Thérésa Tallien and Joséphine Bonaparte

After her divorce from Tallien Theresa had a brief flirtation with Napoleon. She then moved first to the powerful Paul Barras, whose former mistress was Napoleon's first wife Joséphine; then to the millionaire speculator Gabriel-Julien Ouvrard (with whom she had five children); and finally, attempting to regain respectability and to get away from Paris, she married François-Joseph-Philippe de Riquet, Comte de Caraman, on 22 August 1805 - he had become the sixteenth Prince of Chimay after the death of his childless uncle in 1804. She spent the rest of her life first in Paris, then on the Chimay estates (now in Belgium). After the Battle of Waterloo in 1815, these became part of the United Kingdom of the Netherlands.

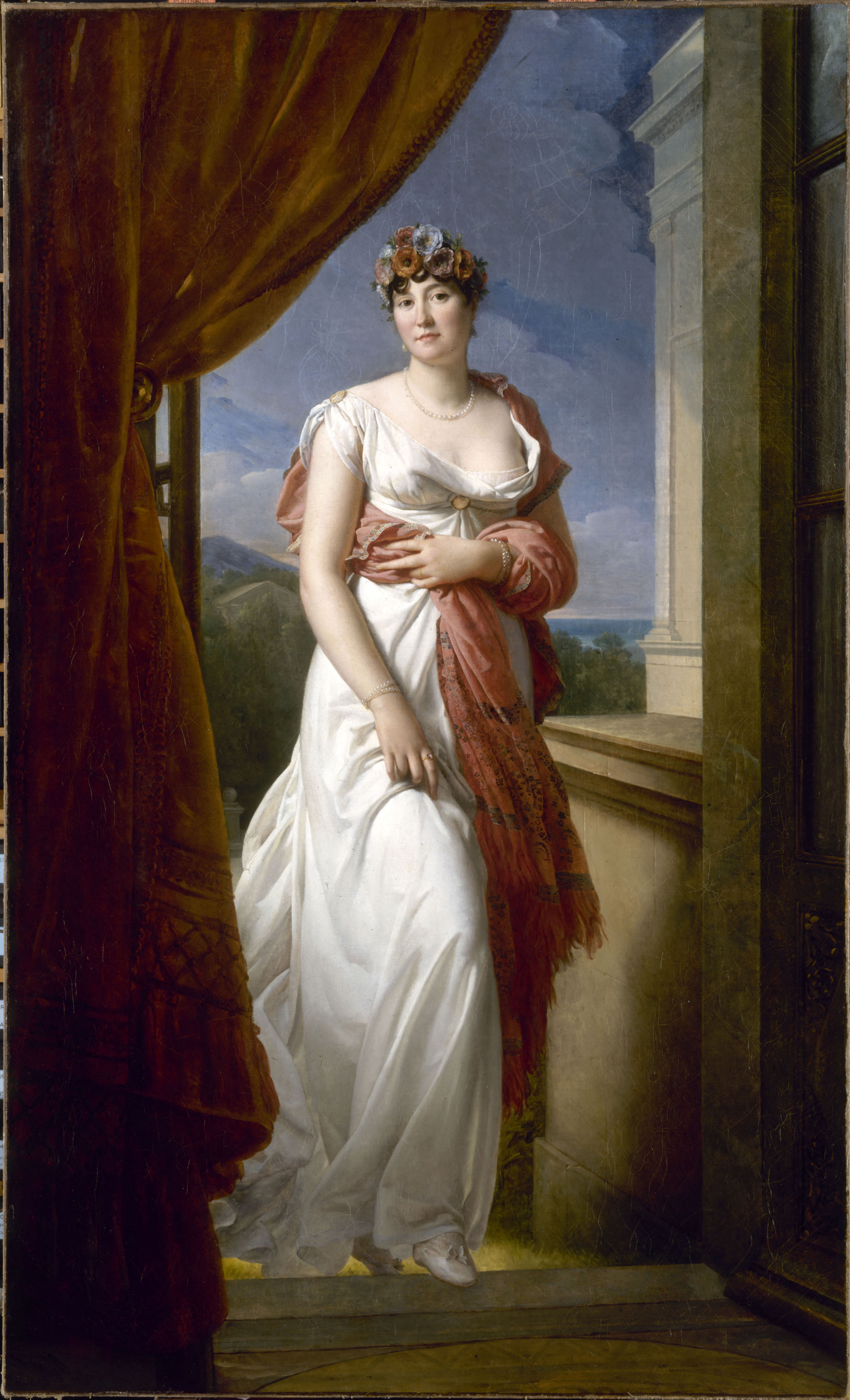
When Princesse de Chimay, by François Gérard, 1804

She had become one of the most famous women of her age, and she resented this role. Once when she appeared at the Louvre accompanied by her children, so many spectators flocked to see her up close, that she had to escape down a staircase to save herself. The marriage to Caraman meant that she returned to the class in which she had been born - and educated.

The couple invited musicians such as Daniel Auber, Rodolphe Kreutzer, Luigi Cherubini, Charles de Bériot and Maria Malibran to Paris and later to Chimay, where Thérésa held a little court. Cherubini composed his Messe en fa majeur dite Messe de Chimay at their castle there in 1809, derived from a Kyrie and Gloria he wrote in 1808 for the village church of Chimay.

Thérésa died in Chimay, where she was interred with François-Joseph de Riquet under the sacristy of the local church where a memorial stands to her memory. She bore eleven children during her various liaisons, including Joseph de Riquet, first son of François-Joseph-Philippe, who became the seventeenth Prince of Chimay in 1843.

== Children ==
Thérésa bore eleven children by various husbands and lovers.

Issue by a man via an affair named Ferdinand Louis Félix Lepeletier.

- Antoine François Julien Théodore Denis Ignace de Fontenay (Lepeletier) (1789–1815); had illegitimate issue.

Issue by Jean Lambert Tallien:

- Rose Thermidor Laure Josephine Tallien (1795–1862), married Count Felix de Narbonne-Pelet in 1815;

Issue by Paul Barras:

- Francis Barras, born in 1797, who died at 1833; had illegitimate issue.

Ouvrard was the father of five of her children, born during her marriage to Tallien and after her divorce:

- Clemence Isaure Thérésa Ouvrard (1800–1884), married Colonel Hyacinthe Devaux, no issue; as a widow she became a nun;
- Jules Adolphe Edouard Ouvrard de Cabarrus, Doctor Cabarrus (1801-1870), married Adélaïde de Lesseps (1803-1879);
- Clarisse Thérésa Ouvrard (1802-1877), married Achille Ferdinand Brunetiere in 1826; had illegitimate issue.
- Auguste Stéphanie Coralie Thérésa Ouvrard (1803-?), married Amédée Ferdinand Moissan de Vaux, son of the Baron of Vaux, in 1822.
- Elisabeth Gabrielle Ouvrard (1804-1857)

She and Riquet had three children together:

- Joseph Philippe de Riquet (1808–1886), 17th Prince de Chimay, Prince de Caraman; married Émilie Pellapra; had issue
- Michel Gabriel Alphonse Ferdinand de Riquet (1810–1865), father of Marie-Clotilde-Elisabeth Louise de Riquet, comtesse de Mercy-Argenteau;
- Marie Auguste Louise Thérèse Valentine de Riquet (1815–1876), married Georges, Marquis du Hallay-Coétquen, had three daughters.

== Cultural references ==
As Teresa Cabarrús, she is a prominent character in Baroness Orczy's novel The Triumph of the Scarlet Pimpernel.

She was played by Carolyn Jones in the 1954 film Désirée, starring Marlon Brando, and by Florence Pernel in the 2002 Napoléon (miniseries).
