= Françoise-Marie LeRoy =

Françoise-Marie LeRoy was the mother of Émilie Louise Marie Françoise Joséphine Pellapra. Émilie may have been an illegitimate daughter of Napoleon I.

LeRoy was daughter of a Lyon bookseller. Her husband was Henri (de) Pellapra, a rich financer.

Émilie Pellapra claimed she was the natural daughter of Napoleon. This would have had to have been the result of an affair with her mother at the time of a stay by Napoleon in Lyon. This claim was that an affair took place in April 1805, whilst Napoleon was on the way to Italy to be crowned. But this date is incompatible with the birth of Émilie in November 1806. For Émilie to have been the daughter of Napoleon, it would have been necessary that he stayed in Lyon in February 1806. However, no stay in this city at that time seems to have taken place and, according to several authors (in particular André Gavoty in the Bulletin de l'Institut Napoleon April 1950), Napoleon only met LeRoy in 1810.
