= List of Christian monasteries in Belgium =

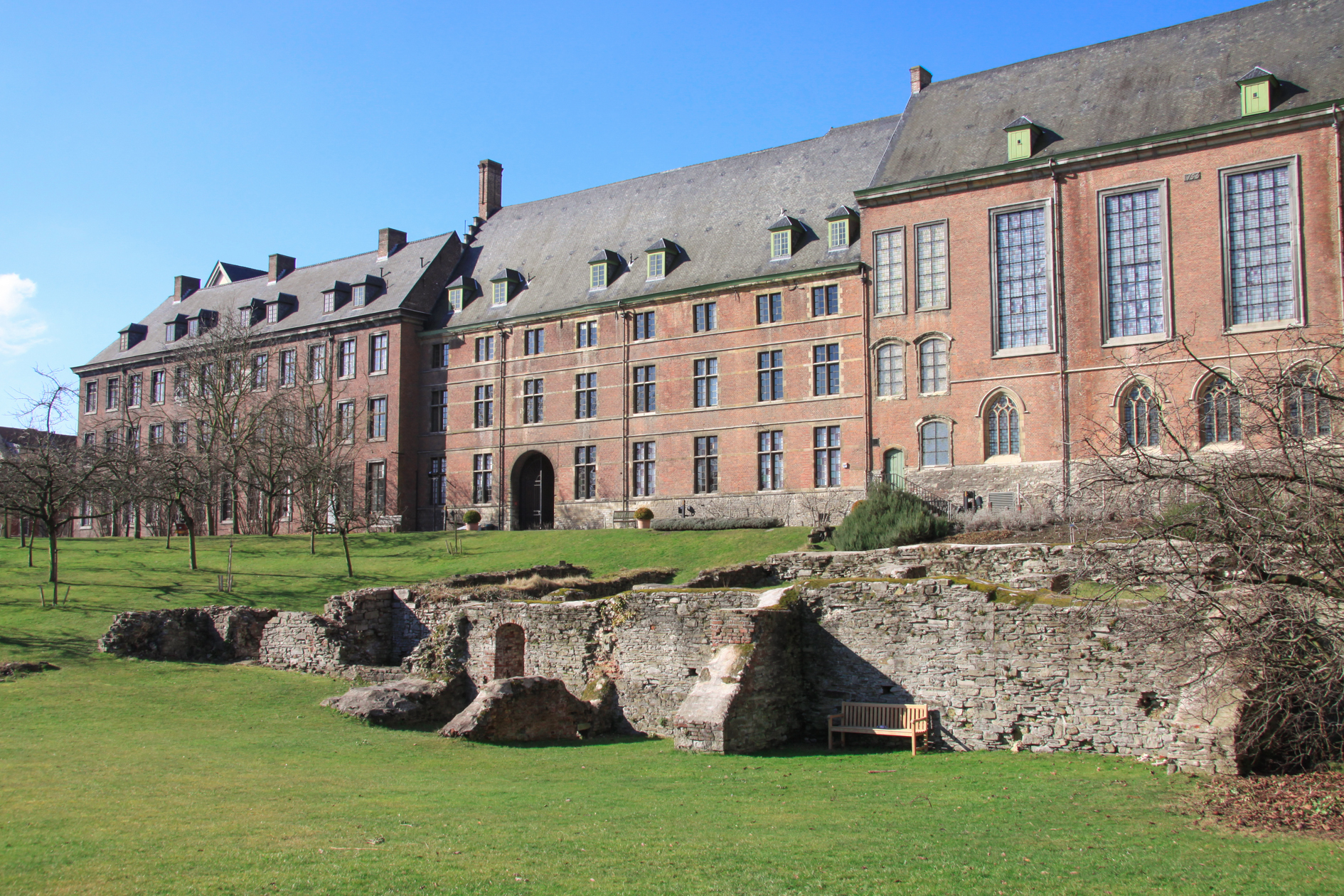
Former St. Peter's Abbey, Ghent

This is a list, as yet incomplete, of Christian religious houses, both extant and dissolved, in Belgium, for both men and women. All listed so far are Roman Catholic.

== A ==
- Achel Abbey (Sint-Benedictusabdij van Achel, de Achelse Kluis or Onze-Lieve-Vrouw-van-La-Trappe-van-de-Heilige-Benedictus) (extant), part in Hamont-Achel, Limburg, Belgium, and part in Valkenswaard, the Netherlands: Trappist monks
- Affligem (Flemish Brabant):
  - Affligem Abbey (Abdij van Affligem) (extant) at Hekelgem: Benedictine monks
  - Saints Mary and Wivina's Abbey, Affligem (dissolved) (Abdij Maria Mediatrix en Sant Wivina): Benedictine nuns
- Aldeneik Abbey (Abdij van Aldeneik) at Aldeneik, Maaseik, Limburg: Benedictine nuns, later canons regular
- Amay, former commune of Jehay (Liège Province):
  - Amay Abbey (Abbaye de la Paix-Dieu d'Amay) (dissolved): Cistercian nuns (1244–1797)
  - Amay Priory (Prieuré d'Amay), founded in the former premises of Amay Abbey above, and later moved to form Chevetogne Abbey: Benedictine monks. The premises now accommodate the Centre de perfectionnement aux métiers du patrimoine and the Maison du tourisme Hesbaye et Meuse
- Andenne Abbey (Abbaye d'Andenne) at Andenne (Namur): Benedictine double abbey, later secular canonesses
- Antwerp:
  - Antwerp Charterhouse: Carthusians
  - St. Michael's Abbey, Antwerp: Premonstratensians
  - St. Saviour's Abbey, Antwerp (Abdij SintSalvator Antwerpen): Cistercian monks
- Argenton Abbey (Abbaye d'Argenton) at Lonzée, Gembloux (Namur Province): Cistercian nuns
- Assebroek, see Steenbrugge
- Ath Abbey (Abbaye Notre-Dame du Refuge d'Ath) at Ath (Hainaut Province): Cistercian nuns
- Aubechies Abbey (Abbaye de la Sainte-Trinité et de Saint-Géry d'Aubechies) at Aubechies (Hainaut): Benedictine monks
- Aulne Abbey (Abbaye d'Aulne) at Gozée (Hainaut): Benedictine monks, then secular clergy, then Augustinian canons, then Cistercian monks
- Averbode Abbey (Abdij van Averbode) (extant) at Averbode, Scherpenheuvel-Zichem (Flemish Brabant): Premonstratensians
- Aywiers Abbey or Aywières Abbey (Abbaye d'Aywiers or d'Aywières), founded at Awirs but moved to Couture-Saint-Germain, Lasne (Walloon Brabant): Cistercian nuns

== B ==
- Baudelo Abbey (Abdij van Baudelo or Baudeloo) at Klein-Sinaai (East Flanders): Cistercian nuns
- Beaupré Abbey (Abdij van Beaupré) at Grimminge (East Flanders): Cistercian nuns
- Beaurepart Abbey (Abbaye du Beaurepart) in Liège: Premonstratensians
- Ter Beeck Abbey (Abdij Ter Beeck) at Halle-Booienhoven, Zoutleeuw, Flemish Brabant: Cistercian nuns
- Béguinages (Begijnhoven) at:
  - Antwerp, Bruges, Dendermonde, Diest, Ghent (Old Saint Elisabeth, New Saint Elisabeth in Sint-Amandsberg and Our Lady Ter Hooyen) Hoogstraten, Lier, Leuven (Large and Small), Mechelen (Large and Small) Kortrijk, Sint-Truiden, Turnhout and Tongeren
- Bethlehem Abbey, Bonheiden (extant) at Bonheiden (Antwerp): Benedictine nuns
- Bijloke Abbey, also Byloque Abbey (Abdij van der Bijloke or Abbaye de la Byloque) at Ghent (East Flanders): Cistercian nuns
- Bois-Seigneur-Isaac Abbey (Abbaye de Bois-Seigneur-Isaac) at Ophain-Bois-Seigneur-Isaac, Braine-l'Alleud, Walloon Brabant: Maronite
- Boneffe Abbey (Abbaye de Boneffe) at Éghezée (Namur): Cistercian nuns, then Cistercian monks (from 1461)
- Bonheiden Abbey, see Bethlehem Abbey, Bonheiden
- Bonne-Espérance Abbey (Abbaye de Bonne-Espérance) at Vellereille-les-Brayeux, Estinnes (Hainaut): Premonstratensians
- Bornem, see St. Bernard's Abbey, Bornem
- Braschaat Abbey (Abdij SintMichiel Braschaat) at Braschaat (Antwerp): Premonstratensians
- Brecht Abbey or Abbey of Our Lady of Nazareth, Brecht (Abdij van Onze Vrouwe van Nazareth) (refoundation of the earlier house at Lier) at Brecht (Antwerp): Trappist nuns
- Brialmont Abbey (Abbaye Notre-Dame de Brialmont) (extant), in the former Château de Brialmont, Tilff (Liège): Trappist nuns
- Brogne Abbey (Abbaye de Saint-Gérard-de-Brogne) at Saint-Gérard (Namur): Benedictine monks (founded 919)
- Bruges (West Flanders):
  - Augustinian Priory, Bruges (Augustijnenklooster, Brugge): Augustinian canons
  - Eekhout Abbey (Eekhoutabdij, Sint-Bartholomeusabdij): Augustinian canons
  - St. Andrew's Abbey, Bruges (Abdij Sint-Andries Brugge), now St. Andrew's Abbey, Zevenkerken: Benedictine monks
  - St. Godelieve's Abbey, Bruges (St. Godelieveabdij, Brugge): Benedictine nuns
  - St. Trudo's Abbey, Bruges (Sint-Trudoabdij, Brugge), originally in Bruges, then Male, now back in Bruges: Canonesses Regular of the Holy Sepulchre
  - Ten Wijngaerde Béguinage (Begijnhof Ten Wijngaerde): Beguines; from 1927 a priory of Benedictine nuns, as the Monasterium De Wijngaard
- Brussels:
  - Coudenberg Abbey (Abbaye du Coudenberg, Abbaye Saint-Jacques-sur-Coudenberg; Abdij Sint-Jacob op de Koudenberg) in Brussels: Augustinian canons
  - English Ladies, Brussels (Abbaye des Dames anglaises de Bruxelles): English Benedictine nuns in exile
  - Jericho Priory (Klooster Jericho, Klooster Onze Lieve Vrouw ter Rosen gheplant in Jericho) in Brussels: Canonesses Regular

== C ==
- La Cambre Abbey (Abbaye de la Cambre or Abdij Ter Kameren) at Ixelles, Brussels: Cistercian nuns
- Cambron Abbey (Abbaye de Cambron-Casteau) at Brugelette (Hainaut): Cistercian monks
- Celles Abbey (Abbaye Saint-Hadelin de Celles-sur-Lesse) at Celles, Houyet (Namur): either Benedictine monks, or a men's collegiate foundation
- Chercq Charterhouse (Chartreuse de Chercq) (dissolved) at Chercq near Tournai (Hainaut): Carthusians
- Chevetogne Abbey (Abbaye de Chevetogne) at Ciney (Namur): Benedictine monks of both Latin and Byzantine rites
- Chimay (Hainaut):
  - St. Monegonde's Abbey, Chimay (Abbaye Sainte-Monégonde de Chimay) (dissolved): Benedictine monks
  - Sts. Peter and Paul's Abbey, Chimay: men's collegiate foundation
  - Our Lady of Peace Abbey, Chimay (Abbaye Notre-Dame de la Paix de Chimay): Cistercian nuns, from 1919
  - see also Scourmont Abbey
- Clairefontaine Abbey (Abbaye de Clairefontaine) near Arlon (Luxembourg): Trappist nuns
- Cortenberg, see Kortenberg
- Coudenberg Abbey, see Brussels

== D ==
- Dendermonde Abbey or Saints Peter and Paul's Abbey, Dendermonde (Sint Pieters-en-Paulusabdij, Dendermonde) at Dendermonde (East Flanders): Benedictine monks
- Dieleghem Abbey (Abbaye de Dieleghem) at Dielegem in Jette (Brussels): Augustinian Canons 1095–1140, thereafter Premonstratensians
- Diest, see Zelem
- Dikkelvenne Abbey (Abdij van Dikkelvenne), moved to Geraardsbergen in 1081, at Dikkelvenne, Gavere (East Flanders): Benedictine monks
- Ter Doest Abbey (Abdij Ter Doest) at Lissewege, Bruges (West Flanders): Cistercian monks
- Doornzele Abbey (Abdij van Doornzele) at Evergem (East Flanders): Cistercian nuns
- Drongen Abbey (Abdij van Drongen) at Drongen, Gent (East Flanders): Premonstratensians
- Ten Duinen Abbey (Abdij Onze-Lieve-Vrouw Ten Duinen or Abdij Ten Duinen; Abbaye des Dunes) at Koksijde (West Flanders): Cistercian monks

== E ==
- Eekhout Abbey, see Bruges
- Ename Abbey (Sint-Salvatorabdij) at Ename, Oudenaarde (East Flanders): Benedictine monks
- Enghien Charterhouse (Chartreuse d'Enghien) at Enghien (Hainaut): Carthusian monks
- Épinlieu Abbey (Abbaye d'Épinlieu) at Mons (Hainaut): Cistercian nuns
- Ermeton Abbey (Abbaye Notre-Dame d'Ermeton-sur-Biert) at Ermeton-sur-Biert (Namur): Benedictine nuns There are ruins nearby of an earlier monastery, of which nothing is known
- Eversam Abbey (Abdij van Eversam) at Stavele (West Flanders): Augustinian canons

== F ==
- Flône Abbey (Abbaye de Flône) at Flône, Amay (Liège) - Augustinian canons
- Floreffe Abbey (Abbaye de Floreffe) at Floreffe (Namur): Premonstratensians
- Florennes Abbey (Abbaye Saint-Jean-Baptiste de Florennes) at Florennes (Namur): Benedictine monks
- Florival Abbey (Abbaye de Florival) at Archennes (Walloon Brabant): Cistercian nuns
- Forest Abbey (Abbaye Notre-Dame de Forest-lez-Bruxelles) at Forest-lez-Bruxelles (Brussels): Benedictine nuns

== G ==
- Gembloux Abbey (Abbaye Saint-Pierre et Exupère de Gembloux) at Gembloux (Namur): Benedictine monks
- Geraardsbergen Abbey (Abdij van Geraardsbergen), previously at Dikkelvenne, at Geraardsbergen (East Flanders): Benedictine monks
- Géronsart Abbey (Abbaye de Géronsart) at Jambes (Namur): Augustinian canons
- Ghent, East Flanders:
  - St. Bavo's Abbey (Sint-Baafsabdij, Gent): Benedictine monks
  - English Ladies, Ghent (Abbaye des Dames anglaises): English Benedictine nuns in exile
  - St. Peter's Abbey, Ghent (Sint-Pietersabdij, Gent): Benedictine monks
  - Abdij Onze-Lieve-Vrouw van het Rijke Gasthuis: Benedictine nuns
- Ghislenghien Abbey (Abbaye du Val des Vierges de Ghislenghien) at Ghislenghien (Hainaut): Benedictine nuns
- Gistel, see Ten Putte
- Groot-Bijgaarden Abbey, also St. Wivina's Abbey (Abdij van Groot-Bijgaarden, also Sint-Wivina-abdij) at Groot-Bijgaarden, Dilbeek (Flemish Brabant): Benedictine nuns
- Grandpré Abbey (Abbaye de Grandpré) at Gesves (Namur): Cistercian monks
- Grimbergen Abbey (Abdij van Grimbergen) at Grimbergen (Flemish Brabant): Premonstratensians
- Groeninge Abbey (Abdij van Groeninge) at Kortrijk (West Flanders): Cistercian nuns

== H ==
- Haaltert Abbey (Abbaye Saint-Géry de Haaltert) at Haaltert (East Flanders): Benedictine monks
- Ter Hage Abbey (Abdij Ter Hage, Terhagen or Tenhagen) first at Axel in the Netherlands, later in Ghent: Cistercian nuns
- Hasselt Priory (Augustijnenklooster Hasselt) at Hasselt (Limburg): Augustinian canons
- Hastière Abbey (Abbaye d'Hastière) at Hastière (Namur): Benedictine monks
- Hemelsdaele Abbey (Abdij van Hemelsdaele) at Hemelsdaele, Bruges (West Flanders): Cistercian nuns
- Hemiksem, see St. Bernard's Abbey, Hemiksem
- Hérinnes Charterhouse (Chartreuse de la Chapelle à Hérinnes) at Hérinnes (Flemish Brabant): Carthusian monks
- Herkenrode Abbey (Abdij van Herkenrode) at Herkenrode, Hasselt (formerly Kuringen) (Limburg): Cistercian nuns
- Heylissem Abbey (Abdij van Heylissem) at Hélécine (Walloon Brabant): Premonstratensians
- Hocht Abbey (Abdij van Hocht) at Lanaken (Limburg): Cistercian monks, then Cistercian nuns
- Hurtebise Monastery (Monastère d'Hurtebise) at Saint-Hubert (Luxembourg): Benedictine nuns

== J ==
- Le Jardinet Abbey (Abbaye du Jardinet) at Walcourt (Namur): Cistercian nuns to 1430, then Cistercian monks

== K ==
- Klaarland Priory or Priory of Our Lady of Klaarland (Priorij Onze-Lieve-Vrouw van Klaarland) at Lozen, Bocholt (Limburg): Trappist nuns
- Kortenberg Abbey (Abdij van Kortenberg) at Kortenberg (Flemish Brabant): Benedictine nuns

== L ==
- Leffe Abbey (Abbaye de Leffe) (extant) at Leffe, Dinant (Namur): Premonstratensians
- Leuven (Flemish Brabant):
  - Groot Begijnhof, Leuven
  - Keizersberg Abbey, also Mont César Abbey (Abdij van Keizersberg, Abdij Regina Coeli, Abbaye du Mont César) in Leuven: Benedictine monks
  - Park Abbey (Abdij van 't Park) at Heverlee, Leuven (Flemish Brabant): Premonstratensians
  - St. Gertrude's Abbey, Leuven: Augustinian Canonesses
  - St. Monica's, Leuven: Augustinian Canonesses
  - St. Michael's College, Leuven: Jesuits
  - Vlierbeek Abbey (Abbaye de Vlierbeek) at Kessel-Lo, Leuven (Flemish Brabant): Benedictine monks
- Liège:
  - Abbey of the Peace of Our Lady, Liège (Abbaye de la Paix-Notre-Dame de Liège): Benedictine nuns
  - St. James' Abbey, Liège (Abbaye Saint-Jacques de Liège): Benedictine monks
  - St. Laurence's Abbey, Liège (Abbaye Saint-Laurent de Liège): Benedictine monks
- Lier Abbey or Abbey of Our Lady of Nazareth, Lier (Abdij van Onze Vrouwe van Nazareth) (later refounded at Brecht: see Brecht Abbey) at Lier (Antwerp): Trappist nuns
- Lier, see Hemiksem
- Lieu-Saint-Bernard Abbey, otherwise Abbaye Saint-Bernard-sur-l'Escaut: see St. Bernard's Abbey, Hemiksem
- Lobbes Abbey (Abbaye Saint-Pierre de Lobbes) (dissolved) at Lobbes, Hainaut: Benedictine monks
- Louvain-la-Neuve, see St. Gertrude's Abbey

== M ==
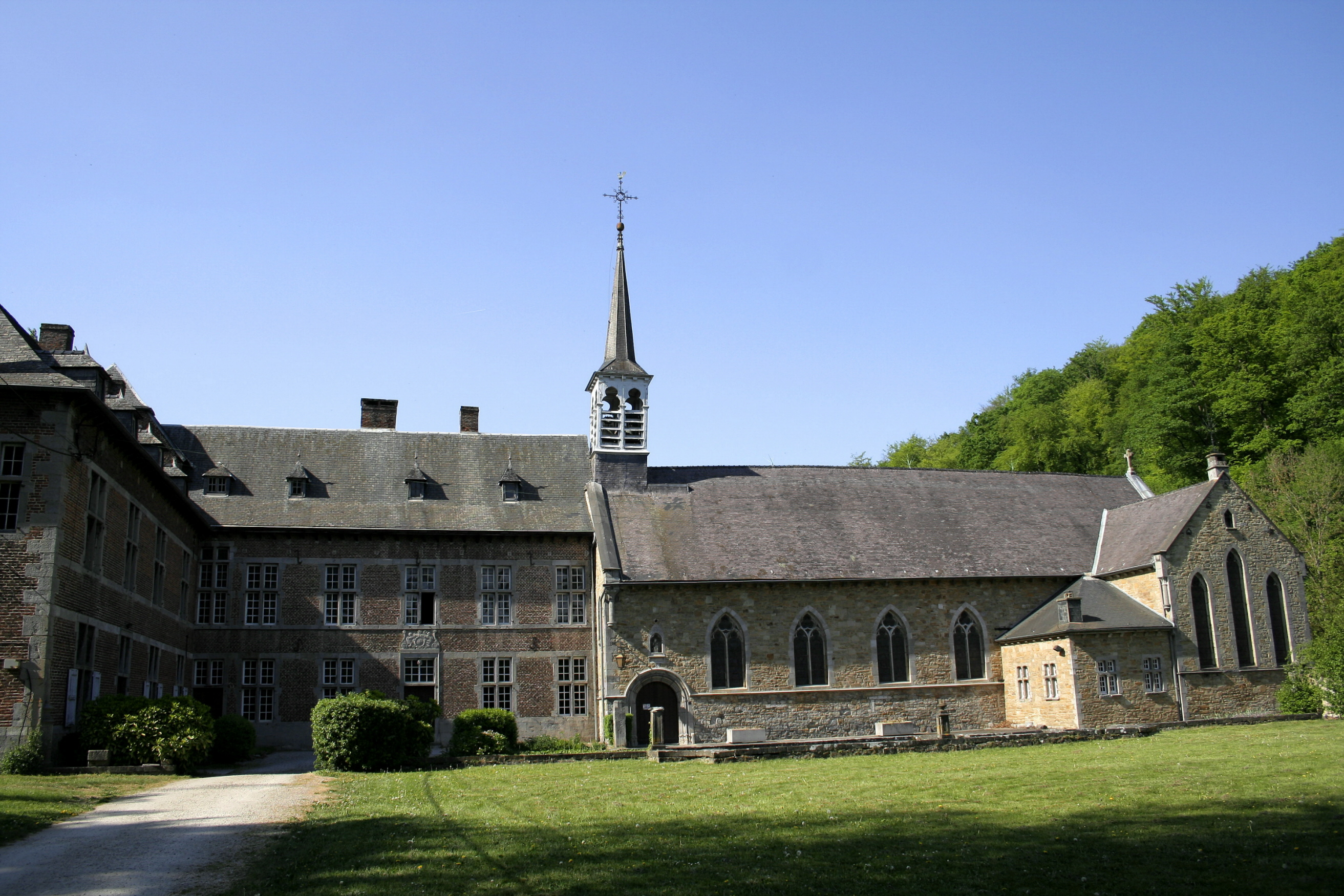
The Abbaye de Marche-les-Dames or Abbaye de Notre-Dame du Vivier at Marche-les-Dames (Namur)

- Maagdendale Abbey (Abdij van Maagdendale) at Oudenaarde (East Flanders): Cistercian nuns
- Maegdendael Abbey (Abdij van Maegdendael) at Oplinter (Flemish Brabant): Cistercian nuns
- Malmedy Abbey (Abbaye de Malmedy) at Malmedy (Liège): administered together with Stavelot Abbey as the Principality of Stavelot-Malmedy, Benedictine monks
- Malonne Abbey (Abbaye Notre-Dame de Malonne) (dissolved) at Malonne (Namur): Benedictine monks
- Marche-les-Dames Abbey (Abbaye de Marche-les-Dames or Abbaye de Notre-Dame du Vivier) at Marche-les-Dames (Namur): women's community of no known order until c. 1235, then Cistercian nuns to 1856; Sisters of St. Vincent de Paul to 1880, Ursulines to 1914, Carmelite sisters to 1973; non-religious boarding school to 1980; the Little Sisters of Bethlehem to 2000; now occupied by the lay community Madonna House
- Maredret Abbey (Abbaye de Maredret) (extant) at Anhée (Namur): Benedictine nuns
- Maredsous Abbey (Abbaye de Maredsous) (extant) at Denée (Namur): Benedictine monks
- Menin Abbey (Abbaye Notre-Dame-de-la-Paix de Menin or Abbaye des Saints-Anges) at Menen (Menin) (West Flanders): Benedictine nuns
- Merkem Abbey (Abbaye Saint-Pierre-et-Notre-Dame de Merkem) at Merkem (West Flanders): Benedictine nuns
- Mesen Abbey or Messines Abbey (Abbaye Notre-Dame de Messines) at Mesen (Messines) (West Flanders): Benedictine nuns
- Mons Abbey (Abbaye de la Paix-Notre-Dame de Mons) at Mons (Hainaut): Benedictine nuns
- Mont César Abbey (Abbaye du Mont César), see Leuven, Keizersberg Abbey
- Mont Cornillon Abbey (Abbaye du Mont-Cornillon) in Liège: Premonstratensian double house
- Mont-d'Or Abbey (Abbaye du Mont-d'Or) at Wevelgem (West Flanders): Cistercian nuns
- Moorsel Abbey (Abbaye de Moorsel) at Moorsel, Aalst (East Flanders): Benedictine nuns
- Moulins-Warnant Abbey (Abbaye de Moulins-Warnant) at Anhée (Namur): community of women (no known rule), then Cistercian nuns 1233–1414, then Cistercian monks
- Mount Thabor Convent, Mechelen (Thaborklooster): Augustinian canonesses
- Munsterbilzen Abbey (Abbaye Saint-Amour de Munsterbilzen) at Munsterbilzen, Bilzen (Limburg): Benedictine nuns

== N ==
- Namur Abbey (Abbaye de la Paix-Notre-Dame de Namur) at Namur: Cistercians
- Nazareth, Our Lady of, see Brecht and Lier
- Nieuwenbosch Abbey (Abdij Nieuwenbosch) at Heusden (East Flanders): Cistercian nuns
- Nieuwpoort Charterhouse (Kartuize Nieuwpoort), also known as Sheen Anglorum Charterhouse, at Nieuwpoort (West Flanders): English Carthusians in exile
- Ninove Abbey (Abbaye de Ninove) at Ninove (East Flanders): Premonstratensians
- Nivelles Abbey (Abbaye Sainte-Gertrude de Nivelles) at Nivelles (Walloon Brabant): women's collegiate foundation
- Nizelles Abbey (Abbaye de Nizelles) at Ophain-Bois-Seigneur-Isaac (Walloon Brabant): Cistercian monks

== O ==
- Abbaye de l'Olive at Morlanwelz (Hainaut): Cistercian nuns
- Abdij van Onze-Lieve-Vrouw ter Nieuwe Plant, see Ypres
- Oost-Eekloo Abbey (Abdij van Oost-Eekloo) at Oosteeklo and later Ghent (East Flanders): Cistercian nuns
- Orienten Abbey (Abbaye d'Orienten) at Rummen (Flemish Brabant): Cistercian nuns
- Orval Abbey (Abbaye Notre-Dame d'Orval) (extant) at Villers-devant-Orval, Florenville (Luxembourg): Benedictine monks, then Canons Regular, then Cistercian monks, then Trappist monks
- Oudenaarde Abbey (Abdji van Oudenaarde) at Oudenaarde (East Flanders): Benedictine monks
- Oudenburg Abbey (Abdij van Oudenburg) at Oudenburg (West Flanders): Benedictine monks

== P ==
- Parc-les-Dames Abbey (Abbaye de Parc-les-Dames) at Wezemaal (Flemish Brabant): Cistercian nuns
- Postel Abbey (Abdij van Postel) (extant) at Postel, Mol (Antwerp): Premonstratensians
- Ten Putte Abbey (Abdij Ten Putte, also Sint-Godelieveabdij) (extant) at Gistel (West Flanders): Benedictine nuns

== Q ==
- Quévy Abbey (Abbaye de Quévy) at Quévy (Hainaut): Benedictine monks

== R ==
- La Ramée Abbey (Abbaye de la Ramée) (extant) at Jauchelette, Jodoigne (Walloon Brabant): Cistercian nuns
- Robermont Abbey (Abbaye de Robermont) at Robermont (Liège): Cistercian nuns
- Rochefort Abbey or St. Rémy's Abbey, Rochefort (Abbaye Notre-Dame de Saint-Rémy) (extant) at Rochefort (Namur): Cistercian nuns to 1464, then Cistercian monks, then Trappist monks
- Roesbrugge Abbey (Abdij van Roesbrugge) at Roesbrugge (West Flanders): Canonesses Regular (see also Onze-Lieve-Vrouw ter Nieuwe Plant, Ypres)
- Roeulx Abbey (Abbaye Saint-Feuillien du Roeulx) at Le Roeulx (Hainaut): Premonstratensians
- Ronse Abbey (Abdij van Ronse) at Ronse (East Flanders): Benedictine monks
- Ten Roosen Abbey (Abdij Ten Roosen) at Aalst (East Flanders): Cistercian nuns
- Roosenberg Abbey (Abdij van Roosenberg) at Waasmunster (East Flanders): Canonesses Regular
- Roosendael Abbey (Abdij van Roosendael) at Sint-Katelijne-Waver (Antwerp): Cistercian nuns
- Rothem Abbey (Abdij van Rothem) at Haelen (Limburg): Cistercian nuns
- Rouge-Cloître Abbey (Abbaye du Rouge-Cloître, Abbaye Saint-Paul en Soignes) in Averghem (south-eastern Brussels): Augustinian canons

== S ==
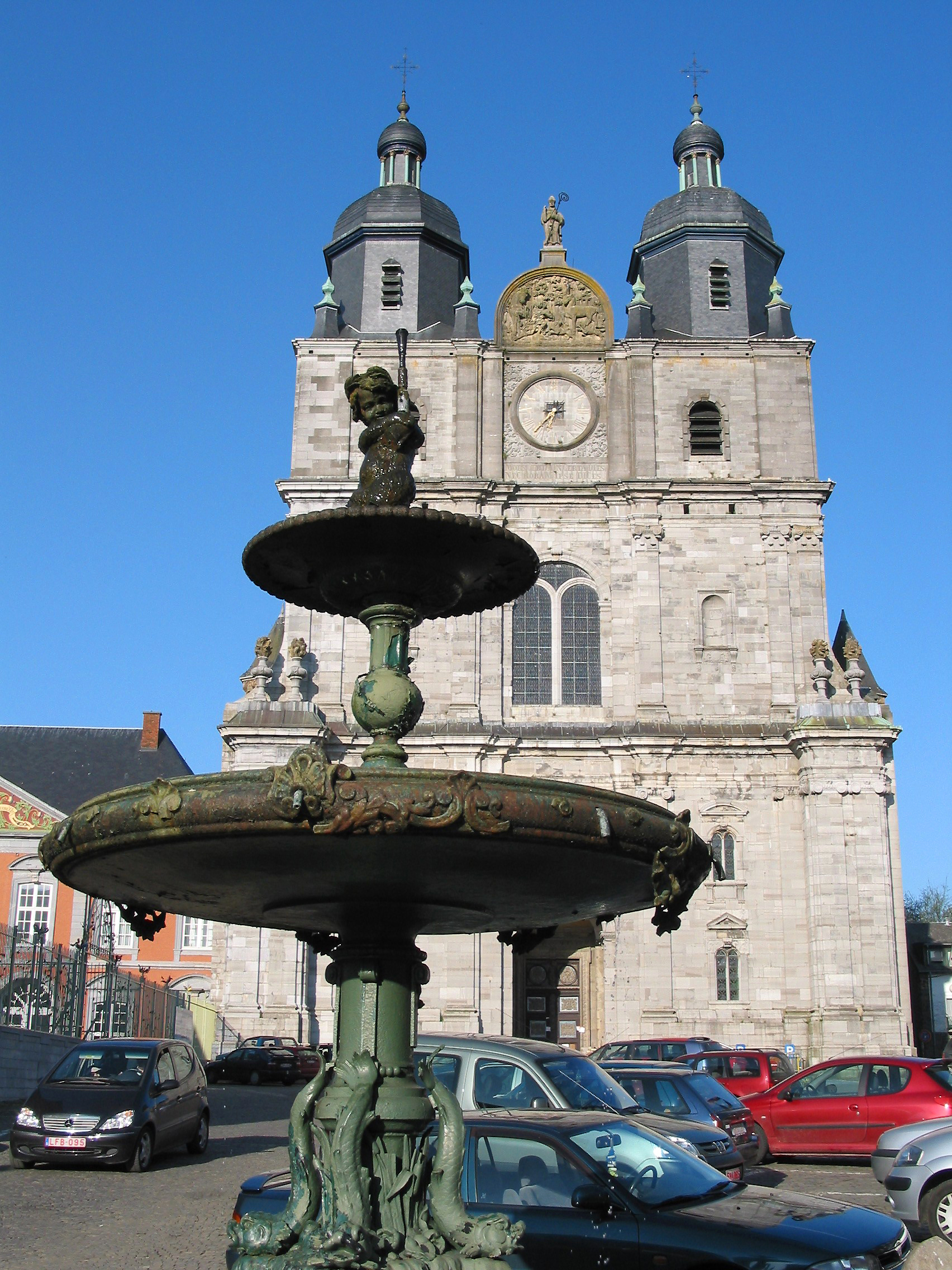
Saint-Hubert

- St. Andrew's Abbey, Bruges, see Bruges
- St. Bernard's Abbey, Bornem (extant), formerly Bornem Abbey (Sint-Bernardusabdij, Bornem or Abdij van Bornem) at Bornem (Antwerp): Cistercian monks
- St. Bernard's Abbey, Hemiksem, also St. Bernard's Abbey on the Scheldt (Sint Bernaerdts op Scheldt or Sint Bernardusabdij) at Hemiksem (Antwerp) (moved to St. Bernard's Abbey, Bornem, in 1836): Cistercian monks
- Abbey of Saint-Denis-en-Broqueroie (Abbaye de Saint-Denis-en-Broqueroie) at Saint-Denis, Mons (Hainaut): Benedictine monks
- St. Gertrude's Abbey (Abbaye Sainte-Gertrude de Louvain-la-Neuve) at Louvain-la-Neuve: Benedictine nuns
  - see also St. Gertrude's Abbey, Leuven
- Saint-Ghislain Abbey (Abbaye de Saint-Ghislain or Saint-Pierre-Saint-Paul de la Celle) at Saint-Ghislain (Hainaut): Benedictines
- St. Godelieve's Abbey, Bruges, see Bruges
- St. Godelieve's Abbey, Gistel, see Ten Putte Abbey
- Saint-Hubert Abbey (Abbaye Saint Pierre-Saint-Paul de Saint-Hubert) at Saint-Hubert (Luxembourg): Benedictine monks
- St. Michael's Abbey, see Antwerp
- Saint-Rémy Abbey, see Rochefort
- St. Sixtus' Abbey, Westvleteren, see Westvleteren
- Sint-Truiden (Limburg):
  - Sint-Truiden Abbey (Abdij van Sint-Truiden): Benedictine monks
  - St. Catherine's Abbey, Sint-Truiden (Abdij Sint-Katrien van Sint-Truiden): Benedictine nuns
  - Zeppern Charterhouse, see Zepperen
- St. Trudo's Abbey, Bruges (Sint-Trudoabdij), formerly at Male, now back in Bruges, West Flanders: Canonesses Regular of the Holy Sepulchre
- St. Wivina's Abbey, see Groot-Bijgarden
- Salzinnes Abbey (Abbaye de Salzinnes) at Salzinnes (Namur): Cistercian nuns
- Saulchoir Abbey (Abbaye du Saulchoir) at Kain in Tournai (Hainaut): Cistercian nuns
- Scheut Charterhouse (Kartuizerkloster Scheut) at Anderlecht (Brussels): Carthusian monks
- Scourmont Abbey (Abbaye Notre-Dame de Scourmont) (extant) at Forges, Chimay (Hainaut): Trappist monks
- Sheen Anglorum, see Nieuwpoort Charterhouse
- Sinnich Abbey (Abdij van Sinnich) near Teuven, Voeren (Limburg): Augustinian canonesses
- Soleilmont Abbey (Abbaye Notre-Dame de Soleilmont) (extant) at Gilly (Hainaut): Trappist nuns
- Solières Abbey (Abbaye de Solières) at Ben-Ahin (Liège): Cistercian nuns
- Spermaillie Abbey (Abbaye de Spermaillie) at Bruges: Cistercian nuns
- Stavelot Abbey (Abbaye de Stavelot) at Stavelot (Liège): together with Malmedy Abbey formed the Principality of Stavelot-Malmedy, Benedictine monks
- Steenbrugge Abbey or St. Peter's Abbey, Steenbrugge (St-Pietersabdij Steenbrugge) (extant) in Assebroek, Bruges (West Flanders): Benedictine monks

== T ==
- Tongerlo Abbey (Abdij van Tongerlo) (extant) at Tongerlo, Westerlo (Antwerp): Premonstratensians
- Tongeren Abbey (Abdij van Tongeren) at Tongeren (Limburg): Benedictine monks
- Tournai Abbey (Abbaye Saint-Martin de Tournai) at Tournai (Hainaut): Benedictine monks

== V ==
- Val-Benoît Abbey (Abbaye de Val-Benoît) at Liège: Cistercian nuns
- Val-du-Ciel Abbey (Abbaye de Val-du-Ciel) at Ophoven (Limburg): Cistercian nuns
- Val-Dieu Abbey (Abbaye de Val-Dieu or Abbaye Notre-Dame du Val-Dieu; Abdij van Godsdal) at Aubel (Liège): Cistercian monks
- Val-Notre-Dame Abbey (Abbaye de Val-Notre-Dame) at Antheit (Liège): Cistercian nuns
- Val-Saint-Bernard Abbey (Abbaye du Val-Saint-Bernard) at Diest (Flemish Brabant): Cistercian nuns
- Val-Saint-Lambert Abbey (Abbaye de Val-Saint-Lambert) at Seraing (Liège): Cistercian monks
- Abbaye du Val-Saint-Georges, Cistercians: see Salzinnes
- Val des Vierges, see Ghislenghien Abbey
- Valduc Abbey (Abbaye de Valduc) at Hamme-Mille, Beauvechain (Walloon Brabant): Cistercian nuns
- Vellereille-les-Brayeux, see Bonne-Esperance Abbey
- La Vignette Abbey (Abbaye de la Vignette) at Leuven: Cistercian nuns
- Villers-la-Ville Abbey (Abbaye de Villers-la-Ville) at Villers-la-Ville (Walloon Brabant): Cistercian monks
- Vivegnis Abbey (Abbaye de Vivegnis) at Liège: Cistercian nuns
- Vivier, Abbaye Notre-Dame du, see Marche-les-Dames Abbey

== W ==
- Waulsort Abbey (Abbaye Notre-Dame de Waulsort) at Waulsort, Hastière (Namur): Benedictine monks
- Wauthier-Braine Abbey (Abbaye de Wauthier-Braine) at Wauthier-Braine (Walloon Brabant): Cistercian nuns
- Wavreumont Abbey or St. Remaclus' Abbey, Wavreumont (Abbaye Saint Remacle de Wavreumont) at Wavreumont (Liège): Benedictine monks
- Westmalle Abbey (Abdij van Onze-Lieve-Vrouw van het Heilig Hart van Westmalle) at Malle (Antwerp): Trappist monks
- Westvleteren Abbey or St. Sixtus' Abbey, Westvleteren (Sint-Sixtus-Abdij) (extant) at Westvleteren (West Flanders): Trappist monks
- Ten Wijngaerde, see Bruges

== Y ==
- Ypres (West Flanders):
  - Irish Ladies (Abbaye des Dames irlandaises d'Ypres): Irish Benedictine nuns in exile
  - Abbey of Onze-Lieve-Vrouw ter Nieuwe Plant (Roesbrugge Dames), formerly Roesbrugge Abbey: Canonesses Regular
  - St. John au Mont Abbey (Abbaye Saint-Jean-au-Mont d'Ypres): Benedictine monks

== Z ==
- Zelem Charterhouse, also Diest Charterhouse, at Zelem near Halen (Limburg): Carthusians
- Zepperen Charterhouse (dissolved) at Zepperen, Sint-Truiden (Limburg): Carthusians
- Zevenkerken, see St. Andrew's Abbey, Bruges
- Zonnebeke Abbey (Abbaye Sainte-Marie de Zonnebeke) at Zonnebeke, Ypres (West Flanders): Benedictine nuns
- Zwijveke Abbey (Abdij van Zwijveke) at Zwijveke, Dendermonde (East Flanders): Cistercian nuns
