= St. Trudo's Abbey, Bruges =

Abbey in West Flanders, Belgium

Coordinates: 51°12′33″N 3°17′19″E

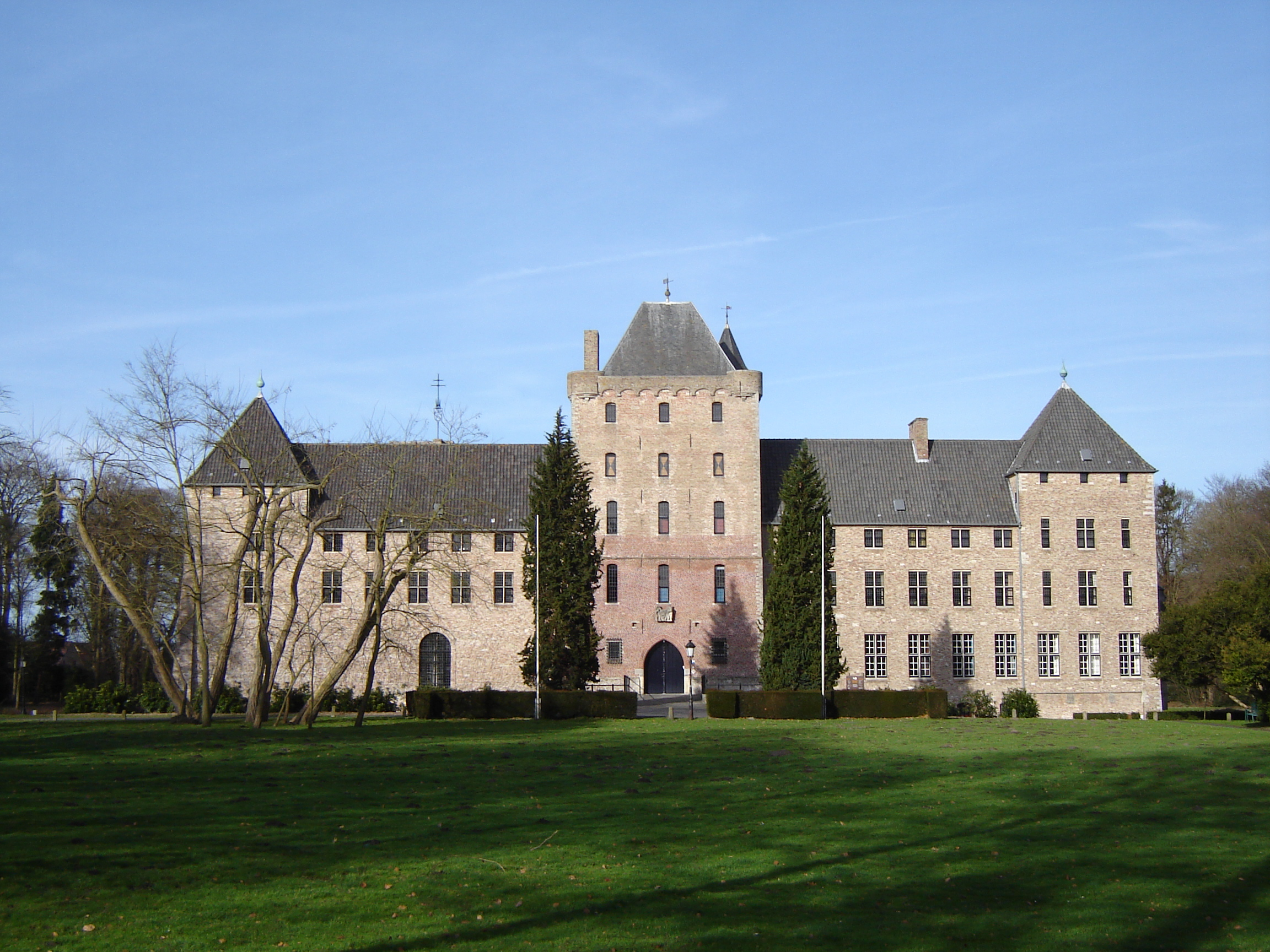
Male Castle

Male Castle, Bruges (Dutch: Grafelijk Slot van Male). A community of the Canonesses Regular of the Holy Sepulchre. It originated in Bruges in the 11th century, and between 1954 and 2013 was settled in Male Castle in Male, Sint-Kruis, Bruges, West Flanders, Belgium.

== History ==
The origins of St. Trudo's Abbey are believed to go back to about 1050, when the hermit Everelmus settled near the entrance to the city of Bruges where the road to Ghent crosses the River Reie. There he built a small oratory and dedicated it to Saint Bartholomew. Like other hermits, Everelmus attracted followers, who gradually formed a community, which was referred to as servi Dei ("servants of God") in the charter of 1130 by which Thierry, Count of Flanders, gave them the piece of ground on which they lived. As the mixed community of the servi Dei or pauperes Christi monachis of the Eekhoute, as they became known, grew bigger it required more organisation. In about 1146 therefore they joined the congregation of the Canons Regular of Arrouaise. The Eekhoute was elevated to Eekhout Abbey, with Lambertus as first abbot.

The rule of Arrouaise prescribed that the female members of the community had to live separately, and from 1149 they occupied a property at Odegem (Steenbrugge) belonging to St. Martin's Abbey in Tournai. A church was attached to it which was dedicated to Saint Trudo, and for that reason the sisters adopted Saint Trudo as their patron. As St. Trudo's Priory they became a dependent priory of Eekhout Abbey. The abbey received Papal confirmation in 1180; the document contains the first reference to Canons Regular living according to the Rule of St. Augustine.

Gradually difficulties arose between the abbey and its priory, which eventually led to a break between the two communities. At the joint request of both of them the separation was declared on 23 August 1248 by Walter van Marvis, bishop of Tournai. In the same year the sisters joined the Congregation of St. Victor, and the priory was elevated to an abbey; the prioress Ursilia was declared the new abbess. To help them make a good start the bishop allowed some sisters to transfer from Roesbrugge Abbey, which had attached itself to St. Victor's previously.

In 1261 a bolt of lightning caused the abbey and its church to burn down, killing several sisters. The buildings were rebuilt, but closer to the road to Courtrai.

In 1456 the sisters accepted the reforms of and joined the Congregation of Windesheim, which had consequences for the parish, over which the abbey had rights of patronage. In 1503 the parish itself also signed up to the reforms. A period of flowering followed, which lasted until 1560 and the Protestant Reformation.

In 1566 the sisters were forced by the Geuzes to flee into Bruges, where they had just bought a house of refuge, St. Bavo's on the Garenmarkt. They were able to return in 1567, but had to flee again in 1572, and were obliged to sell all their goods. The abbey was plundered by the Gentenaars in 1579 and set on fire in 1580. Later the abbey farm was also troubled first by marauding Spanish troops and later by French ones.

The sisters therefore settled permanently in Bruges, where they had bought the monastery of the Staelyzer Brothers on the New Ghent Road. They included a small school in their duties, and for that reason escaped closure under the rationalist reforms of the Emperor Joseph II. They remained until the French Revolution, when they were expelled on the suppression of the abbey by the French troops in November 1796; it was later largely demolished. In 1797 they were able to buy back the abbey farm, but sold it in 1803 to buy an annuity to provide the sisters with the means of sustenance.

In 1816 the abbey in Bruges on the New Ghent Road was discreetly refounded by seven sisters who managed to buy back the former priest's house of the old abbey. In 1835 they found themselves able to fund new abbey buildings. In 1866 the community affiliated itself to the Canons Regular of the Lateran. Their financial problems grew steadily up to World War I, and after 1921 they were unable to accept new novices. The situation worsened further, but in 1952 the community joined the Order of the Holy Sepulchre, which had a priory at Lochem (later relocated to Maarssen). Five canonesses from Lochem and three from Turnhout strengthened the Bruges community.

In 1954 they moved to Male Castle at Male, a village in Sint-Kruis, a sub-district of Bruges, and began its repair and restoration. The community gradually increased to 30 and in 1963 the first new novice at Male was professed. Priory was once again restored to the status of an abbey, having been downgraded some twenty year previously, with Sister Adelheid Goedertier as the first abbess. Much attention was paid to the liturgy, and from 1978 to 1995 much work was devoted to setting the Dutch-language Liturgy of the Hours to music. The duty of welcoming visitors also received much emphasis.

In 2011 the sisters, unable to continue the burdensome maintenance of so large and historic a property, sold the abbey at Male to a private individual, and in October 2013 settled in their new premises, a small monastery on the Oude Osteendse Steenweg in Sint-Pieters Brugge.

== Bibliography ==
- Verschelde, Karel, "Onderaardse weg van de H. Bloedcapelle naar Male (legende)", Rond den Heerd, 1877
- Cafmeyer, Magda, "Het kasteel van Male", Handelingen van het Genootschap voor Geschiedenis te Brugge, 1946
- Sister Maria Jozefa, Het grafelijk slot van Male, Bruges, 1960
- De Cloedt, Filips, OSB, "Nieuwbouw en restauratie in de Sint-Trudo-abdij te Male", Vlaanderen, 1966
- Sister Maria Ludovica, "Henriette Haeck (zuster Maria Jozefa)", in Nationaal Biografisch Woordenboek, vol. 3, Brussels, 1968
- Cafmeyer, Magda, Sint-Kruis, oud en nieuw, Sint-Kruis, 1970
- De Cloedt, Filips, OSB,"De abdij van Male", Vlaanderen, 1973
- Sister P. Huisman, "Male", Vlaanderen, 1973
- Jong Kristen Onthaal voor Toerisme, Male, burcht en abdij, Bruges, 1981
- Duyck, René, Sint-Kruis, Bruges, 1987
- Deckerck, Nele, De Sint-Trudoabdij te Brugge, 1584–1796, Bruges, 1998
- Sisters P. Huisman & Kristina van Wonterghem, Het Obituarium van de Sint-Trudoabdij te Odegem, te Brugge en te Male, 1149–2002, Bruges, 2002
