= Wauthier-Braine Abbey =

Nunnery in Walloon Brabant, Belgium

Coordinates: 50°40′59″N 4°17′45″E

Wauthier-Braine abbey (French: Abbaye de Wauthier-Braine) was a Cistercian nunnery located at Wauthier-Braine in Walloon Brabant, Belgium.

== History ==
The abbey was founded by three sisters, Beatrix, Oda and Ida, at the beginning of the 13th century. It was pillaged by French revolutionary troops in 1794 when the 24 nuns then resident were expelled. The abbey was subsequently suppressed.

The property was sold off in 1797, after which the church was demolished. The conventual buildings were also gradually removed: the last of them disappeared shortly before World War II.

All that remains of the abbey are some 18th-century brick cellars, of which the vaulted bays are supported on masonry pillars of various materials, located at the present 6 Rue de l'Abbaye de Citeaux.

== See also ==
- Nizelles Abbey
