= Eekhout =

Eekhout is a Dutch surname. Notable people with the surname include:

- Blanca Eekhout (born 1968), Venezuelan politician
- Jan Eekhout (1900–1978), Dutch writer, poet and translator

== See also ==
- Greg van Eekhout, American writer
- Eekhout Abbey, a medieval house of Augustinian Canons in Bruges, West Flanders, Belgium
