= Marie de Villermont =

Marie de Villermont (1848–1925), countess of Hennequin, was a Belgian artist, writer and feminist.

== Life ==
Marie Emma Éloïse Françoise de Villermont was born at Saint-Josse-ten-Noode on 16 August 1848, the eldest of nine children of the industrialist Antoine Charles Hennequin de Villermont and his second wife, Marie-Adélaïde Licot, and the granddaughter of admiral Athanase de Villermont.

Training as a painter, Villermont was a member of the Cercle des femmes peintres from 1888. Besides painting, she dedicated herself to writing for such periodicals as La Revue générale and La femme belge (which she also supported financially from 1913 to 1925). She was not only a contributor but also co-editor of La Revue Mauve, an up-market magazine about social and cultural issues published in Brussels from 1897 to 1899. A series of her essays on feminism was later published as the book Le Mouvement féministe: Ses causes, son avenir, solution chrétienne (1900).

In the early twentieth century, Villermont wrote a number of books, including biographies of Veronica Giuliani and Isabella Clara Eugenia.

Her efforts to better the circumstances of women were not limited to writing. In 1903 she founded the first union of farming women at Ermeton-sur-Biert, leading to the establishment of the Cercle de Fermières at Namur in 1909.

At the beginning of the First World War she ran a dressing station at her castle, until it was requisitioned by the Germans.

She died at Ermeton-sur-Biert (Namur) on 8 January 1925.

== Works ==
- Histoire de la coiffure féminine (Brussels, 1891). Paris, 1892 edition available on Gallica.bnf.fr.
- Grands seigneurs d'autrefois: Le duc et la duchesse de Bournonville et la cour de Bruxelles (Brussels, 1904).
- Un groupe mystique allemand: étude sur la vie religieuse au Moyen-Age (Brussels, 1906).
- Sainte Véronique Giuliani, abbesse des capucines, 1660-1727 (Paris, 1910).
- L'Infante Isabelle, Gouvernante des Pays-Bas (Paris, 1912).
- Contes belges (Paris, 1913).
- Contes de guerre et de paix (Paris, 1920).
- Au temps jadis (Brussels, 1921).
- Le duc Charles de Croy et d'Arschot et ses femmes Marie de Brimeu et Dorothée de Croy (Brussels, 1923).

== Awards ==
In 1914 the Académie française awarded Villermont a Montyon Prize for her L'Infante Isabelle (1912).

== Sources ==
- Joseph Daoust (ed.), Une Amitié de J. K. Huysmans: Lettres inédites a Marie de Villermont, 1897-1907 (Lille, 1960).
