= Bois-Seigneur-Isaac Abbey =

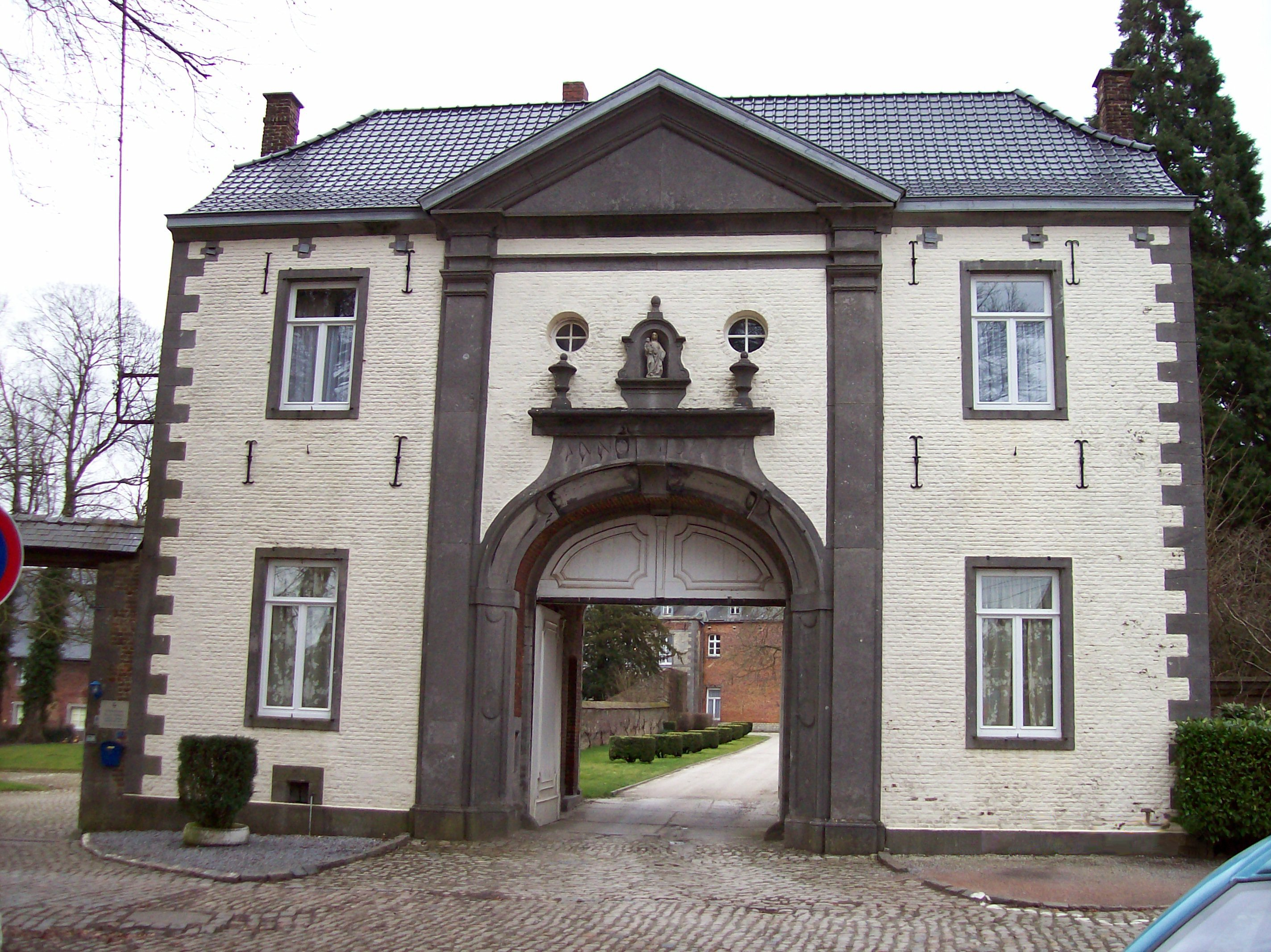
- Main entrance to the priory
- Interactive map of Bois-Seigneur-Isaac Abbey

Monastery information
- Other name: Saint Charbel’s Monastery
- Order: Augustinian then Premonstratensian Then Lebanese Maronite Order
- Established: 1413

Site
- Location: Ophain-Bois-Seigneur-Isaac, Wallonia, Belgium
- Coordinates: 50.644°N 4.322°E

Bois-Seigneur-Isaac Abbey is a former Augustinian abbey in Wallonia, then a Premonstratensian priory, dependent on Averbode Abbey and now occupied by the Lebanese Maronite Order. It is located in Ophain-Bois-Seigneur-Isaac, Belgium (a village now part of the town of Braine-l'Alleud).

== History ==
=== Origins - legend or history? ===
In the 11th century Lord Isaac (Seigneur Isaac) set out on Crusade and was taken prisoner by the Saracens, but was miraculously freed following a vision of the Virgin Mary. On returning to his lands he built a wooden chapel dedicated to Our Lady of Grace and Consolation, with a statue venerated for nearly two centuries. In 1336 the neighbouring village of Ittre, suffering the Black Death, won permission from the bishop of Cambrai (whose diocese included Brabant) to carry the statue in procession through their village. It was found that the plague abated wherever the statue passed and so the villagers refused to hand back the statue which had protected them so well, finally winning the bishop's agreement to keep it and place a new statue in the chapel of Bois-Seigneur-Isaac.

=== Augustinian abbey ===
Better documented is the eucharistic miracle which occurred here on 5 June 1405. On that day, whilst celebrating mass, the parish priest of Ittre found a fragment of the consecrated host in the corporal, which, when he took it in his hands, began to bleed. The bishop of Cambrai investigated the miracle and in 1410 declared it genuine and allowed the chapel to become a place of pilgrimage. Augustinian canons were summoned to the site in 1413 to attend to the spiritual needs of the growing number of pilgrims and the priory the canons established soon became autonomous, becoming an independent abbey in 1416 as the abbey of Bois-Seigneur-Isaac (Abbatia Silvae Domini-Isaac), a member of the reformist Congregation of Windesheim.

The small Gothic chapel built over the site of the miracle, which is still the priory church, is the oldest building of the complex and is surmounted by an elegant bell tower. The year 1593 on a keystone shows that it was built in phases, with nearly 200 years between the start and completion of the works. It has a 16th-century ceiling, decorated stalls, paintings of the miracle (by J. Crockaert, 1777), a double-naved sacristy, a polychrome statue of the Virgin and Child, a reliquary and a monstrance.

The French Wars of Religion saw the abbey ravaged by the troops of William the Silent in 1580 and the canons forced to flee. Once it was possible to return they did so and rebuilt the abbey, continuing to serve pilgrims until the end of the 18th century. During the French Revolution, Bois-Seigneur-Isaac and all other religious houses were suppressed by the law of 15 Fructidor (1795), and the monks expelled the following year. The local population intervened and although the cloister was demolished and part of the buildings turned into a farm, the chapel survived and was served by a chaplain throughout the 19th century.

=== Premonstratensian abbey ===
When the Republican law of 1903 expelled all monks from France, the canons from Mondaye Abbey lived in exile at Bois-Seigneur-Isaac, buying and rebuilding the abbey ruins, turning the chapel into the monastery's church, and renewing and promoting the local devotion to the Holy Blood. The abbey again became an important pilgrimage and spiritual centre. In 1921 the canons were allowed to return to Mondaye and handed over Bois-Seigneur-Isaac to their co-brothers of Averbode Abbey, who ensured the continuity of monastic life and pastoral services there.

In 1957 Bois-Seigneur-Isaac officially became a priory dependent on Averbode. The number of pilgrims has dropped dramatically, but the devotion remains active via a Fraternity of the Holy Blood set up in 1900. On major festivals, the Wednesday before Pentecost (the anniversary of the miracle), 1 July (feast of the Holy Blood) and the first Sunday after 8 September (Birth of Our Lady), major celebrations are held, with a procession of the sacrament along the village streets.

=== Lebanese Maronite Monastery ===
When the Lebanese Maronite Order arrived in 2010, the monks brought with them relics of Saint Charbel. The devotion for the Holy Blood remains and is now accompanied by that of Saint Charbel. The number of pilgrims is growing especially from the Oriental Churches.

== See also ==
- Catholic Church in Belgium
