= Ermeton-sur-Biert =

Ermeton-sur-Biert Ermeton-so-Bier (Walloon)
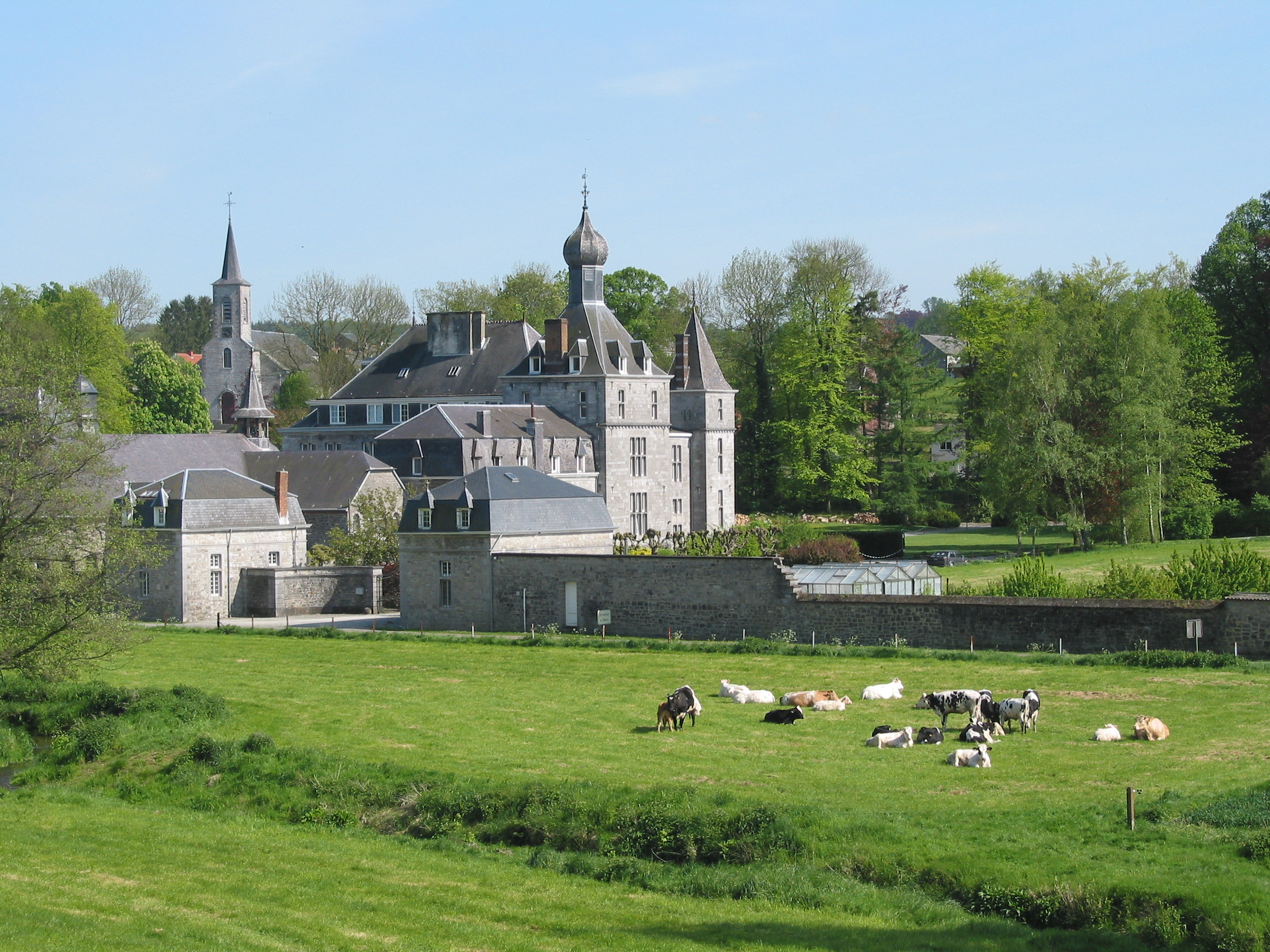
- Ermeton Abbey, formerly Ermeton Castle

- Location in Belgium
- Coordinates: 50.298°N 4.720°E
- Country: Belgium
- Region: Wallonia
- Province: Namur
- Municipality: Mettet
- Postal codes: 5644

Ermeton-sur-Biert (French pronunciation: [ɛʁmətɔ̃ syʁ bjɛʁ]; Walloon: Ermeton-so-Bier) is a village of Wallonia and a district of the municipality of Mettet, located in the province of Namur, Belgium.

There is a 14th-century castle in the village, which since 1936 has been in use as Ermeton Abbey and in 1973 was designated a heritage site.

== History ==
The lordship of Ermeton was created in the early 14th century by John I, Marquis of Namur. The last heir to the lordship, Henry de Villermont, died in combat in 1914.

In 1903 Belgium's first union of farming women was founded at Ermeton-sur-Biert, leading to the establishment of the Cercle de Fermières at Namur in 1909.

== Notable people ==
- Marie de Villermont
