= Ermeton Abbey =

- Monastère des Bénédictines d'Ermeton
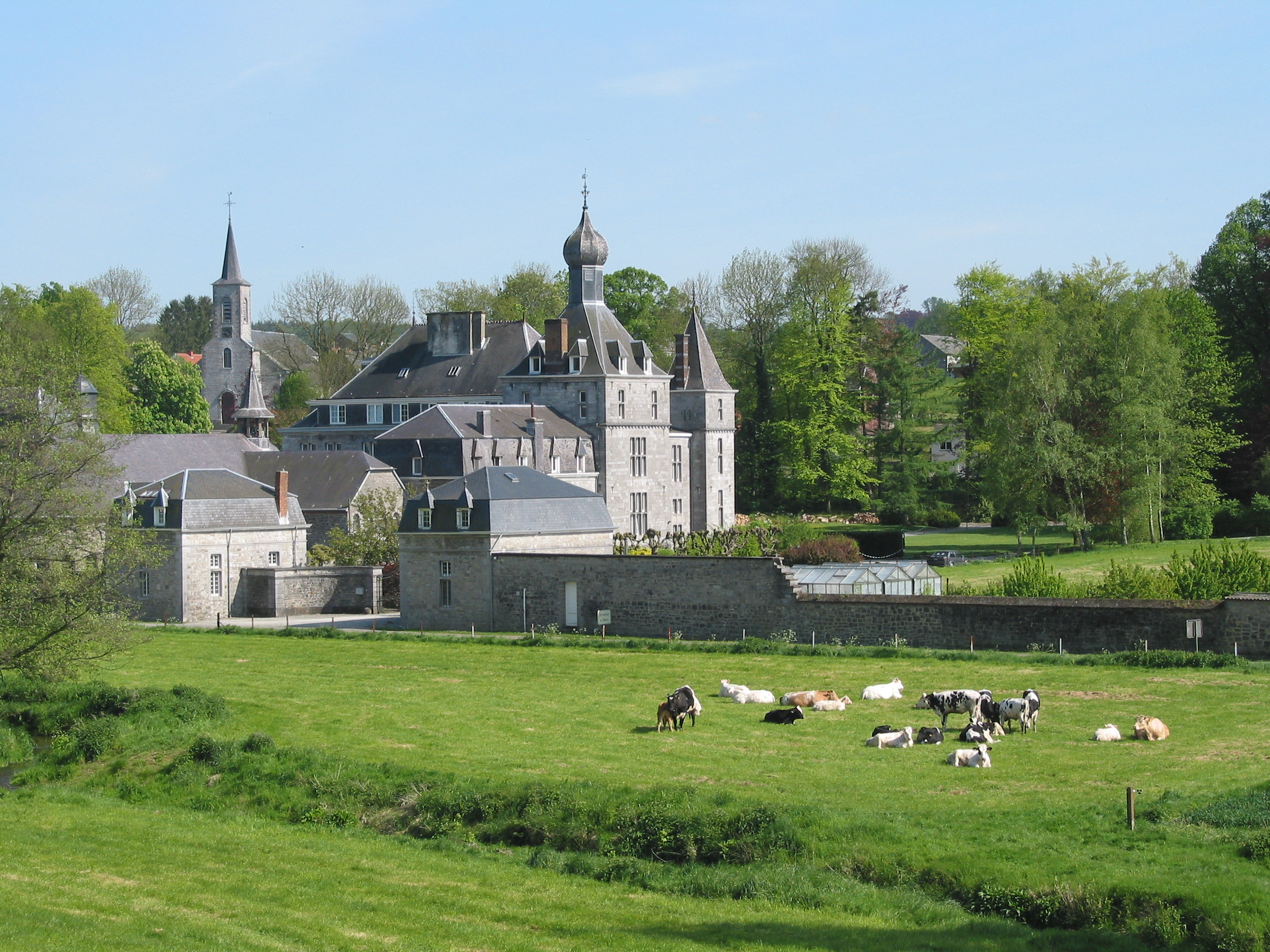
- Ermeton Abbey, formerly Ermeton Castle
- Interactive map of Ermeton Abbey

Monastery information
- Order: Order of Saint Benedict
- Established: 1936
- Diocese: Namur

Architecture
- Functional status: monastery
- Heritage designation: listed built heritage
- Designated date: 1973

Site
- Coordinates: 50.2988°N 4.7170°E
- Website: http://www.ermeton.be/index.php

Ermeton Abbey (French: Abbaye d'Ermeton) is a monastery of Benedictine nuns in a medieval castle in the village of Ermeton-sur-Biert, Wallonia, Belgium.

== Castle ==
In the early 14th century, John I, Marquis of Namur made Jacquemin de Bossoit lord of Ermeton. The lordship passed by inheritance for 300 years until bought by ironmaster Richard Godart in 1612. In 1856, Antoinette de Mérode, princess of Monaco, sold the castle, which in 1870 passed by marriage to the Villermont family. The last heir of the Villermonts, Count Henry de Villermont, died in combat on 5 September 1914, and is commemorated at the entrance to the castle. In 1936, the castle was rented by a community of Benedictine nuns, who bought it outright in 1942. The building was designated as built heritage of Belgium in 1973.

== Community ==
The community of Benedictine nuns that moved to Ermeton in 1936 had been founded in Brussels in 1917 by Eugène Vandeur, a monk of Maredsous Abbey.

The monastery operates a guesthouse.

Two other abbeys, both now independent houses, were founded from Ermeton: Maria Heimsuchung in Steinfeld (Kall, North Rhine-Westphalia), Germany, and Abadia Santa Maria de Guadalupe, Ahuatepec, Mexico.
