= Nizelles Abbey =

- Abbaye de Nizelles
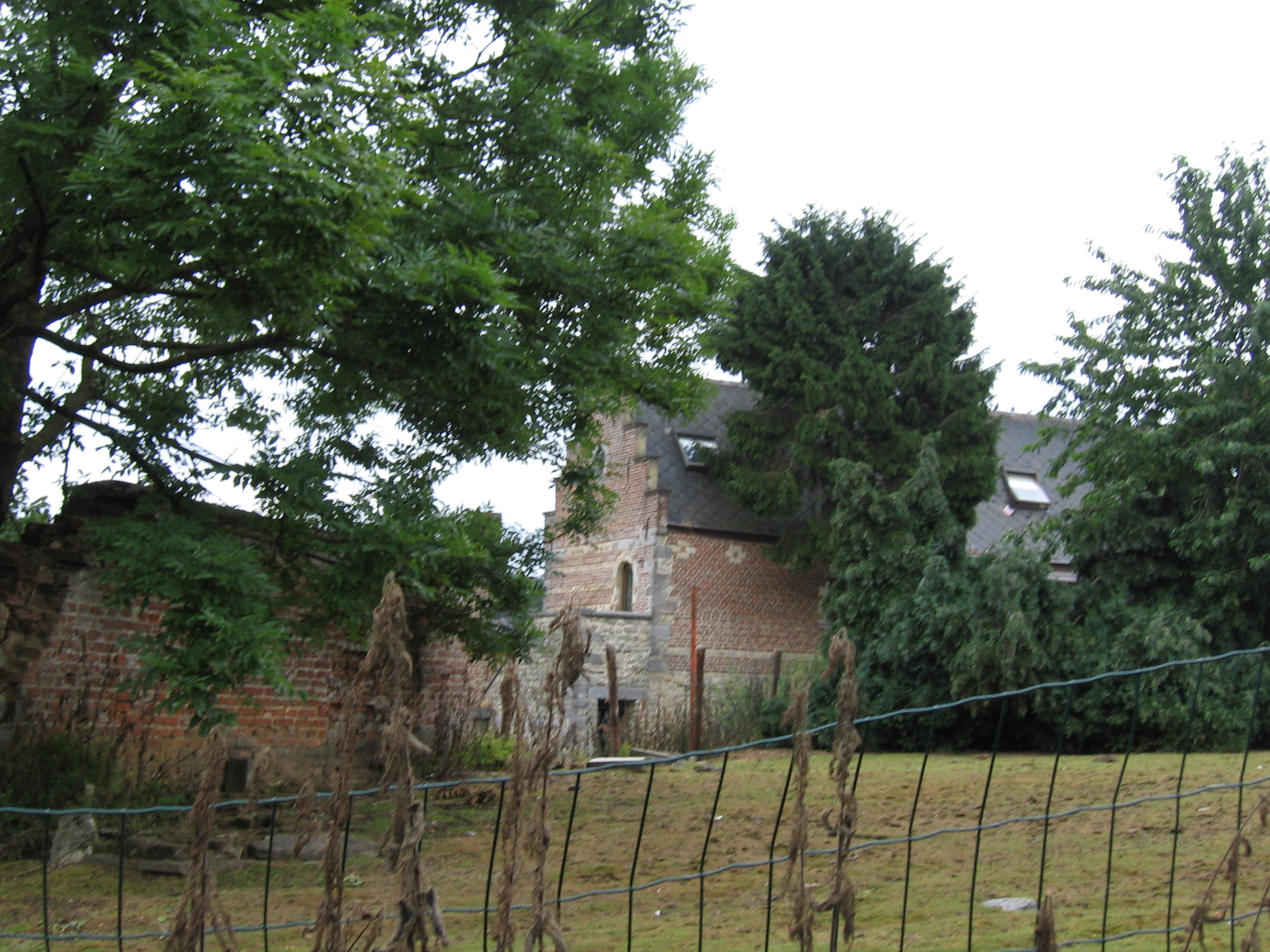
- Some remains of the abbey farm

- Location within Belgium

General information
- Coordinates: 50°39′53″N 4°18′52″E

Nizelles Abbey (French: Abbaye de Nizelles) was an abbey of Cistercian monks located in Wallonia in Ophain-Bois-Seigneur-Isaac in Braine-l'Alleud, Walloon Brabant, Belgium, on a short distance to the south of Brussels.

It was founded in 1441, which makes it one of the last Cistercian foundations in the Southern Netherlands, and it was closed down in 1783 under a decree from the "Enlightenment Emperor", Joseph II, probably as part of his wider programme of closing down as "unnecessary" monasteries in the Habsburg lands identified as "purely contemplative".

Less than twenty years ago it was extensively restored: it has been relaunched as a high-end conference centre.

== Origins ==
The abbey originated as a little college set up by the monks from Moulins-Warnant Abbey to educate younger members of the local nobility. Over the years a succession of donations from grateful former pupils, backed up by generous financial support from Christine de Franckenberg, abbess over the canonesses at nearby Nivelles, made it possible for the little priory at Nizelles to be expanded into an abbey.

A new church was consecrated in 1441 by John of Burgundy, Bishop of Cambrai. The first abbot, Jean de Mons, received benediction from the bishop in the presence of Gérard de Louvain, the abbot of Villers. The act recognising the new foundation nevertheless stipulated that it should continue to be a daughter house of Moulins-Warnant Abbey.

== Fifteenth to seventeenth centuries: troubled times ==
Unfortunately the generous benefactress died the next year, in 1442, and the money stopped flowing. There followed more than three centuries during which the abbey finances were never on an entirely secure footing. Privations became part of the monks' daily routine. Indebtedness was compounded by natural and political catastrophes. There was a destructive fire in the winter of 1502/03. The abbey was torched again in 1577 after being pillaged by French soldiers participating in the religious wars of the period. There was a third destructive fire at the start of the 17th century. On several occasions during the three centuries prior to 1782 plans were drawn up at Cîteaux Abbey (the Cistercian mother house) to decree the closure of Nizelles: nevertheless each time the place was burned down it somehow proved possible sufficiently to rebuild or restore the abbey.

The opening years of the 17th century found the abbey in a condition of particular ruin and devastation. It was saved by Cambron Abbey. On 4 December 1601 Robert d’Ostelart, abbot of Cambron, sent over three of his monks, including one named Jean d’Assignies, to re-establish Nizelles. The Nizelles annals of the time record that initially they had to eat their meals standing up, and because there was no table they had to turn over the barrel in which they had brought over some provisions from Cambron and eat their meals off that. In 1602 the three monks at Nizelles were joined by Bernard de Montgaillard who was sent by the chapter at Cîteaux to serve as abbot. Personally austere, and experienced as a monk, Bernard proved an energetic administrator: born in 1562, by the time he came to Nizelles he was already well known to the secular authorities locally. He obtained for the abbey the protection of Archduke Albert, then governor of the Spanish Netherlands (approximately modern-day Belgium) and of Albert's duchess, Isabella. As abbot, Bernard contributed much to restoring the fortunes of Nizelles, although the abbey never returned to its 1442 prosperity. The rebuilding he instigated came to an abrupt halt in 1605 when the Cistercian authorities redeployed him to Orval Abbey.

Eighty years later Nizelles was nevertheless evidently still worth fighting over. A dispute arose as to whether it was still a daughter house of Moulins-Warnant, based on the situation in 1442 when it was founded, or whether it was now a daughter house of Cambron, which had picked up the pieces at the beginning of the 17th century. In 1682 the dispute was settled in favour of Moulins-Warnant.

== Eighteenth century: decline and closure ==
During the 18th century Nizelles underwent a succession of internal conflicts. Relations were strained between abbots (some of whom held their positions only on a commendatory basis) and the monastic community. The monks complained about the lifestyles and administrative approaches of their abbots and the abbots complained about the insubordination of the monks:

- Guillaume Fortamps, the 22nd abbot, was imposed on the monks. He was suspected of Jansenism.
- Under Pierre Van Hamme and Antoine Ghiselin, the 23rd and 24th abbots, discipline became famously lax and devotional studies were neglected. Ghiselin was forced to resign in 1771 and left the abbey: it is possible that he was expelled. In 1765 there were only 15 monks at Nizelles
- Placide Desellis was the 25th and final abbot. He restored order to the abbey finances. Importantly, he wrote and bequeathed a chronicle of the abbey covering the entire period 1439 - 1779, entitled: "The Annals of Nizelles Abbey".

The decree of 18 March 1783 by which Joseph II, the archetypal enlightened despot, closed down monasteries identified as "unnecessary", was the death knell for the abbey at Nizelles. The abbey was deconstructed and divided into two farms (Upper Nizelles farm and Lower Nizelles farm), one of which occupied the monastic buildings.

In 1787 monks returned to Nizelles during the Brabant Revolution when the Habsburgs were briefly removed from power in the Southern Netherlands, but the return of monks to Nizelles and (at this stage) the removal of the Habsburgs proved temporary. With the impact of the French Revolution, one of the monastic farms was sold. The abbey church was converted for use as a grain store: it was later largely destroyed by fire, in 1845.

== Secular resurrection ==
The abbey ruins were acquired by the Count Éric d'Humilly de Chevilly in December 1999. He restored the old buildings which became the focus of a private business. The abbey is currently available to be hired out for family celebrations and corporate events.
