= Chimay Abbey =

Abbey in Chimay, Hainaut, Belgium

Coordinates: 50°02′59″N 4°18′29″E

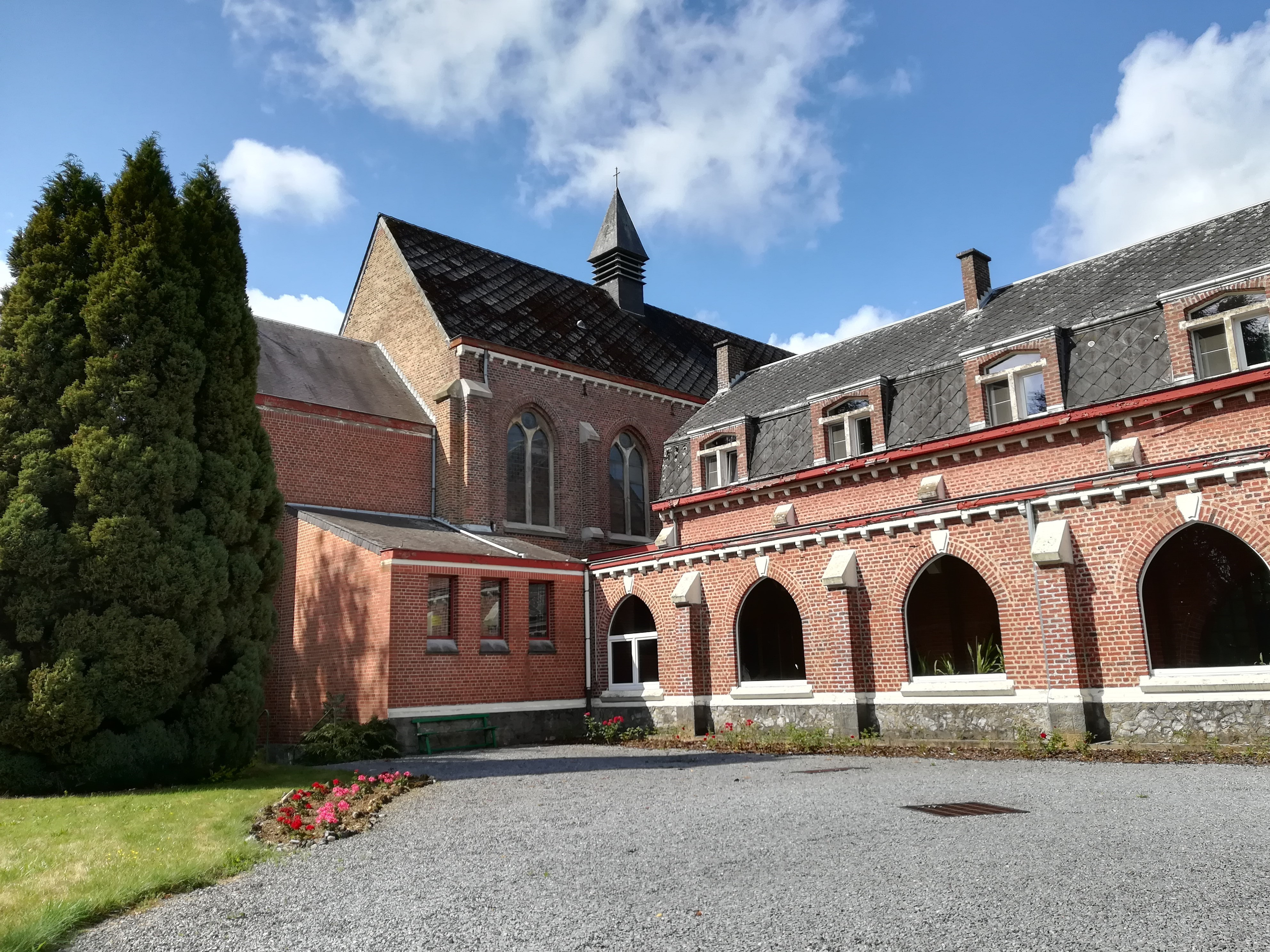
Chimay, abbaye Notre-Dame de la Paix

Chimay Abbey (French: Abbaye de Chimay) is an abbey in Wallonia in the city of Chimay, Hainaut, Belgium.

It has been the name of two or three different religious houses.

== Benedictines ==
The oldest foundation here, in the 9th century, was a Benedictine monastery, Chimay Abbey or St. Monegonde's Abbey (Abbaye de Ste. Monégonde de Chimay). This later became a collegiate foundation dedicated to Saints Peter and Paul. The monastery is long gone, but the church still stands in the centre of Chimay as the town's parish church.

== Trappists ==
In 1919 a convent of Trappist nuns, Chimay Abbey or Abbey of Our Lady of Peace (Abbaye de Notre-Dame de la Paix de Chimay) was established here.

The community, Trappist since 1878, was the successor to the Cistercian community of Gomerfontaine, founded in 1207, suppressed in 1792 and re-established in 1802 at Saint-Paul-aux-Bois. It was exiled to Fourbechies in 1904, before coming to Chimay after World War I under the protection of the Trappist monastery, Scourmont Abbey, established at Scourmont in Chimay in 1850.

== Sources ==
- History of the Trappist nuns at Chimay (in French)
- Scourmont Abbey website
- Belgium Beer Tour
