= Bethlehem Abbey, Bonheiden =

Bethlehem Abbey
- Abdij Bethlehem
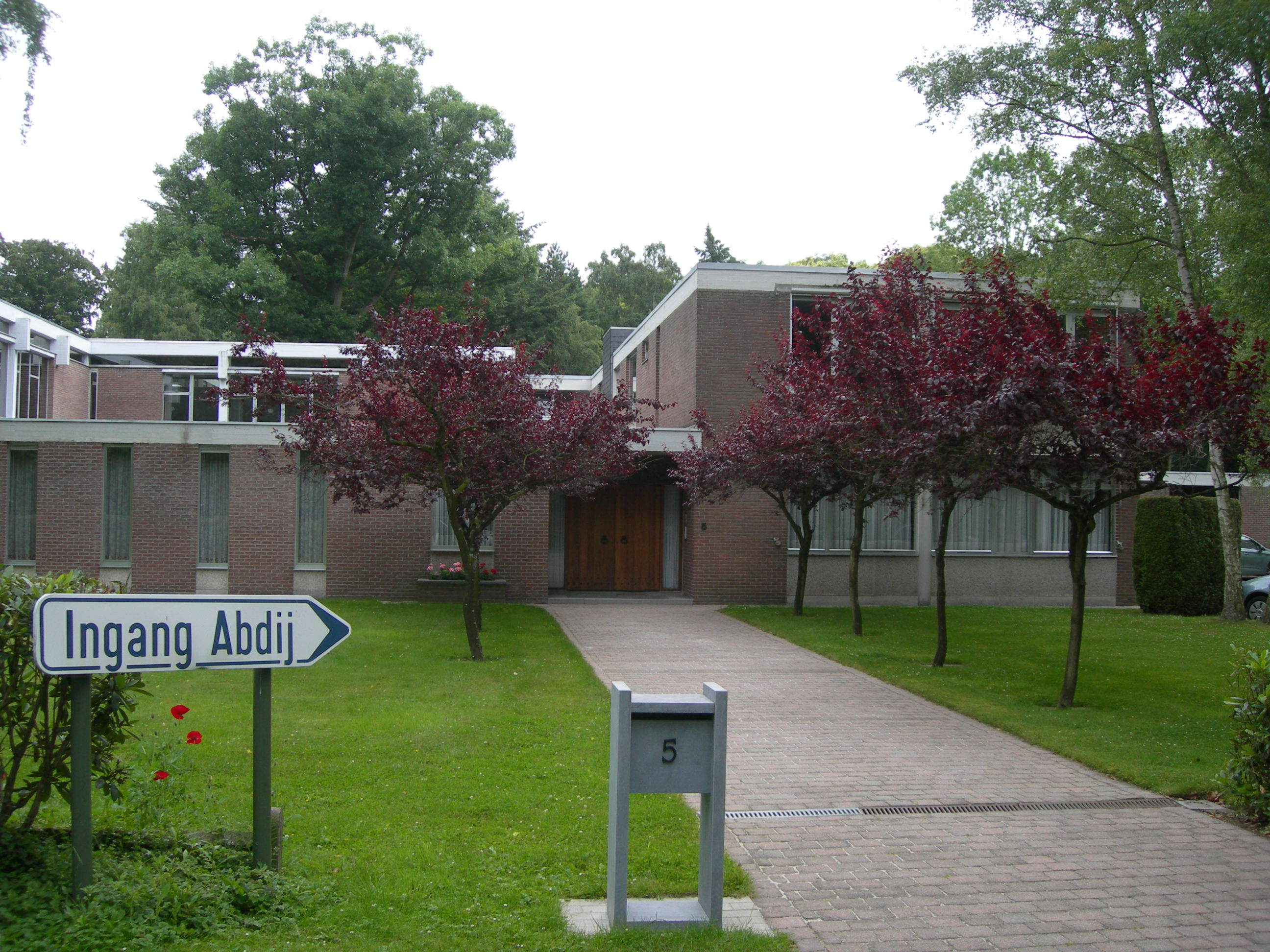

- Location within Belgium
- Interactive map of Bethlehem Abbey

Monastery information
- Order: Order of Saint Benedict
- Established: 1975

Architecture
- Functional status: monastery
- Completion date: 1965

Site
- Coordinates: 51.02°N 4.55°E
- Website: www.monasteria.org/Nederlands/Abdij%20Bethlehem.htm

Bethlehem Abbey in the village of Bonheiden, Belgium, is a house of Benedictine nuns of the Subiaco Cassinese Congregation. The monastery was built in 1965 as a Redemptorist house but was transferred to the Benedictines in 1975.

The community formerly ran a publishing imprint which produced Dutch translations of the writings of Basil of Caesarea and Athanasius of Alexandria.

Since 30 May 2015 the Benedictines have shared the monastery buildings with a lay community (the Moriya Community).
