= Eekhout Abbey =

Medieval house in West Flanders, Belgium

Coordinates: 51°12′18.73″N 3°13′46.28″E

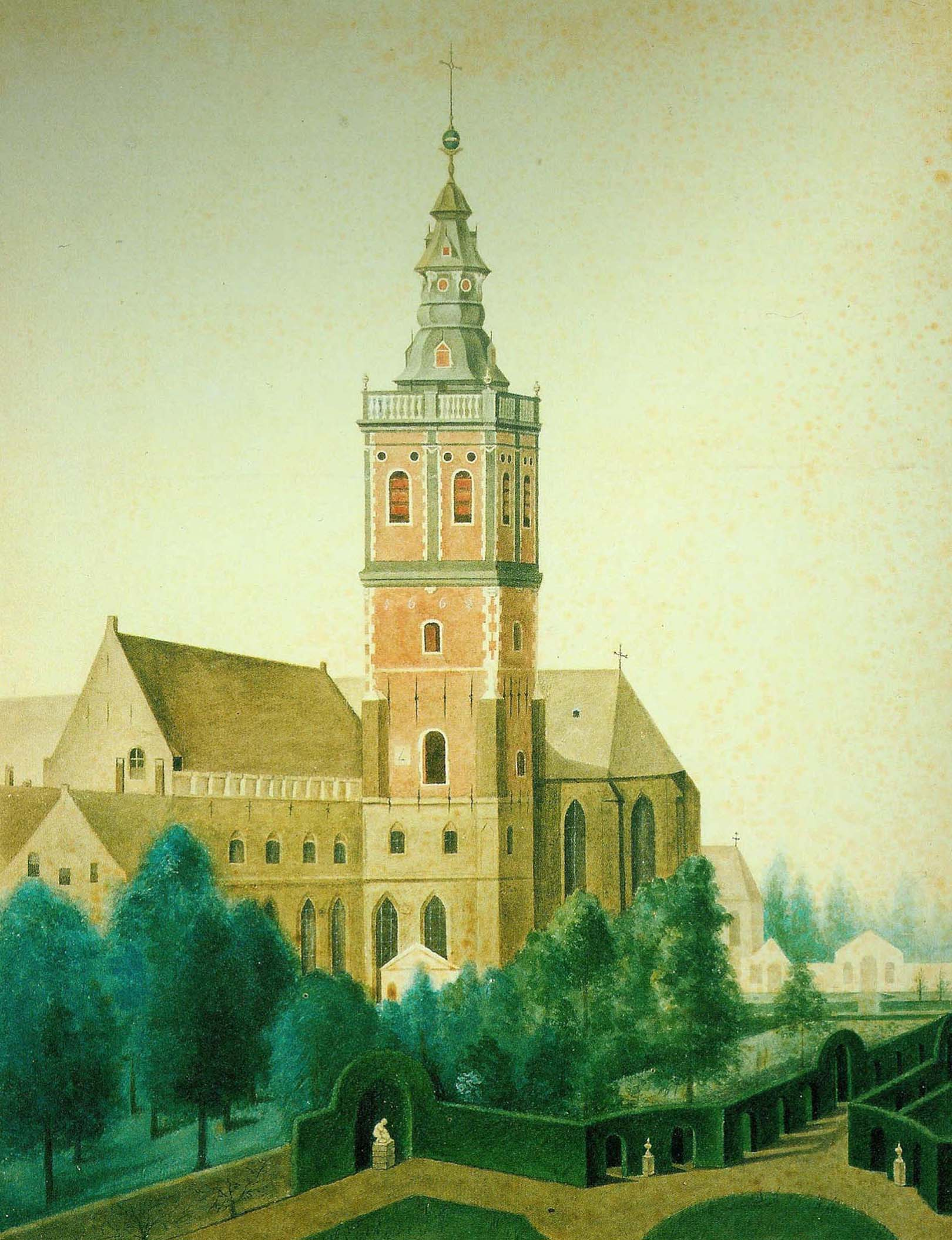
Eekhout Abbey shortly before demolition

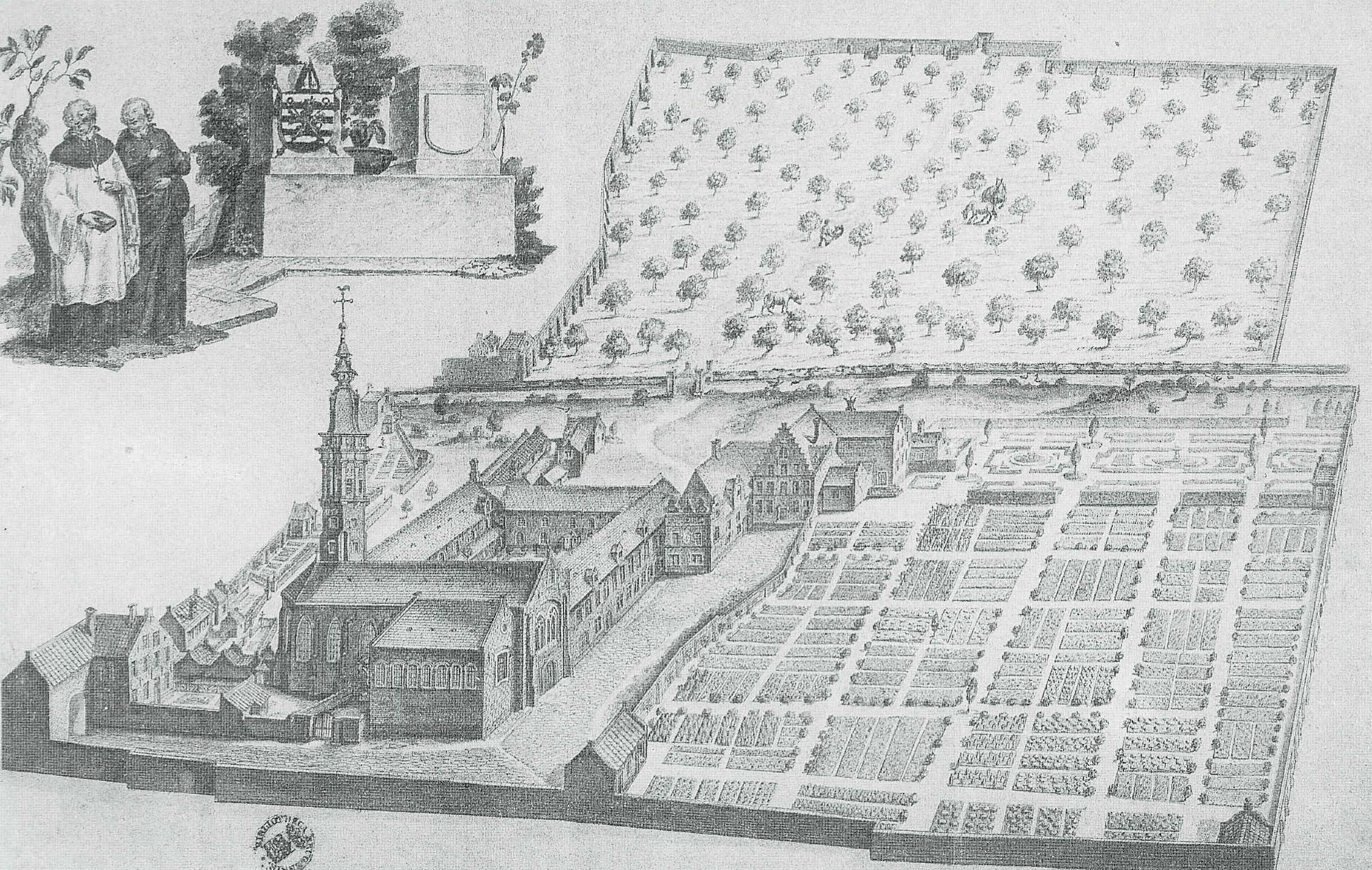
General view, 18th century (the door onto the Eekhoutstraat, the only part of the building which still survives, is to the left)

Eekhout Abbey (Dutch: Eekhoutabdij) was a medieval house of Augustinian Canons in Bruges, West Flanders, Belgium.

== History ==
The origin of the abbey, dedicated to Saint Bartholomew, was traditionally linked to the religious community that had grown up round the cell of the hermit Everelmus in about 1050, although the first reference dates only from 1130.

In or around 1146 it joined the Arrouaisian Order, and in consequence adopted the Rule of St. Augustine and became an abbey, under the first abbot, Lambertus. The men's and women's communities which had previously coexisted here were separated: the women were moved to premises in Odegem (now Steenbrugge) where their community developed into St. Trudo's Abbey (still extant and housed since 1954 in Male Castle), while the men remained on the existing site near the centre of Bruges.

After centuries of decline, the abbey was dissolved in the French Revolution.

== Dispersal ==
In 1803, after being sold off as state property, the abbey was entirely demolished by its French purchaser Rousseau, except for a single doorway onto the Eekhoutstraat, which still stands. Isolated plots which were connected to their property in the Garenmarkt came into the hands of the Du Jardin family. After the failure of their family business, the Bank Du Jardin, in 1874 a large part of their property here came into the possession of the Sisters of the Sint-Andreasinstituut, who had a school built on it. The site of the former abbey is now occupied by the Groeningemuseum.
