= Male, Belgium =

Quarter of the city of Bruges, Belgium

Male
- Quarter of Bruges
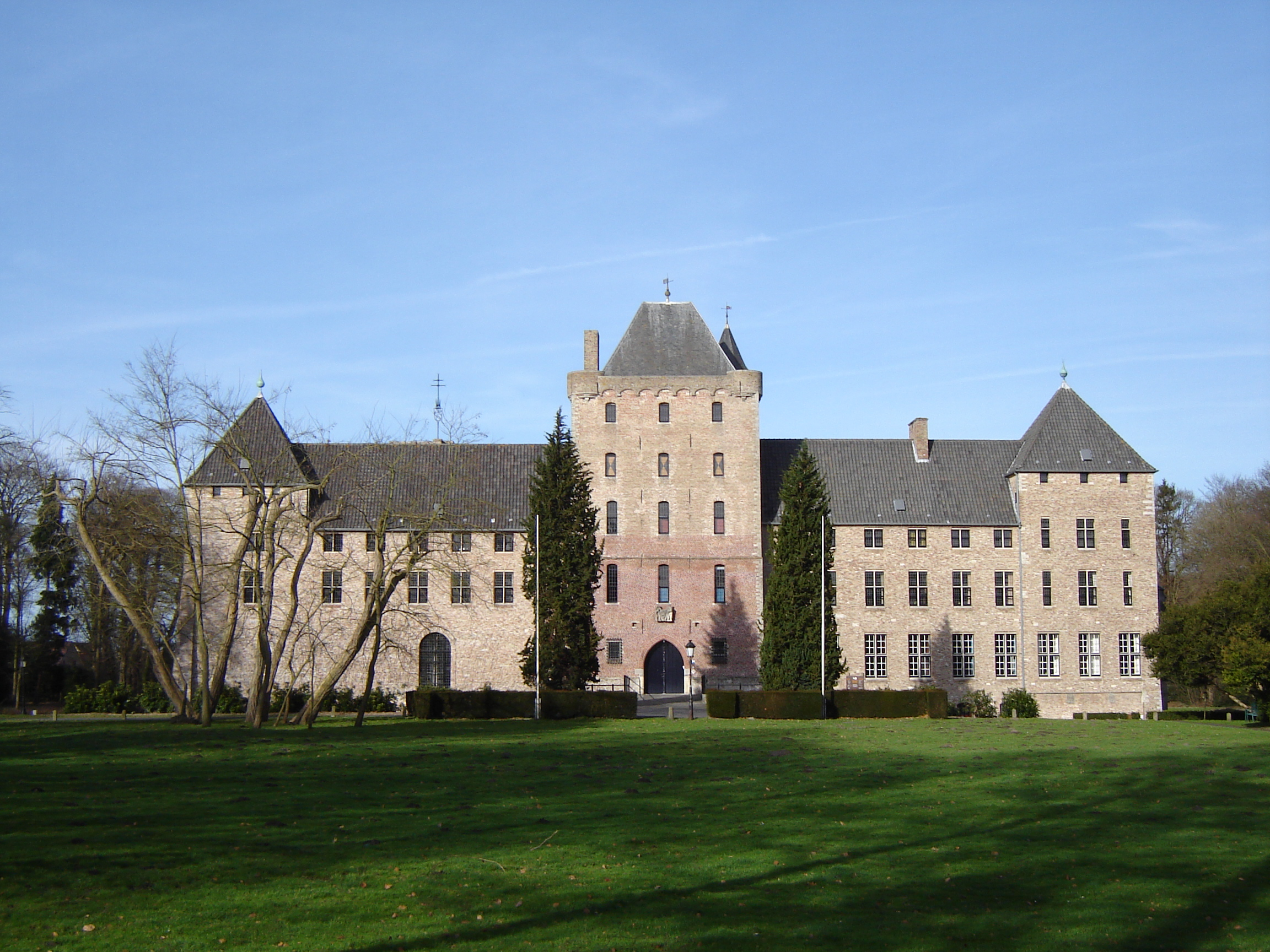
- Sint Trudo abbey in Male

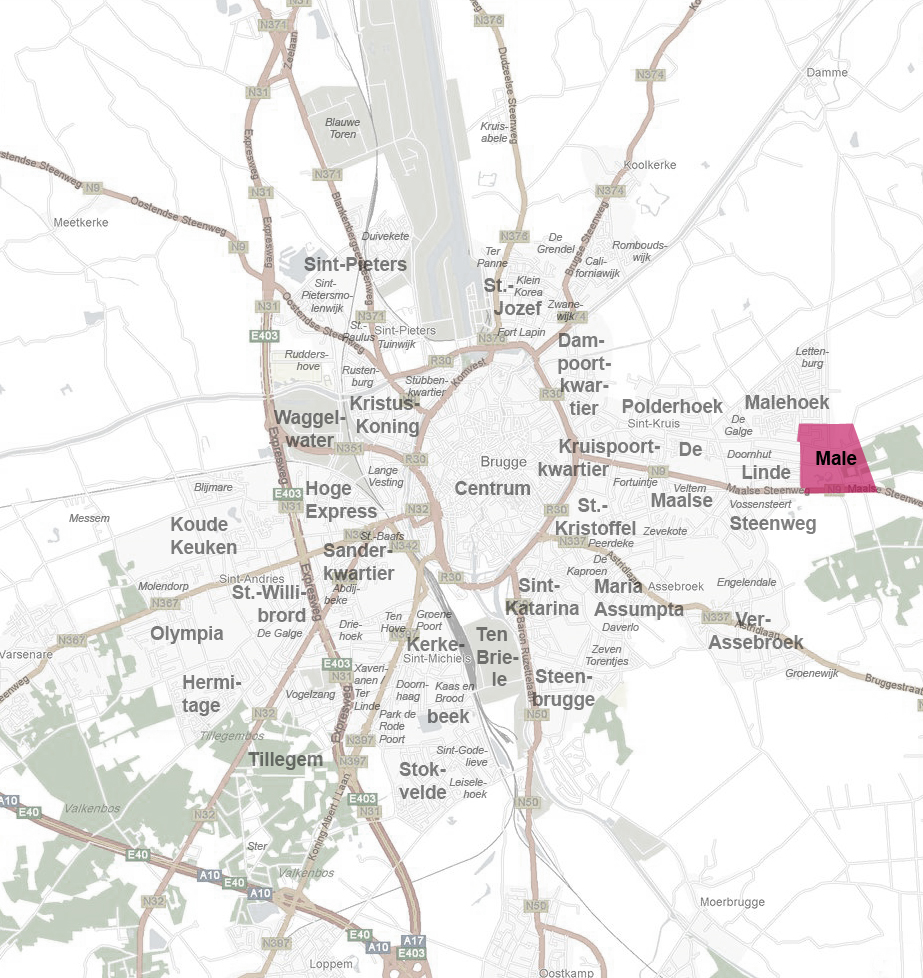
- Location of Male in Bruges
- Interactive map of Male
- Location within Belgium Location within West Flanders
- Coordinates: 51°12′36″N 3°16′59″E
- Country: Belgium
- Community: Flemish Community
- Region: Flemish Region
- Province: West Flanders
- Arrondissement: Bruges
- Municipality: Bruges
- Postal codes: 8310
- Area codes: 050

Male (Dutch pronunciation: [ˈmaːlə]) is a former hamlet and today a quarter in the east of Sint-Kruis, a sub-municipality of Bruges, West Flanders, Belgium. The hamlet, which retains its small historic center, clusters around Male Castle, best known as the birthplace of Louis, count of Flanders in 1329.
