= Maele Castle =

Castle in Belgium

Coordinates: 51.2091°N 3.2888°E

Maele Castle (Dutch: Grafelijk Slot van Male) is a former castle in Male, once a separate village, now part of Sint-Kruis, a suburb of Bruges, West Flanders, Belgium. The buildings, almost entirely rebuilt and restored after the destruction of World War II, have housed St. Trudo's Abbey (Sint-Trudoabdij) from 1954 until 2011.

== History ==
The castle's origins date back to the 9th century, as a defensive tower for protection of the territory around Bruges against the Vikings. Male was held by Philip of Alsace, Count of Flanders, between 1168 and 1191, who replaced the wooden structure with one built of stone, which included a chapel consecrated by the exiled archbishop of Canterbury, Thomas Becket, in 1166.

The castle was a residence of the Counts of Flanders (in 1330 it was the birthplace of Count Louis II, sometimes known as Louis of Male) but was also a stronghold in a much-disputed terrain. French forces occupied it. The city of Bruges retook it from its French garrison in the uprising of 1302. Soldiers from Ghent razed it in 1382 and after it had been rebuilt, ransacked it again in 1453. In 1473 it was burnt out and once again rebuilt: the present keep dates from that rebuilding, and stands with its foundations directly in the moat, now flanked by symmetrical wings. The castle was plundered yet again in 1490 by the forces of the Count of Nassau.

When Flanders became a part of the Burgundian Netherlands Male retained its importance. During the Spanish occupation of the Low Countries, the citadel was sold in 1558 by Philip II to Juan Lopez Gallo.

It was occupied by German troops in both world wars, and was severely damaged.

On the 29th and 30th September 1962, representatives of the 'Campaign for Amnesty 1961' from several countries around the world met at Maele Castle and decided to change the name of Amnesty to Amnesty International. The stated purpose of the change was "to emphasise the world-wide basis of the movement's work and to differentiate it from the various 'amnesty campaigns' organised in respect of individual countries, usually by supporters of a political party formerly in power."

The castle is now the property of the Deprez family.

== Present day ==
The castle was comprehensively restored after World War II and since 1954 has accommodated St. Trudo's Abbey, a house of the Canonesses Regular of the Holy Sepulchre.

== See also ==
- List of castles in Belgium
