= Brialmont Abbey =

Abbey in Belgium

- Abbaye Notre-Dame de Brialmont
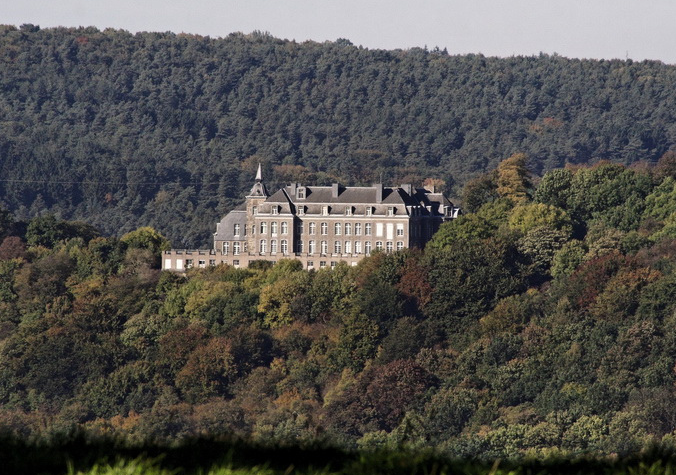
- Interactive map of Brialmont Abbey

Monastery information
- Order: Cistercian (to 1975); Trappist
- Established: 1961
- Disestablished: 2026
- Dedication: Blessed Virgin Mary
- Archdiocese: Mechelen-Brussels
- Diocese: Diocese of Liège

Site
- Coordinates: 50.557°N 5.583°E
- Website: https://www.brialmont.be/

Brialmont Abbey (in French: Abbaye Notre-Dame de Brialmont), formerly Brialmont Castle, at Tilff in the commune of Esneux, Province of Liège, Belgium, was from 1961 to 2026 the home of a monastic community.

== History ==
The monastery was founded at Sorée (Province of Namur) in 1934, as a community of Cistercian nuns, living according to the Rule of St Benedict, and was officially affiliated to the Cistercian Order in 1940. In 1956 one of the nuns, Monique d'Otreppe de Bouvette (born 1912), inherited the Brialmont estate in Tilff, which had first been established in the 13th century by Eustache de Hamal (died 1282). On 5 August 1961 the community, then numbering 22 nuns, moved to Brialmont Castle, which became an abbey. In 1975, the abbey was affiliated to the Trappist Order. The abbey church was consecrated in 1981, and visited by Pope John-Paul II during his visit to Belgium in 1985.

The nuns became known for organic mushroom farming. On 25 July 2026, a thanksgiving mass was celebrated to mark the decision to disband the monastic community, which had shrunk to six active members.
