= Mont Cornillon Abbey =

Premonstratensian monastery in Belgium

Coordinates: 50°38′03″N 5°34′14″E

Mont Cornillon Abbey (L'Abbaye du Mont-Cornillon in French) was a Premonstratensian monastery which occupied a site in Wallonia close to Liège, Belgium. In 1288 the abbey having moved to a new location, it became known as Beaurepart Abbey. It was the home of Saint Juliana of Liège.

== History ==
The abbey was founded by Albero I of Louvain, Bishop of Liège, in 1124, three years after Saint Norbert had formed the Premonstratensian Order. The abbey, intended for Canons Regular of Prémontré from Floreffe Abbey near Namur, stood on the right bank of the Meuse on an elevation called Mont Cornillon which overlooked the city of Liège.

In the early years of the order all Premonstratensian abbeys were double abbeys, that is to say, the canons lived on one side of the church and the nuns, who had charge of the hospital for women, on the other side. Where an abbey stood on an elevation, as was the case at Mont Cornillon, both the nunnery and the hospital were built at the foot of the hill. Saint Juliana of Liège (born 1193; died 1258), whose name is connected with the institution of the feast of Corpus Christi on account of her visions, was a nun of this convent.

The first abbot of Mont Cornillon was Blessed Lucas, one of Saint Norbert's disciples, a learned and holy religious, some of whose writings have been published in the "Bibliotheca Magna Patrum", and also by Migne.

The Bishop of Liège, wishing to build a fortress on the heights of Cornillon, gave the canons in exchange in 1288 another site in his episcopal city where the abbey, from that time on called Beaurepart Abbey ("Bellus Reditus"), stood until it was suppressed by the French Republic in 1796.

All the religious refused to take the oath of allegiance to the Republic; some were exiled and one was put to death. The abbey was declared to be of public utility and consequently was not sold. For a time it served as an arsenal and for other government purposes, but by decree of 11 June 1809, Napoleon gave the abbey to the Bishop of Liège as his residence and as the Diocesan Seminary of Liège.

On the abbey's original site on Mont Cornillon the Little Sisters of the Poor have built an old people's home, and the former nunnery at the foot of the hill is now occupied by Carmelite nuns.
