= Everelmus =

Everelmus (died 2 October 1060) was a hermit in the vicinity of Bruges. His hermitage, on an island in the river Reie, lay at the basis of the later Eekhout Abbey.

Very little is known about him. He seems to have built a chapel to St Bartholomew near his hermitage, which might indicate that he had been on a pilgrimage to Rome, where St Bartholomew was venerated in a church on an island in the Tiber. A community is attested on the site around 1100, and the abbey of Eekhout, dedicated to St Bartholomew, by 1130. An epitaph to Everelmus, stating that he was buried in the church, survived in the church of St Bartholomew until the French Revolution.
