= Braine-le-Château =

Municipality in Walloon Brabant province, Wallonia, Belgium

Braine-le-Château Brinne-Tchestea (Walloon): Kasteelbrakel (Dutch)
- Municipality
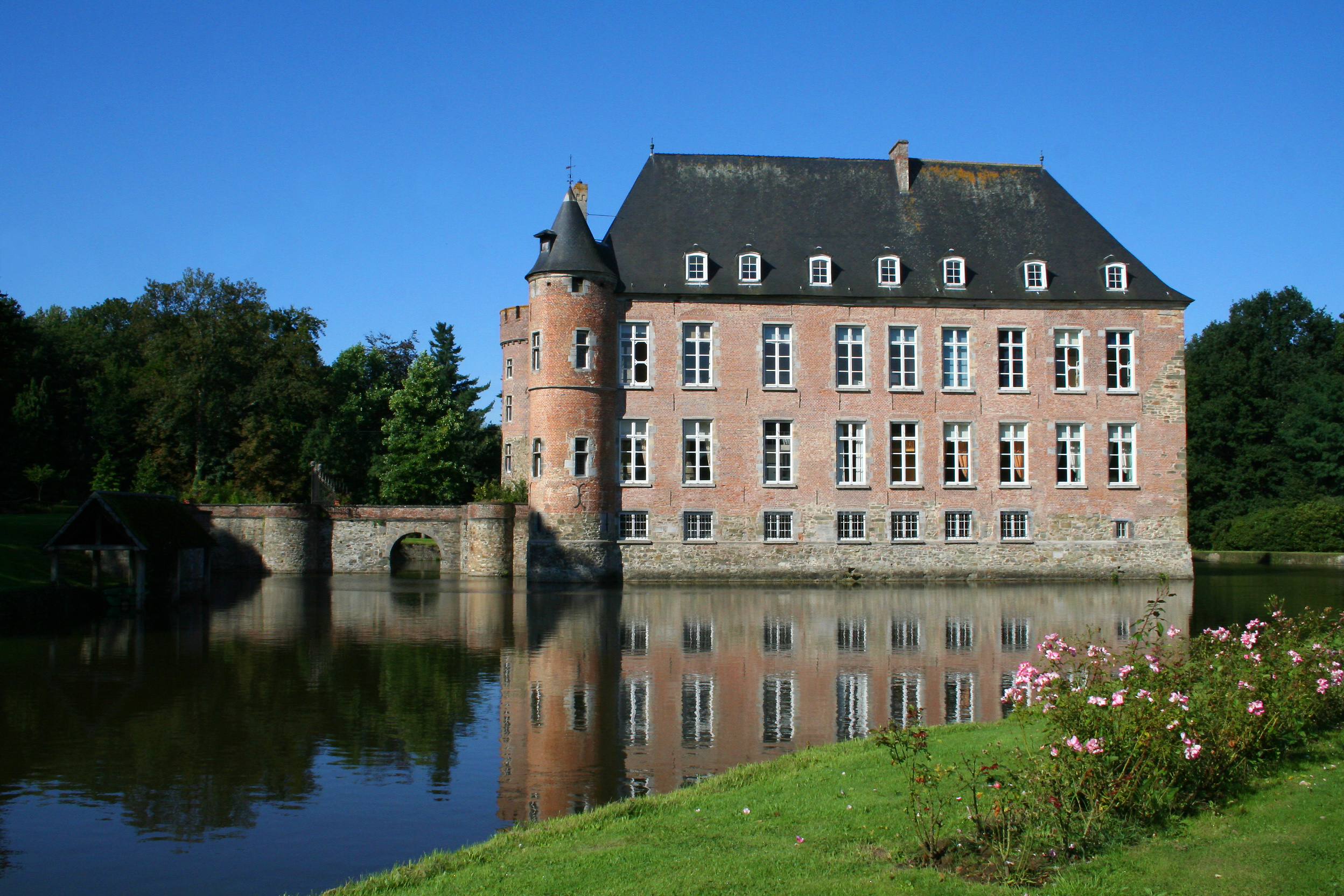
- Braine-le-Château: the castle

- Flag Coat of arms

- The municipality of Braine-le-Château in Walloon Brabant
- Interactive map of Braine-le-Château
- Location in Belgium
- Coordinates: 50°41′N 04°16′E
- Country: Belgium
- Community: French Community
- Region: Wallonia
- Province: Walloon Brabant
- Arrondissement: Nivelles

Government
  - Mayor: Nicolas Tamigniau (RB)
  - Governing party: Renouveau Brainois (RB)

Area
  - Total: 22.75 km^{2} (8.78 sq mi)

Population (2018-01-01)
  - Total: 10,447
  - Density: 459.2/km^{2} (1,189/sq mi)
- Postal codes: 1440
- NIS code: 25015
- Area codes: 02
- Website: www.braine-le-chateau.be

Braine-le-Château (French: [bʁɛn lə ʃɑto]; Walloon: Brinne-Tchestea; Dutch: Kasteelbrakel [kɑˈsteːlˌbraːkəl]) is a municipality of Wallonia located in the Belgian province of Walloon Brabant.

On January 1, 2006, Braine-le-Château had a total population of 9,446. The total area is 22.70 km² which gives a population density of 416 inhabitants per km².

The municipality consists of the following districts: Braine-le-Château and Wauthier-Braine, which were municipalities of their own until 1977.

Braine-le-Château is a medieval village in which many buildings from the Middle Ages remain. Among them are the pillory (1521), the village mill (c. 1200) and the Maison du Bailli (c. 1535).

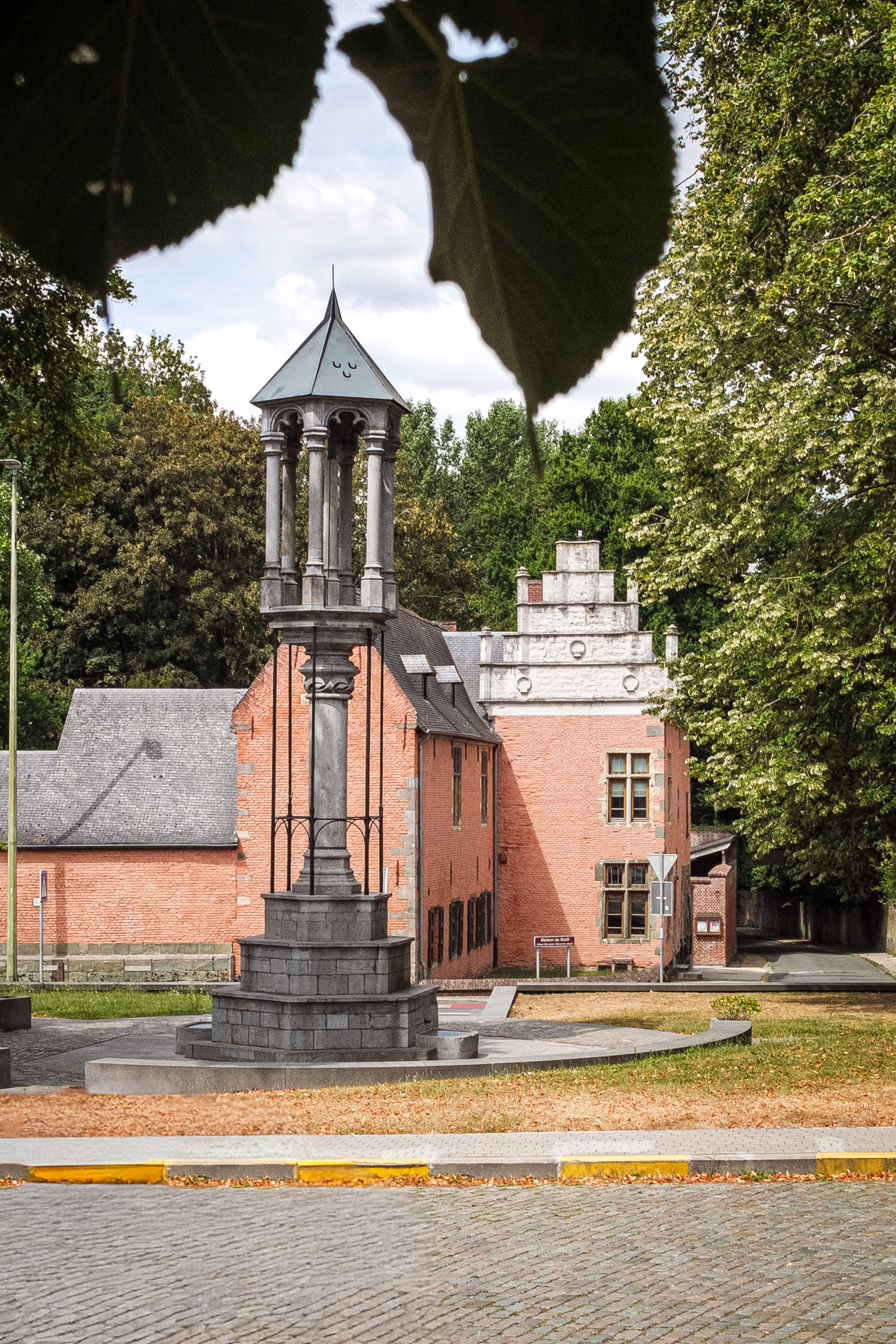
The pillory and the Bailli House

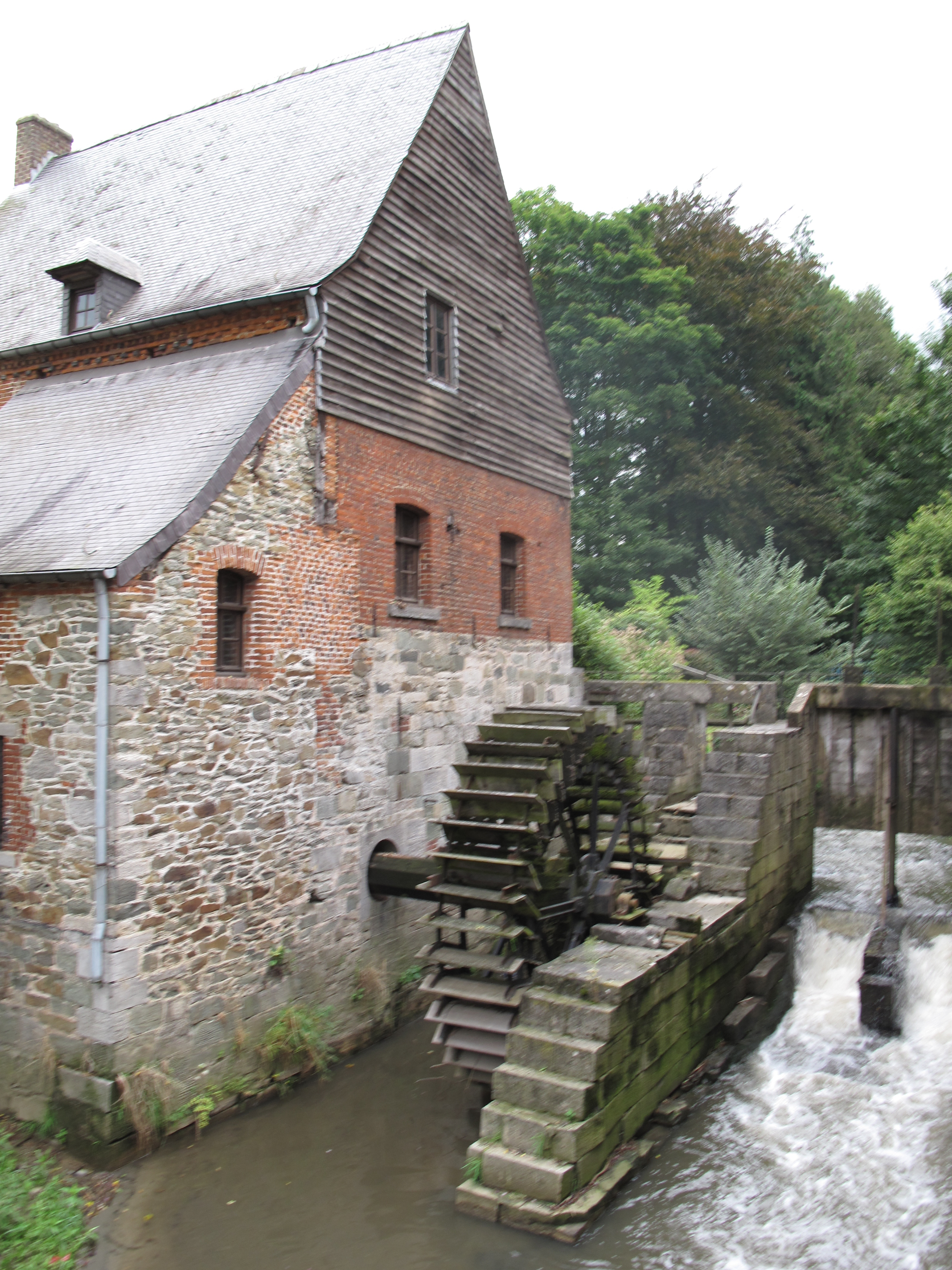
Moulin banal (mill)

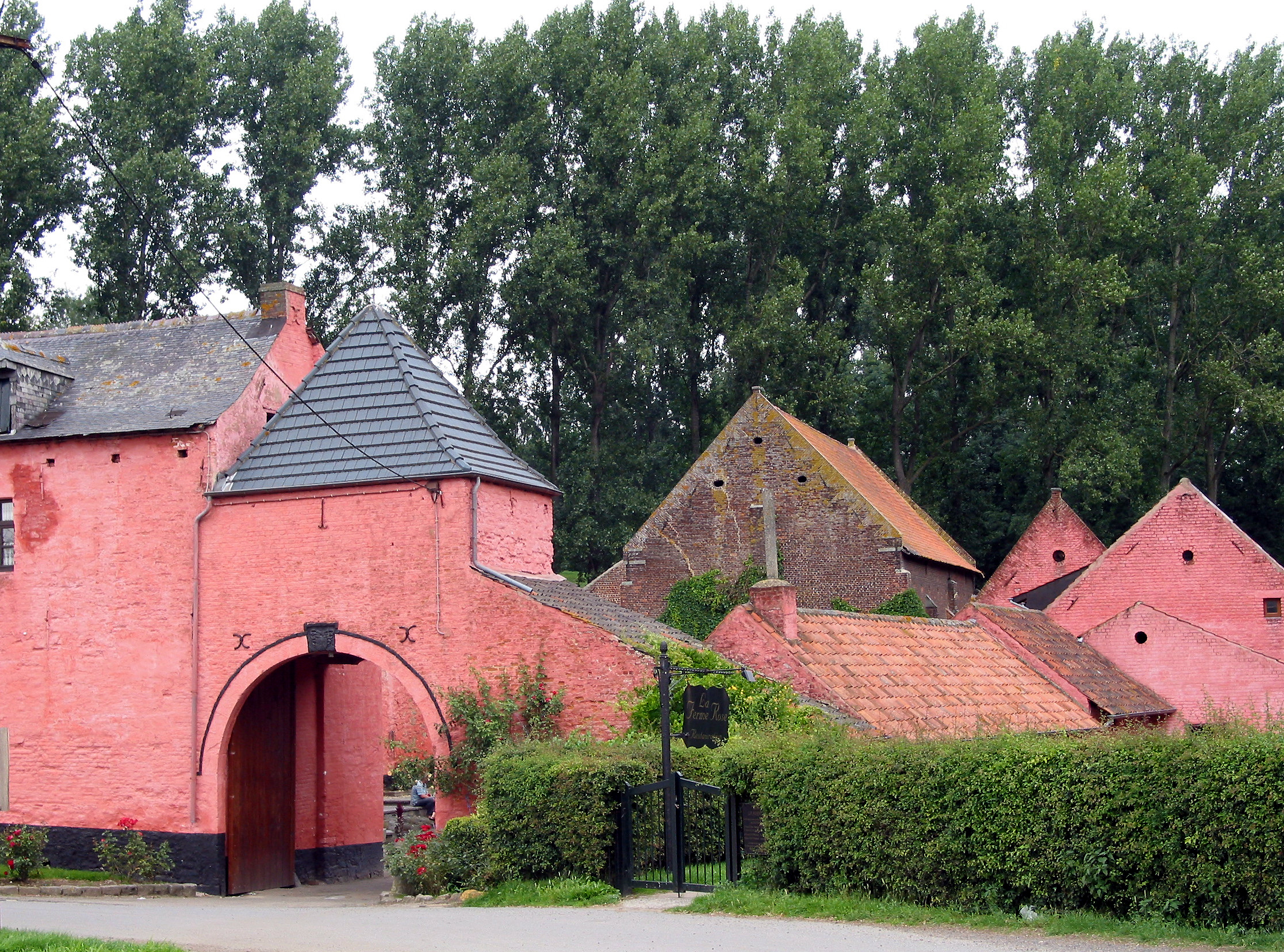
The Binchfort farm (16th century)
