= Sint-Kruis =

Sub-municipality of the city of Bruges, Belgium

- Sub-municipality of Bruges
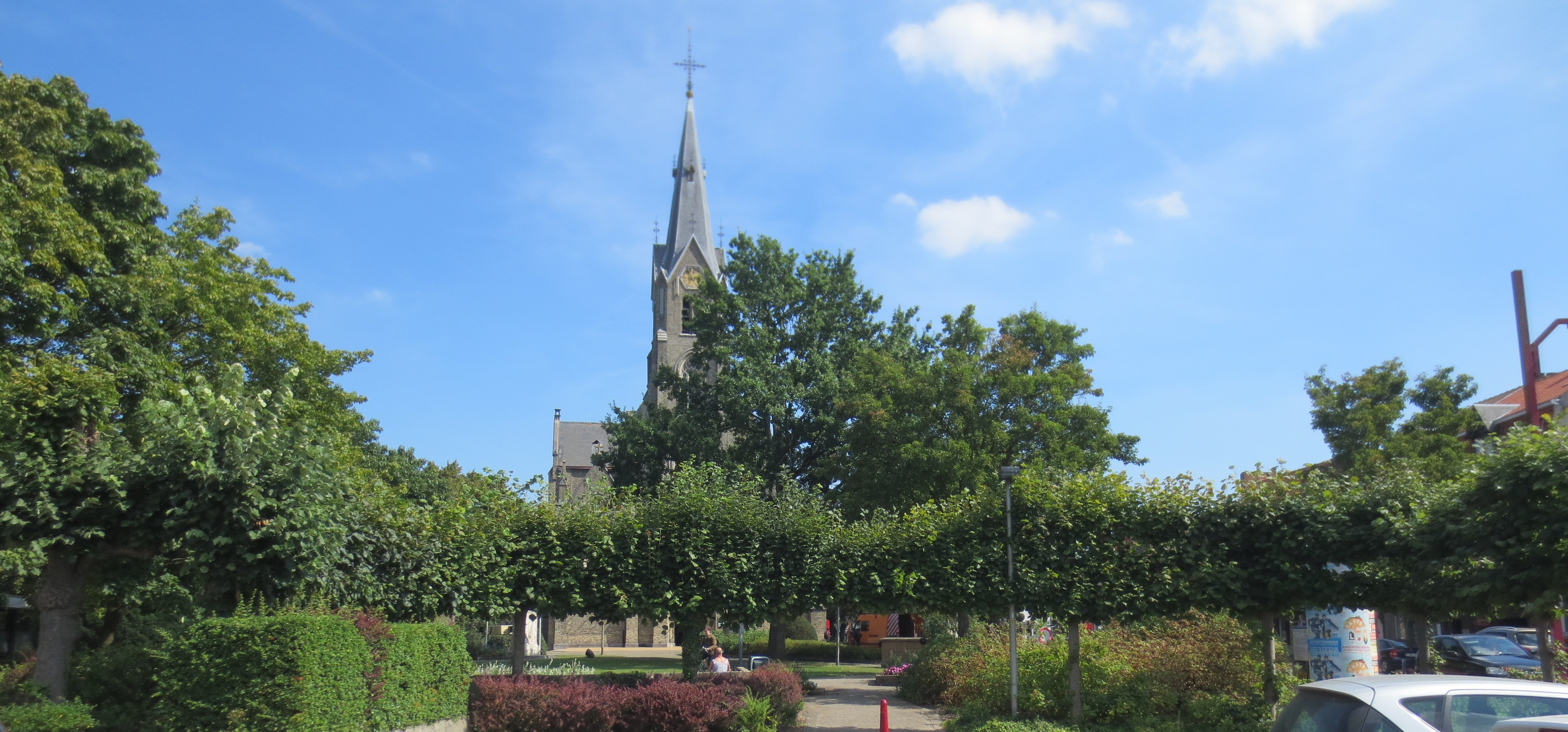
- Panoramic view of Sint-Kruis

- Coat of arms
- Interactive map of Sint-Kruis
- Location within Belgium Location within West Flanders
- Coordinates: 51°12′50″N 3°15′01″E
- Country: Belgium
- Community: Flemish Community
- Region: Flemish Region
- Province: West Flanders
- Arrondissement: Bruges
- Municipality: Bruges

Area
  - Total: 13.75 km^{2} (5.31 sq mi)

Population (2014-12-31)
  - Total: 15,892
  - Density: 1,156/km^{2} (2,993/sq mi)
- Postal codes: 8310
- Area codes: 050

Sint-Kruis (Dutch: [sɪnt ˈkrœys]; West Flemish: Sinte-Kruus) is a sub-municipality of the city of Bruges located in the province of West Flanders, Flemish Region, Belgium. It was a separate municipality until 1971. On 1 January 1971, it was merged into Bruges.

== Gallery ==
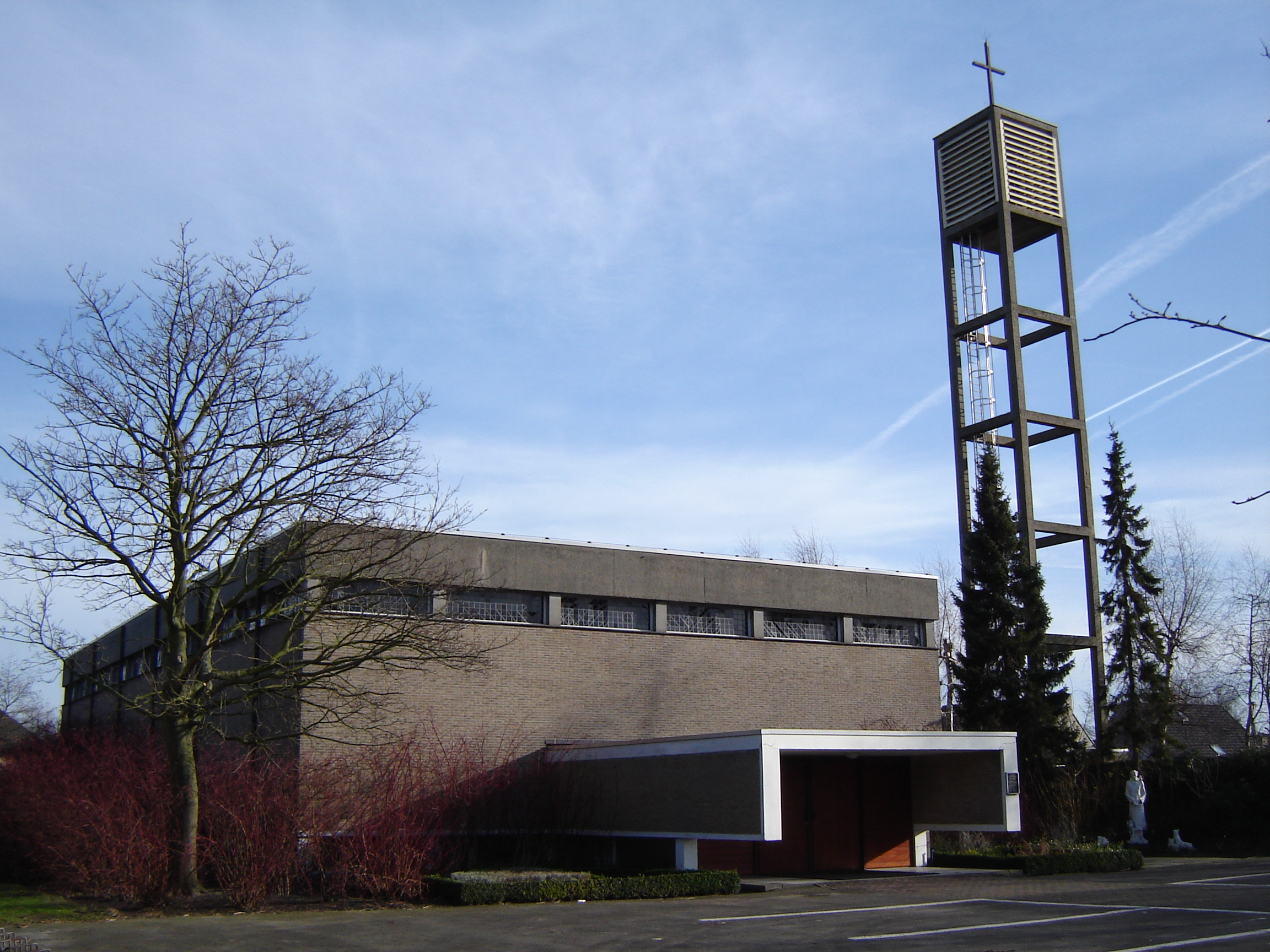
Church of Saint Francis of Assisi

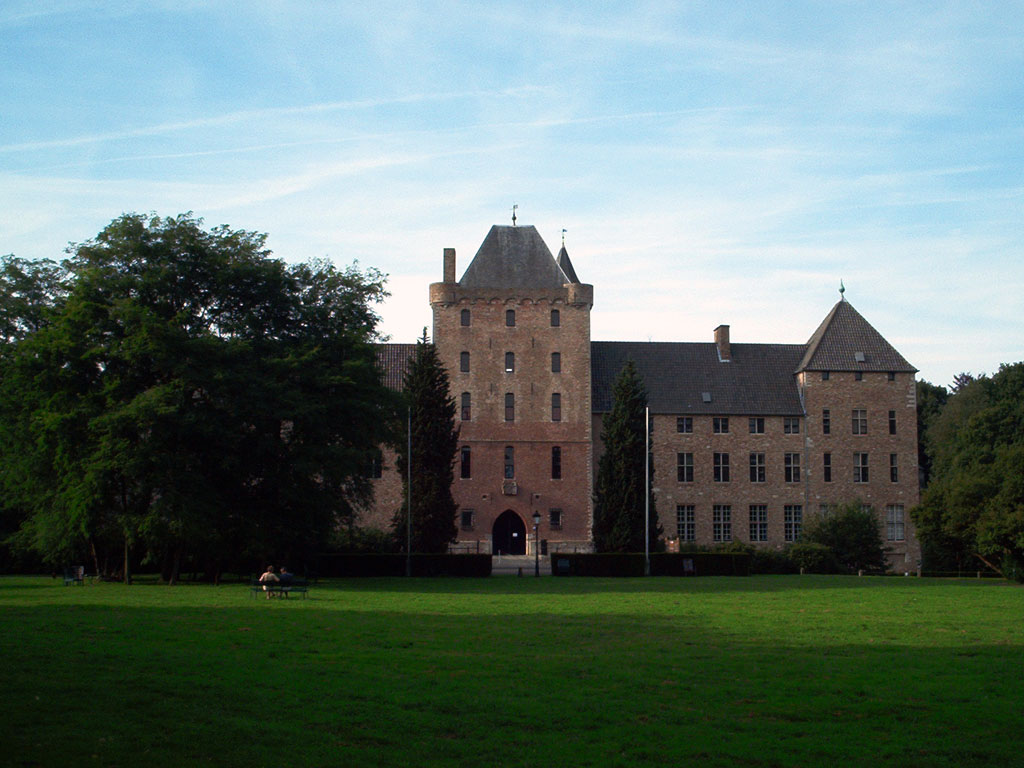
Male Castle
