= Abbey of Onze-Lieve-Vrouw ter Nieuwe Plant =

Coordinates: 50.8526°N 2.8871°E

The Abbey of Onze-Lieve-Vrouw ter Nieuwe Plant ("Our Lady of the New Plantation"; Latin: Nova Plantatio Beatae Mariae Virginis), formerly also Roesbrugge Abbey (Dutch: Abdij van Roesbrugge) is a community of Augustinian canonesses belonging to the Congregation of Windesheim. The sisters are informally known as the Roesbrugge Dames - the Roesbrugge Ladies. Located in Roesbrugge from 1239 to the late 16th century, the community then moved into Ypres, West Flanders, Belgium, where it exists today. Its adjacent school is the Lyceum Onze Lieve Vrouw ter Nieuwe Plant.

== History ==
The abbey was founded in 1239 at Roesbrugge by Willem van Bethune and his wife Elisabeth van Roesbrugge for the Canonesses Regular of St. Victor of Prémy Abbey near Cambrai. They are believed to have opened a school.

The abbey thrived, but in 1572 began the troubles of the Eighty Years' War. Marauding Calvinist soldiers made Roesbrugge uninhabitable for the community. Some of them sought refuge in Ypres, others in St. Omer. The abbey was pillaged by the Calvinists and subsequently laid waste by Spanish troops.

Once the County of Flanders was again in the hands of the King of Spain, the sisters in St. Omer returned. The Council of Trent recommended that monasteries should re-settle in or near towns, and the community from Roesbrugge decided to settle permanently in Ypres. They began once again to provide schooling, but more incidents of war caused them further setbacks.

In 1744 the abbey was destroyed by the troops of Louis XV, King of France, during the War of the Austrian Succession. Reconstruction began in 1778 and in 1782 the abbey was reopened. Yet again war intervened, this time between Austria and France in the French Revolution. For this reason, in 1793 a new abbess was not elected, only a prioress. In 1798 the abbey was seized by the French and sold. The sisters were dispersed, but after the Concordat of 1801 between Napoleon and Pope Pius VII were able to buy back a piece of ground immediately adjacent to the site of the former abbey, and began their work again, including the management of a boarding school.

World War I forced the sisters to flee on 31 October 1914 and to take refuge in England. They moved to France in July 1915, where they helped Belgian students. When in February 1919 they returned to Ypres, everything was destroyed. In 1921 re-building began, to designs by the architect Camille Damman, and the abbey and its school have functioned since that time.

In 1967 the sisters, together with the canonesses of Bruges, founded St. Agnes' Abbey in Sion, Switzerland, which lasted until 1994.

== Bibliography ==
- Hoste, D Anselm OSB, 1986: De abdij O.L.Vrouw Ter-Nieuwe-Plant. 1236 - 1986 Roesbrugge Dames Ypres: publisher unknown
- Verheede, Sister Marie Angèle, 1783: Annales de l'abbaye de Notre-Dame de la Nouvelle Plante. Ypres
- Quartier, P., Zwaenepoel, M.-C., Yperman, J.: Glasramen uit de kapel van het lyceum Onze-Lieve-Vrouw-ter-Nieuwe-Plant nu in de Ieperse Sint-Maartenskerk in Gidsenkroniek Westland, Jrg. 51 (2014) Nr. 3
