= Ophain-Bois-Seigneur-Isaac =

Village in Brabant, Wallonia, Belgium

Coordinates: 50°40′N 4°21′E

Ophain-Bois-Seigneur-Isaac Opin (Walloon)
- Village
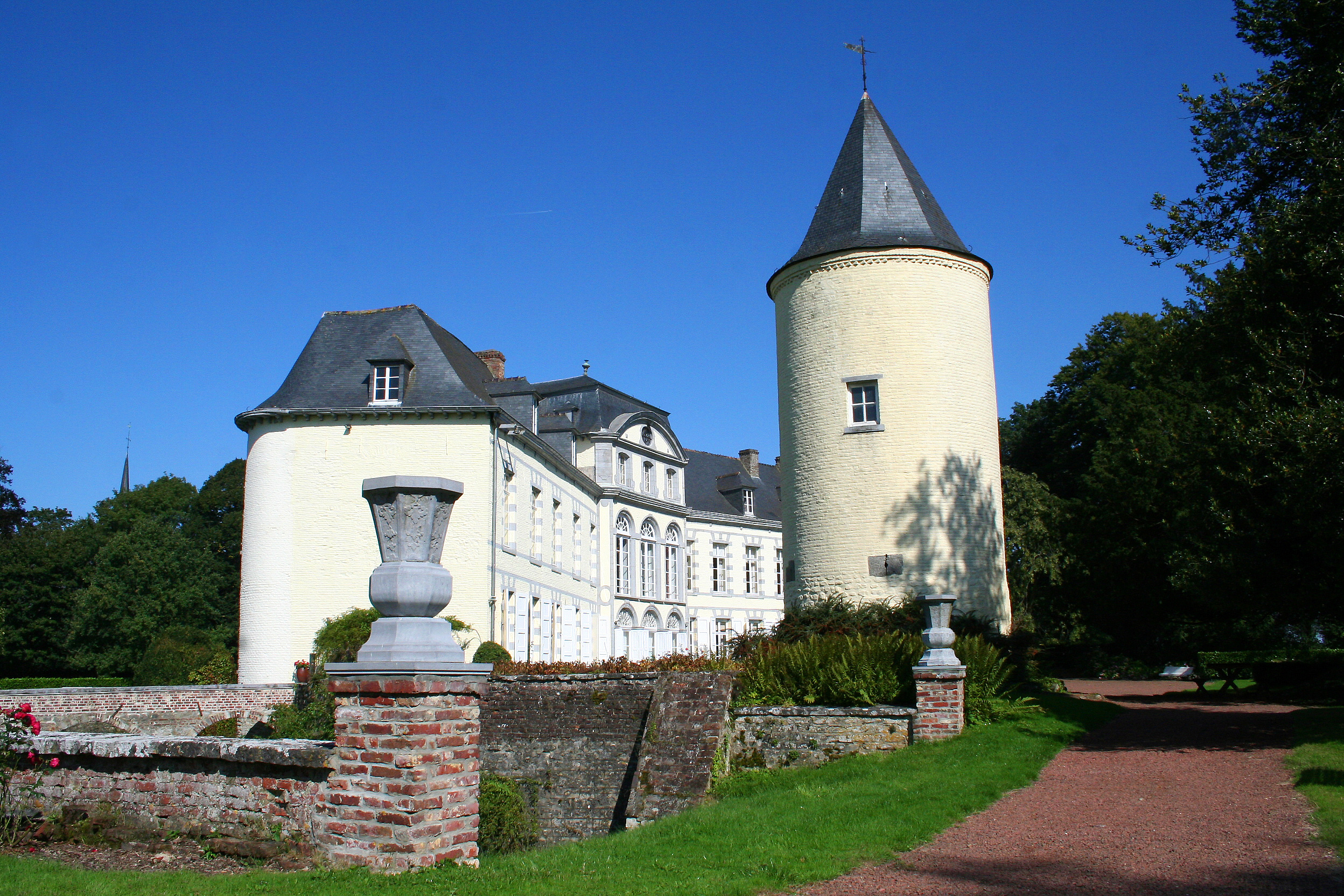
- The castle

- Coat of arms

- Location within Walloon Brabant
- Country: Belgium
- Region: Wallonia
- Province: Walloon Brabant
- Municipality: Braine-l'Alleud

Ophain-Bois-Seigneur-Isaac (Walloon: Opin) is a village of Wallonia and a district of the municipality of Braine-l'Alleud, located in the province of Walloon Brabant, Belgium.

It was a municipality in its own right before the fusion of the Belgian municipalities in 1977.
