= 1900–1949 in LGBTQ rights =

This is a list of notable events in the history of LGBTQ rights that took place in the 20th century before 1949.

== Events ==
=== 1900s ===
==== 1901 ====
- June 8 — The first documented same-sex marriage in Spain in post-Roman times is performed. Marcela Gracia Ibeas and Elisa Sanchez Loriga were married by a parish priest in A Coruña (Galicia), with Elisa using the male identity "Mario Sánchez". The priest later discovered the deception but the marriage certificate was never officially voided.

==== 1907 ====
- On April 27, German newspaper writer Maximillian Harden publicly outed the homosexuality of Prince Eulenburg in the newspaper Die Zukunft, after previously outing General Kuno Grof von Moltke in 1906. Public trials followed, and, while neither were proven to have taken part on homosexual actions, both Eulenburg and Moltke lost their credibility and reputation.

=== 1910s ===
==== 1912 ====
- November — Following his arrest in Portland, Oregon, for shoplifting, 19-year-old Benjamin Trout tells police that he was "corrupted" by adult men in the town. This news incites a moral panic which comes to be known as the Portland vice scandal. Dozens of men and boys are arrested on charges ranging from lewd behaviour to sodomy, and the state legislature responds by passing a law allowing for the forced sterilization of "sexual perverts".

1913

- Marcel Proust's In Search of Lost Time is published in France, marking the first time a modern Western author treats homosexuality openly in literature.

==== 1916 ====
- The United States military begins issuing blue discharges, a form of Military discharge that was neither honorable nor dishonorable. During World War II, the blue discharge became the discharge of choice for commanders seeking to remove homosexuals from the ranks.

==== 1917 ====
- Following the Russian Revolution, the Bolshevik government abolishes the entirety of the Empire's criminal code. This includes Article 995, which criminalized anal sex between males.

==== 1919 ====
- Magnus Hirschfeld founds the Institut für Sexualwissenschaft, a sexology research center, in Germany.
- February — an investigation into reports of homosexual activity among sailors in Newport, Rhode Island, results in a series of arrests, courts-martial and civilian criminal trials. Details of sailors ordered to act as sexual decoys led to political embarrassment for then-Secretary of the Navy Franklin Roosevelt.

=== 1920s ===
==== 1920 ====
- May 23 — Harvard University establishes an ad hoc committee to investigate homosexual activity at the school. Following two weeks of inquiries, Harvard expels several students. The tribunal becomes known as the "Secret Court" after records filed under that name are discovered in 2002.

==== 1921 ====
- The UK House of Commons votes to extend the Labouchere Amendment, which criminalizes sexual acts between males, to women. The House of Lords rejects the measure.

==== 1924 ====
- December 10 — The Society for Human Rights (SHR), the first LGBTQ rights organization in the United States, is founded by Henry Gerber and chartered by the state of Illinois. SHR published the first known American LGBTQ publication, Friendship and Freedom. The Society existed for only a few months before it collapsed in the wake of the arrests of Gerber and several Society members.

==== 1927 ====
- The New York Assembly amends the state's obscenity code to ban the appearance or discussion of homosexuality on the public stage.

==== 1928 ====
- July 27 — The Well of Loneliness by Radclyffe Hall is published in England.
- November 9 — The obscenity trial for The Well of Loneliness begins. On the 16th, Chief Magistrate Sir Chartres Biron declares the book obscene.

==== 1929 ====
- Section 171 of the Criminal Code of Cyprus is enacted as part of a new criminal code in the country, criminalizing homosexual acts between consenting male adults. It would be repealed in 1998.
- A committee of the Reichstag votes 15–13 to repeal Paragraph 175. However, in the wake of the worldwide Depression the full body never votes.

=== 1930s ===
==== 1933 ====
- May 6 — Members of the Nazi Party sack the Institut für Sexualwissenschaft. A few days later they publicly burn the Institute's archives.

==== 1934 ====
- January — The Soviet Union orchestrates mass arrests of homosexuals in Moscow and Leningrad.
- March — The Soviet Union criminalizes consensual sexual acts between adult males as a crime against the State. Conviction carries a penalty of five years' hard labor.

==== 1935 ====
- June 28 — The Nazis expand the language of Paragraph 175 to cover virtually any contact between men. Arrests under the expanded law skyrocket from under 1,000 in 1932 to over 8,500 in 1938.

==== 1936 ====
- The Nazis establish the Federal Security Department for Combating Abortion and Homosexuality.

==== 1938 ====
- A new Nazi directive allows for men convicted of gross indecency with another man to be sent directly to a concentration camp.

==== 1939 ====
- January 12 — The Georgia Supreme Court rules that "The crime of sodomy as defined by statute cannot be accomplished between two women."

=== 1940s ===
==== 1940 ====
- A new Nazi directive requires any man arrested for homosexual activities with more than one partner be transferred to a concentration camp after completing his prison term.
- May — Psychiatrists Harry Stack Sullivan and Winfred Overholser formulate guidelines for the psychiatric screening of United States military inductees. While both believe homosexuals should not be inducted, their proposal does not explicitly exclude homosexuals.

==== 1941 ====
- May — The United States Army Surgeon General's office issues a circular that for the first time classifies "homosexual proclivities" as disqualifying inductees for military service. Similar exclusive policies are adopted by the United States Navy and the Selective Service.
- December 21 – Aleister Crowley issues Liber OZ, stating that "Man has the right to love as he will:— "take your fill and will of love as ye will, when, where, and with whom ye will." —AL. I. 51.

==== 1942 ====
- August 6 — The Vichy government introduced a discriminative law in penal code: article 334 (moved to article 331 on February 8, 1945, by the Provisional Government of the French Republic) increased the age of consent to 21 for homosexual relations and 15 for heterosexual ones.

==== 1943 ====
- Heinrich Himmler issues a directive that allows homosexuals to be released from concentration camps if they underwent castration. However, those who were released under this edict were sent to fight in the Dirlewanger Brigade, which for practical purposes was a death sentence.
- As Allied forces begin liberating Nazi concentration camps, some American and British jurists conclude that the camps did not technically constitute prisons. If a gay man had served part of a prison sentence for violating Paragraph 175, he could be returned to prison to serve the remainder of his sentence. It is unknown how many men were returned to prison.

==== 1944 ====
- October — TB MED 100 establishes homosexuality as a reason for disqualifying recruits into the Women's Army Corps.

==== 1945 ====
- The Veterans Administration institutes a policy of denying G.I. Bill benefits to veterans holding blue discharges, despite the explicit language of the Bill that the only discharge that disqualified a veteran was a dishonorable one. The VA renewed this directive in 1946 and 1949.
- Four honorably discharged gay World War II veterans found the Veterans Benevolent Association. Although primarily a social club, VBA formed in part in response to the sense of injustice that many gay veterans felt about being given blue discharges, with its attendant negative legal and societal connotations. VBA worked in coalition with Black and labor organizations against the arbitrary issuance of blue discharges.

==== 1946 ====
- January 30 — The House Committee on Military Affairs issues a report called Blue Discharges. The committee finds that the use of the blue discharge is discriminatory and singles out the VA for special criticism for denying blue discharge holders G.I. Bill benefits.

==== 1947 ====
- July 1 — Congress discontinues the blue discharge, replacing it with two new classifications, general and undesirable. At the same time, however, the Army changes its regulations to ensure that gay and lesbian service members would not qualify for general discharges.

==== 1948 ====
- Harry Hay conceives of the idea of a homosexual activist group. He develops this idea over the next two years, co-founding the Mattachine Society, the first sustained LGBTQ rights group in the United States, in 1950.
- Alfred Kinsey and the Institute for Sex Research publish Sexual Behavior in the Human Male, the first of two Kinsey Reports.

==== 1949 ====
- The Préfet de Paris issues a decree banning men from dancing together in public places.
- October — The newly consolidated United States Department of Defense standardizes anti-homosexual regulations across all branches of the military: "Homosexual personnel, irrespective of sex, should not be permitted to serve in any branch of the Armed Forces in any capacity, and prompt separation of known homosexuals from the Armed Forces is mandatory."

== See also ==
- Timeline of LGBTQ history – timeline of events from 12,000 BCE to present
- LGBTQ rights by country or territory – current legal status around the world
- LGBTQ history in France
- LGBTQ movements
