= Portland vice scandal =

1912 scandal in Portland, Oregon, U.S.

The Portland vice scandal (sometimes called the vice clique scandal, or the vice crusade or YMCA scandal in contemporary reports) refers to the discovery in November 1912 of a gay male subculture in the U.S. city of Portland, Oregon. Nearly 70 men were charged, and three were convicted by jury; the Oregon Supreme Court then reversed the convictions on legal technicalities. The event led to the persecution of LGBTQ people and increased public support for eugenics in Oregon.

== Background ==
At the time the scandal broke, Oregon's sodomy law merely said, "If any person shall commit sodomy or the crime against nature, either with mankind or beast, such person, upon conviction thereof shall be punished by imprisonment in the penitentiary not less than one year nor more than five years." Most of the people arrested for sodomy during this period were from working-class backgrounds, and many were immigrants. Up to this point, in some U.S. states with sodomy laws similar to Oregon's, courts had ruled that these statutes covered anal sex, but not oral sex. These cases cited the 1817 English case Rex v. Jacobs.

Previously, in 1895, newspapers all across Oregon printed reporting on the trial of Oscar Wilde, a UK writer who was imprisoned for sodomy following the reveal of his personal life and contacts during a libel trial. Historian Peter Boag argues that the coverage of the Wilde trial was most Oregonians' first exposure to LGBTQ life in the middle to upper classes. People in the northwest viewed queerness (then referred to as "sexual inversion") as a kind of social degeneration, and papers such as the Oregonian painted Wilde as an effeminate, physically deformed monster who led youths to immorality. However, Americans broadly viewed queerness in the middle and upper classes as "an exclusively European problem", and as a type of "degenerate" behavior that was inherent to immigrant and poor communities–not among their own "respectable" middle and upper class communities.

== Beginnings of the scandal ==
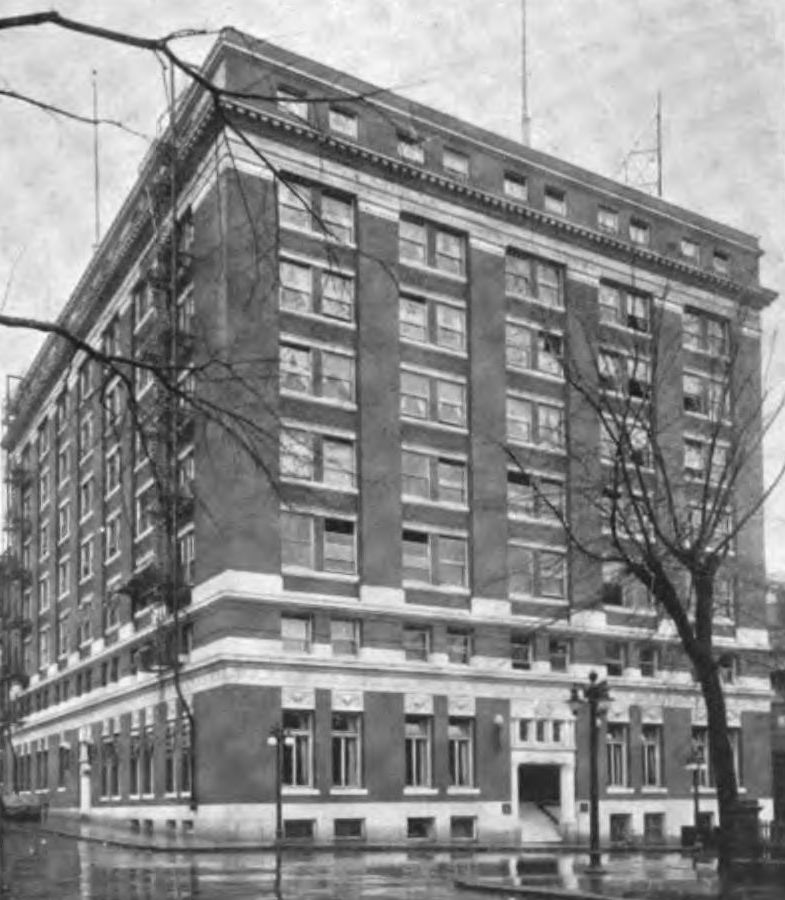
The old YMCA building in Portland, 1914

On November 8, 1912, following the arrest and interrogation of a teenager for shoplifting, he told his interrogators that "he had been 'corrupted' by a number of men in town."

The teenager was identified variously as fourteen-year-old Hazen Wright or nineteen-year-old Benjamin Trout. The person identified as the perpetrator was 39-year-old Harry Rowe, who lived at the local YMCA, which had the ninth largest membership of all YMCAs in North America.

This revelation prompted police investigations and led to the arrest of around 69 men "for crimes ranging from so-called indecent acts to sodomy." The press used the term "vice clique" to refer to these men collectively. Since a crime against nature such as this was not considered to be consensual, the parties were described as predators and victims or "boy victim", though only categorized by which participant was older.

Some who were reported to be members of the vice clique were prominent public figures including Edward McAllister, as well as lawyers and physicians. Some of the accused lived at the local YMCA, which was supported by members of Portland's upper class. Considered "unprintable" content, it still prompted attacks against the YMCA, its sponsors, and the city's upper class, especially by the working-class newspaper The Portland News and its editor Dana Sleeth.

== Investigation ==
The investigations took several months, starting in late 1912 and continuing into 1913.

== People implicated ==
Most of the people involved in the scandal were unmarried middle-class white-collar workers, such as bookkeepers and clerks. Six of those implicated lived at the YMCA "or had lived there within the previous year."

Three individuals were convicted of sodomy: Edward McAllister, physician Harry Start, and clerk and bookkeeper Edward E. Wedemeyer.

=== Theodore Kruse and the Louvre ===
The scandal exposed Theodore Kruse and the Louvre restaurant in Portland, which he had owned.

Kruse (February 13, 1864, Germany – November 3, 1941, Gearhart, Oregon) started in Portland with the Kruse Grill around 1891. In 1906, Kruse was married to his second wife, Marion F., in Spokane, Washington; the two divorced in 1908. He then purchased the Louvre restaurant, running it and Portland's Belvedere Hotel starting around 1907. He was married to his third wife, Marie E. Daggett, at the time. In August 1911, while in the process of setting up Hotel Carlton, he disappeared mysteriously, days before a large payment was due to the Gevurtz Furniture Company for the Carlton, who formed a company and took over the hotel lease. This was front-page news in the Oregonian. A month later, his wife sent people to Seattle to look for him, and the Oregonian described him as surfacing there with a young man. He suddenly reappeared on March 24, 1912, at the Carlton.

In April 1912 his third wife was granted divorce from him, citing his "cruel and inhuman treatment" (a common grounds for divorce before no-fault divorce was legal). She described him as flirting with clientele at his restaurant in 1911 before his disappearance, and recounted that he was first in Quebec, then she sent a stepson (from his previous marriage) to Europe and found him in Germany. He stated his wife had died and he had retired. He then traveled through Europe (Monte Carlo, Naples, Rome), before suddenly reappearing.

The Louvre was described as having an "immoral atmosphere" and on a list of eight "gay refectories" in Portland in 1911 by a local judge. It had a mens-only dining room. By 1912 it was linked to the clique, especially Kruse and Rigó. Kruse then closed the Louve and opened the Rainbow Grill in October 1913, which advertised "fat, juicy, delicious" oysters and a "Special Men's Grill" with meat of the diner's choosing. It closed in June 1915.

=== Rigó Jancsi ===
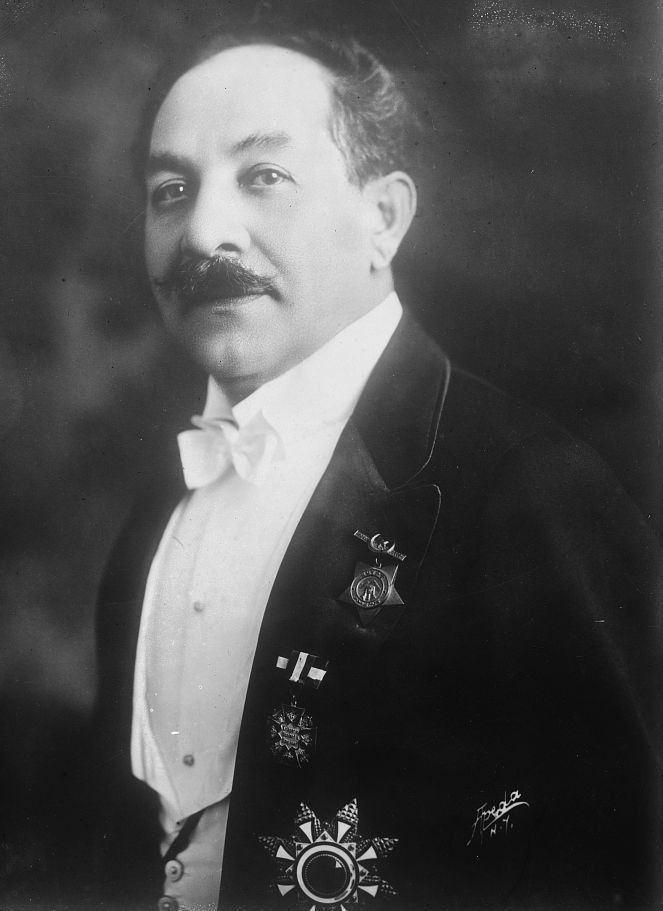
Jancsi, around 1919

Another individual caught up in the scandal was Hungarian violinist popular in Portland, Rigó Jancsi (1867–1927), known as "Gypsy" Rigó, described by the Oregonian as "violin virtuoso, gipsy of romance, gay Lothario." He had played at the Louvre, perhaps starting in 1909, then was caught in the clique in the November 1912 events. Rigó had previously been embroiled in scandal when he eloped with Clara Ward, Princesse de Caraman-Chimay, despite her still being married to her first husband. The marriage didn't last, as Rigó continued with his "insatiable and well-publicized appetite for women"; this reputation helped clear him of the vice charges.

=== Edward McAllister ===
One of the most prominent members of the vice clique was Edward Stonewall Jackson McAllister, a Portland attorney, Progressive activist, leader in the state Democratic Party, and friend of William Simon U'Ren and C.E.S. Wood.

During his trial, The Morning Oregonian would report that he was charged with committing an "immoral act." According to the written opinion in State v. McAllister, 67 Or 480, 136 P 354, McAllister was charged with committing sodomy with 30 year old "boy victim" Roy Kadel (1882–1934) on October 28, 1912, in McAllister's law office in downtown Portland. The indictment merely stated that his charge was "commit[ting] the crime against nature," which was "too well understood and too disgusting to be herein more fully set forth." But Oregon Supreme Court justice Charles McNary, in his dissent in McAllister, shed more light on the matter:

The testimony of the witness Harry Work is undisputed, and, in narrative form, is that he met Roy Kadel on one of the busy thoroughfares of Portland, and accompanied him unwittingly to the office of the defendant, where both remained in the reception-room until Kadel was beckoned by defendant to enter his private office; that, growing impatient at the failure of Kadel to return, Work stepped into the hall and knocked on the door leading into defendant's private office, whereupon defendant opened the door and Work entered and saw Kadel wiping his penis with a handkerchief; that Work ejaculated [blurted out], "Hello, what is this?" and Kadel replied, "McAllister and I are having a little trade," which, in the parlance of the morally depraved, means the performance of the act defined in the indictment; that Work further stated: "Well, I'm in a hurry; I am going back to the hotel"--and defendant remarked, "All right, boys, I'll see you again"; thereat Work and Kadel stepped into the hallway and were gone.

A warrant for McAllister's arrest was issued November 19. According to a contemporary news report in The Morning Oregonian, he was in Marshfield (now called Coos Bay) on that day, "taking depositions in a legal case." Furthermore, he "was incensed when he heard the nature of the charge that had been lodged against him" and professed his innocence. He promised to return to Portland to face charges, but on November 21, he was arrested on a southbound train at the Medford train station, near the California state line. He denied his identity, but several people in Medford recognized him. He claimed he was headed to Ashland to meet with his law partner, but "authorities believe[d] he was trying to leave the state."

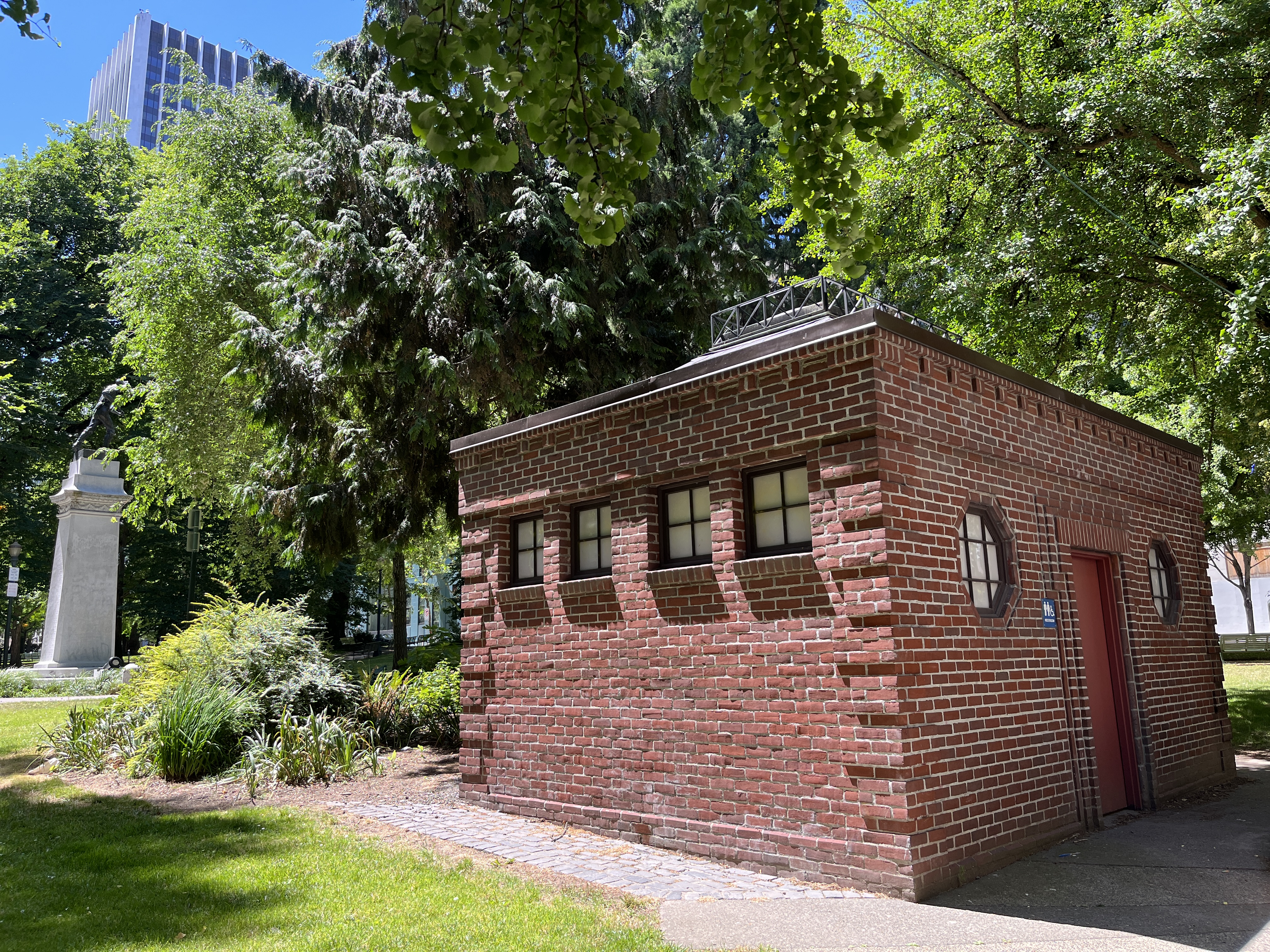
The brick building shown here is the public restroom in Lownsdale Square. During this time period, gay men called it the "T" room and used it for anonymous sex and cruising.

In McAllister's trial, Judge John P. Kavanaugh permitted testimony of acts of sodomy allegedly committed by McAllister with people other than Kadel, "for the purpose of showing mental disposition and casting light on the probability of the committal of the act actually charged." Men testified that he was known as "Mother McAllister" at Lownsdale Square, a gay cruising site. The defense argued that these testimonies infringed upon McAllister's constitutional rights. In charging the jury, Kavanaugh gave the following instruction:

The court thinks that a man with normal sexual instincts is incapable of committing the crime, and that it is only a person of abnormal sexual sense that is capable of committing it. So if you were satisfied that one was possessed of this unnatural or abnormal sexual sense, you might infer that he had a motive, a reason or a force, impelling him to do such an act.

The defense would later argue on appeal, successfully, that Kavanaugh made a prejudicial error in giving his personal opinion to the jury rather than stating only matters of law.

McAllister made a closing argument for the defense on his own behalf, described as "an eloquent plea", wherein "he charged that he [was] the victim of a conspiracy." On February 22, 1913, the jury convicted him, but recommended "leniency in punishment." On February 25, he was sentenced to one to five years in the state penitentiary, the maximum sentence called for by statute. Notice of appeal to the Oregon Supreme Court was immediately filed.

=== Others ===
Other individuals implicated in the scandal included William H. Allen, who attempted to commit suicide with chloroform at the YMCA following the exposure; George Birdseye; Fred A. Clark; architect Lionel Dean; Kenneth Hollister; George Parker; Will Phelps; Robert Ray (witness in Harry Start's trial); Alonzo "Billy" E. Ream (1856–1930); Fred Rodby; Horace Tabb (at the Multnomah Hotel); Earl Taylor; and Earl van Hulen. Claude Bronner and Nathan Healy lived with each other at 1731 S.W. Taylor, and Healy turned on Bronner, who served time. John Moffitt, a photographer, was caught in the scandal and then advertised his services as "Photographer of Men".

== Responses and impact ==
=== Community response ===
Discussing the scandal, a letter to the editor in the Portland News said, "If these degenerating practices were committed by Greeks or Hindus, these lily whites... would be in favor of drowning them in the Willamette [River]." Boag compares the scandal to an 1894 article in the Evening Telegram, which described "One of the most atrocious crimes ever committed in this city... a big stalwart negro named Fred Jones, a scowdweller..."; Boag argues this demonstrates the racist and anti-working-class biases in the city.

In response to the scandal, local schools began to explicitly promote heterosexuality in new sex education materials.

Increased public awareness of local LGBTQ culture led to increased active campaigns against LGBTQ rights in Oregon and contributed to growing support for eugenics in Oregon, as people argued that homosexuality and other "deviant" sexual acts and preferences were caused by genetic defects and could be passed on to children. The public commonly used the word "degenerate" and "degeneracy" to refer to the "vices" people were accused of. Some began to advocate for the forced sterilization and castration of LGBTQ people to prevent future "degenerate practices" such as those alleged in the vice scandal.

=== Legislative response ===
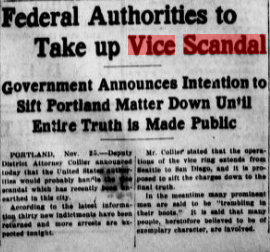
Snippet from the Evening Herald, November 25, 1912

Walter Lafferty, Portland's U.S. Representative, vowed to bring the scandal to Washington's attention, though his efforts were short-lived.

The Oregon state legislature responded to the scandal by amending the state's sodomy law with 1913 Oregon House Bill 145. The law was clarified and broadened to include "any act or practice of sexual perversity," including fellatio. At the time, courts had previously ruled that sodomy laws similar to Oregon's did not cover oral sex, and it was believed that convictions based on oral rather than anal sex acts might be reversed. Also under House Bill 145, the maximum sentence for sodomy in the state penitentiary was tripled, from five years to fifteen.

As urged by Governor Oswald West, the legislature also passed 1913 Oregon House Bill 69, a law that authorized the sterilization of "sexual perverts" and "moral degenerates," which were defined as "those addicted to the practice of sodomy or the crime against nature, or to other gross, bestial and perverted sexual habits and practices prohibited by statute."

People opposed to sterilization, including Catholic clergymen and reformers such as William Simon U'Ren, formed the Anti-Sterilization League and successfully forced a referendum on this legislation. Oregon voters repealed it by a vote of 56 percent to 44 in November 1913. However, the legislature passed a similar law in 1917.

=== Action by the Oregon Supreme Court ===
Edward McAllister, Harry Start, and Edward E. E. Wedemeyer, the three men who were sentenced to the state penitentiary for sodomy, appealed their convictions. The Oregon Supreme Court first heard Start's case in May 1913 and reversed the conviction in State v. Start, 65 Or 178, 132 P 512 (1913), finding that the trial judge had allowed extraneous testimony that possibly prejudiced the jury. Wedemeyer's conviction was also reversed around that time. McAllister's convictions were reversed on the same grounds in November 1913. Justice Charles McNary, a future U.S. Senator, was a new court justice by the time McAllister's appeal was heard. McNary wrote the dissent for McAllister's case, which was emotionally charged and "revealed a deeply seated personal discomfort with same-sex eroticism" according to the Oregon State Bar Bulletin. Days later, McAllister was expelled from the Multnomah Bar Association. In 2000, over 74 years after his death, he was reinstated to the Bar.

These convictions were not reversed on the basis that oral sex was not covered under Oregon's sodomy law, as the legislature feared the court might rule. In fact, despite legislation previous to Start ensuring that fellatio counted as a "crime against nature," the court ruled that this was necessarily true because, among other reasons, the mouth and anus are both openings of the alimentary canal and therefore equally unsuited to sexual intercourse.

== See also ==
- 1900–1949 in LGBTQ rights
- Boise homosexuality scandal
- First homosexual movement
- Gay Nineties (1890s)
- Greek love
- The History of Sexuality by Michael Foucault
- Newport sex scandal
- Pansy Craze (c. 1920s–1930s)
- Portland Police Bureau and the LGBTQ community
- Rigójancsi – named for Rigó Jancsi

== Bibliography ==
- Boag, Peter (2003). Same-Sex Affairs: Constructing and Controlling Homosexuality in the Pacific Northwest. Berkeley: University of California Press. ISBN 0-520-24048-0.
