= Portland Police Bureau and the LGBTQ community =

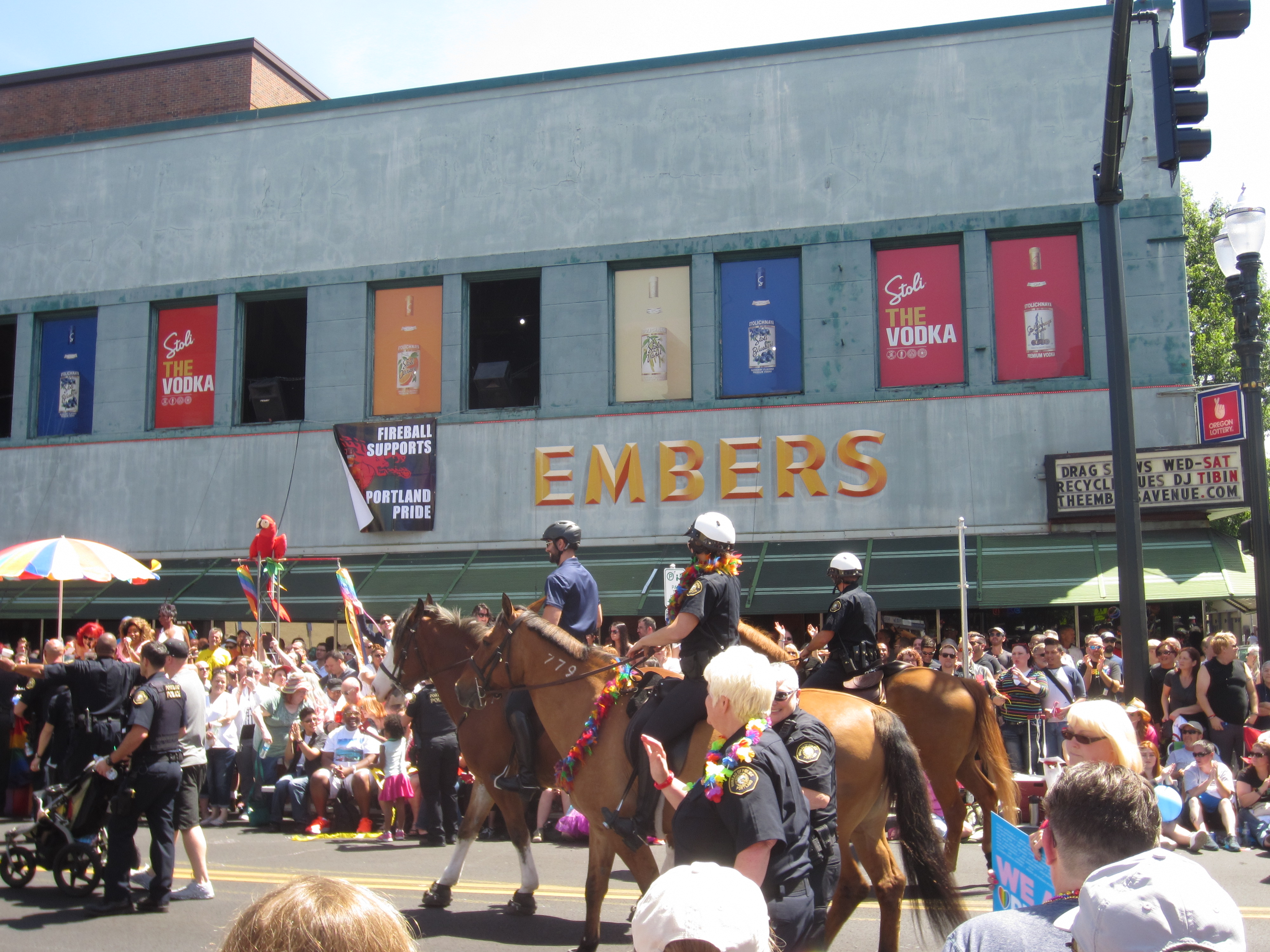
Portland Police Bureau representation at Portland's pride parade in 2016

The Portland Police Bureau was founded in 1870, and has been making societal changes in their city before others across the country, naming the first female police officer, Lola Baldwin, in 1908, being the first Bureau to ever do so in the United States. Its interaction with the LGBTQ community dates back to as early as 1912, with the Portland vice scandal, which involved many arrests in the community due to “indecency” or even counts of sodomy, when the arrests had little viable evidence and were heavily biased. The community kept low throughout the next few decades, until the early 1960s, when the community began to grow in size along with the rest of the city. Writers for papers such as The Oregon Journal stated: “The unmentionable people are virtually untouchable and they are growing stronger each week.” These reports were odd and prompted some early arrests in the 60s for “sex and pornography offenses” which prompted uproar. After these small incidents, the police became hands off with the LGBTQ community, and throughout the decades have embraced their inclusion in the Portland community, swearing to protect and serve all citizens of Portland. In 1977, the city recognized a national gay pride day, and campaigns against bigoted state measures in the 1990s helped halt discrimination and put Portland on the path to its current inclusive social environment.

== Portland vice scandal (1912–1913) ==
The Portland vice scandal was one of the city's first exposure to the LGBTQ community, and shook the city in an era where that identity was unthinkable and shunned. On November 8, 1912, the Portland Police arrested 19-year-old Benjamin Trout for a minor offense, and through his investigation, he revealed local homosexual activity in the city that was just beginning to show. This was many Portlanders' first exposure to the LGBTQ community, and was front-page news for weeks. This led to more than 50 arrests throughout the city for acts such as sodomy, indecency, and immoral acts. Many could not be charged due to lack of evidence, but seven people pleaded guilty and faced charges. Some of those implicated fled and hid in the YMCA, with one man committing suicide due to the humiliation brought by public scrutiny. After the scandal, schools started to educate and promote heterosexuality, and support for eugenics in Oregon grew, with people calling for sterilization of "offenders".

== Attempt to halt LGBTQ scene (1964–1967) ==
Throughout the start of the 20th century, the number of LGBTQ bars and hangout spots in the city grew and gained popularity as the decades went on. This came to a boiling point in 1963. Oregon Police made a series of arrests for various sex and pornography charges, and then-Portland mayor Terry Schrunk vowed to put an end to it. Schrunk had been mayor for 16 years, and promoted equality for the traditional household and citizen, which followed racial and sexual guidelines at the time. His next move at the time was to shut down six bars, which saw police officers escorting bar goers on their way and clearing out the place, but the Oregon Liquor Control Commission (OLCC) refused to give away the licensing to the bar, thus putting a halt to the mayors attempts on slowing down the scene. By 1967, nobody was caring about the bars or the overall presence of the LGBTQ community, police included. Almost every other large city across the U.S. faced harassment issues towards their LGBTQ communities, but Portland's failed attempt to do this earlier in the decade did the opposite, and it was a city that saw a shift in culture change come the 1970s, one that was inclusive and much different from cities that spanned across the country.

== Inclusion and present-day interaction (1970s–present) ==
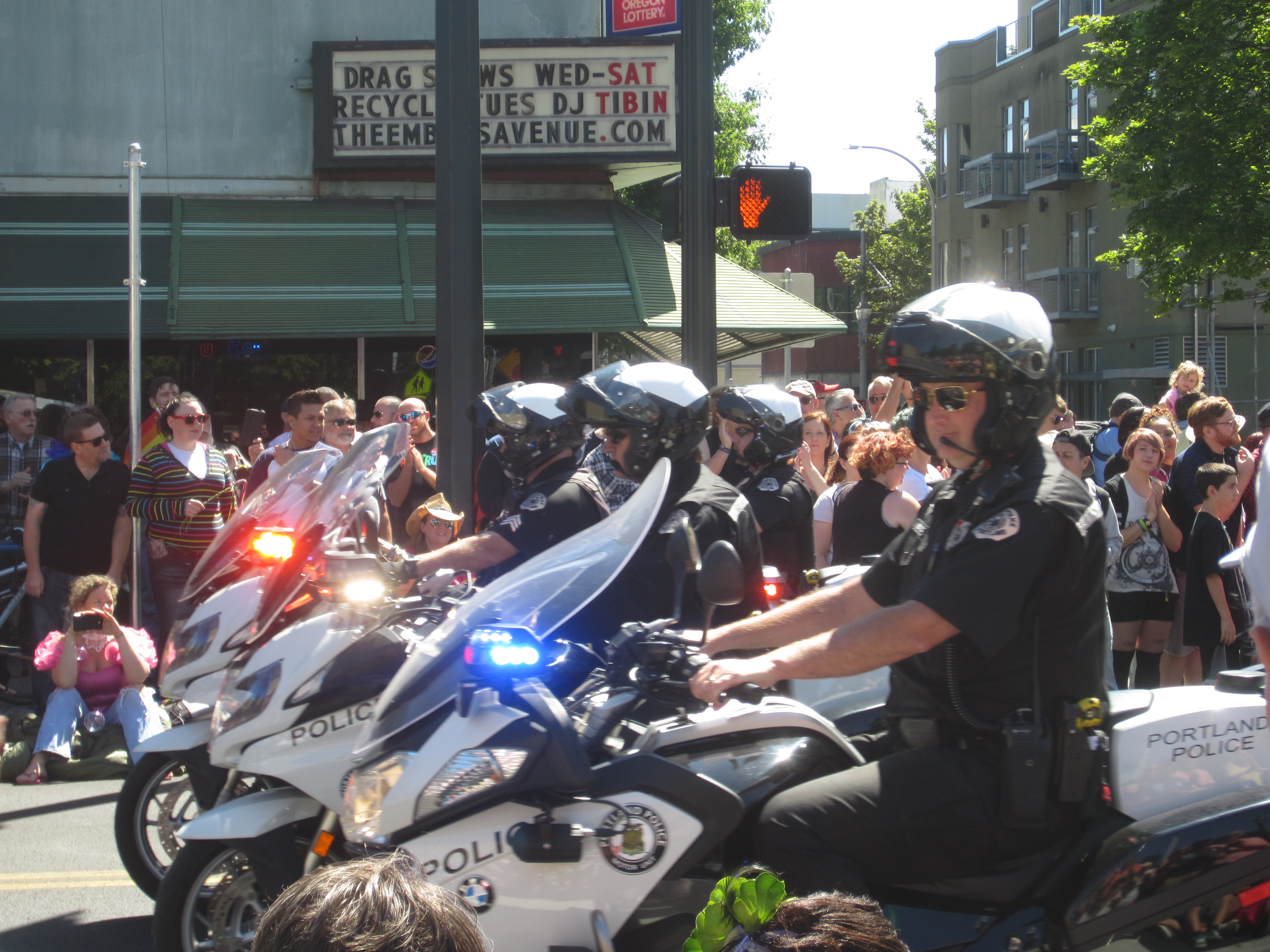
Officers at Portland's LGBTQ pride parade in 2016

Portland Police have spent many of the past few decades adjusting to the culture shift that Portland has gone through, however they participate in citywide events often, offering assistance and protection during the event. During June, the city of Portland holds a pride week for the community, and the Portland Police provides protection and security for those participating in these events. Now, the bureau gives new opportunity to the community by offering self defense classes to any gender identity for free. Once the 1970s had approached, and after the cities failed attempt to crack down on the community, LGBTQ safe spaces and hubs around the city began to flourish. One of these was Dema's Bar, which was purchased by Walter Cole, also known as Darcelle XV. Cole soon turned the bar into a theater in 1971, using it for the Darcelle XV drag show, the longest running drag show in the United States. These events became common in the city and allowed freedom of expression for the first time in the city's history. In 1981, Portland Police Chief Penny Harrington appointed Deputy Chief Tom Potter as the Bureau's first ever liaison between the police and the LGBTQ community.
