= Nocturnal enuresis =

Involuntary urination while asleep

- Other names: Nighttime urinary incontinence, sleepwetting, bedwetting
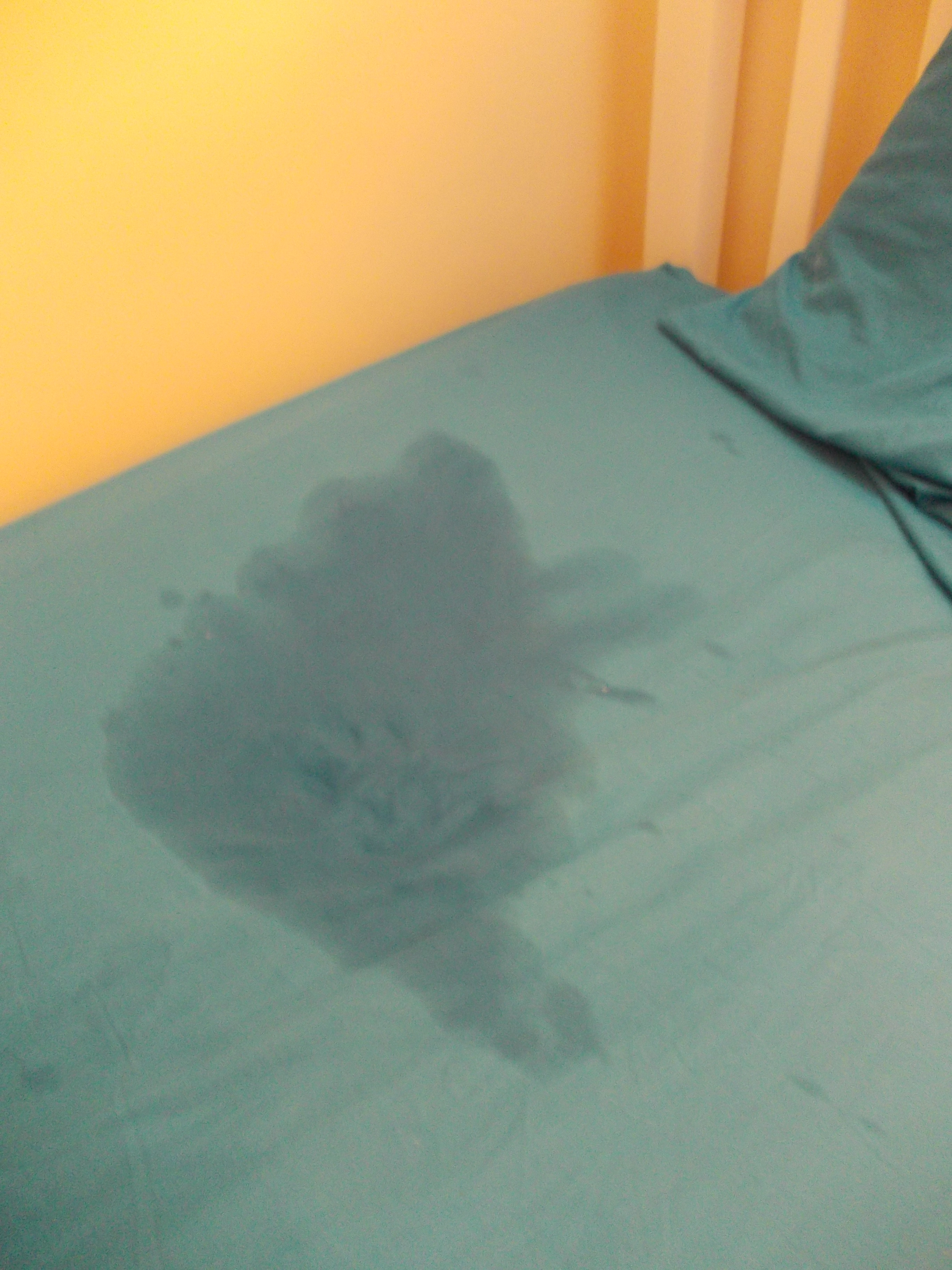
- Urine mark on bedding caused by a nocturnal enuresis episode
- Specialty: Pediatrics, urology

Nocturnal enuresis (NE), also informally called bedwetting, is involuntary urination while asleep after the age at which bladder control usually begins. Bedwetting in children and adults can result in emotional stress. Complications can include urinary tract infections.

Most bedwetting is a developmental delay—not an emotional problem or physical illness. Only a small percentage (5 to 10%) of bedwetting cases have a specific medical cause. Bedwetting is commonly associated with a family history of the condition. Nocturnal enuresis is considered primary when a child has not yet had a prolonged period of being dry. Secondary nocturnal enuresis is when a child or adult begins wetting again after having stayed dry.

Treatments range from behavioral therapy, such as bedwetting alarms, to medication, such as hormone replacement, and even surgery such as urethral dilation. Since most bedwetting is simply a developmental delay, most treatment plans aim to protect or improve self-esteem. Treatment guidelines recommend that the physician counsel the parents, warning about psychological consequences caused by pressure, shaming, or punishment for a condition children cannot control.

Bedwetting is the most common childhood complaint.

== Impact ==
A review of medical literature shows doctors consistently stressing that a bedwetting child is not at fault for the situation. Many medical studies state that the psychological impacts of bedwetting are more important than the physical considerations. "It is often the child's and family members' reaction to bedwetting that determines whether it is a problem or not."

=== Self-esteem ===
Whether bedwetting causes low self-esteem remains a subject of debate, but several studies have found that self-esteem improved with management of the condition.

Children questioned in one study ranked bedwetting as the third most stressful life event, after "parental war of words", divorce and parental fighting. Adolescents in the same study ranked bedwetting as tied for second with parental fighting.

Bedwetters face problems ranging from being teased by siblings, being punished by parents, the embarrassment of still having to wear diapers, and being afraid that friends will find out.

Psychologists report that the amount of psychological harm depends on whether the bedwetting harms self-esteem or development of social skills. Key factors are:

- How much the bedwetting limits social activities like sleep-overs and campouts
- The degree of the social ostracism by peers
- (Perceived) Anger, punishment, refusal and rejection by caregivers along with subsequent guilt
- The number of failed treatment attempts
- How long the child has been wetting

=== Behavioral impact ===
Studies indicate that children with behavioral problems are more likely to wet their beds. For children who have developmental problems, the behavioral problems and the bedwetting are frequently part of/caused by the developmental issues. For bedwetting children without other developmental issues, these behavioral issues can result from self-esteem issues and stress caused by the wetting.

Current studies show that it is very rare for a child to intentionally wet the bed as a method of acting out.

=== Punishment for bedwetting ===
Medical literature states, and studies show, that punishing or shaming a child for bedwetting will frequently make the situation worse. It is best described as a downward cycle, where a child punished for bedwetting feels shame and a loss of self-confidence. This can cause increased bedwetting incidents, leading to more punishment and shaming.

In the United States, about 25% of enuretic children are punished for wetting the bed. In Hong Kong, 57% of enuretic children are punished for wetting. Parents with only a grade-school level education punish bedwetting children at twice the rate of high-school- and college-educated parents.

In Korea and in small parts of Japan, there is a folk tradition whereby bedwetters are made to wear a winnowing basket on their head and sent to ask their neighbors for salt. This is motivated in part by a desire to publicly embarrass the child into compliance, as neighbors would recognize why the child was knocking on their door.

=== Families ===
Parents and family members are frequently stressed by a child's bedwetting. Soiled linens and clothing cause additional laundry. Wetting episodes can cause lost sleep if the child wakes and/or cries, waking the parents. A European study estimated that a family with a child who wets nightly will pay about $1,000 a year for additional laundry, extra sheets, diapers, and mattress replacement.

Despite these stressful effects, doctors emphasize that parents should react patiently and supportively.

=== Sociopathy ===
Bedwetting was once proposed to be linked to sociopathy, as part of the so-called Macdonald triad, but subsequent research generally does not support the validity of this notion. The Macdonald triad is a set of three behavioral characteristics described by John Macdonald in 1963. The other two characteristics were firestarting and animal abuse. Macdonald suggested that there was an association between a person displaying all three characteristics, then later displaying sociopathic criminal behavior. According to some estimates, up to 60% of multiple murderers wet their beds post-adolescence.

However, more recent researchers have noted that "the triad, or its individual constituents, is better used as an indicator of dysfunctional home environments, or poor coping skills in children". Some argue that it is the childhood experience of parental neglect, brutality or abuse that actually leads to "homicidal proneness". More specifically on bedwetting, it has been noted that it is an "unconscious, involuntary, and nonviolent act and therefore linking it to violent crime is more problematic than doing so with animal cruelty or firesetting".

== Causes ==
The etiology of NE is not fully understood, although there are three common causes: excessive urine volume, poor sleep arousal, and bladder contractions. Differentiation of cause is mainly based on patient history and fluid charts completed by the parent or carer to inform management options.

Bedwetting has a strong genetic component. Children whose parents were not enuretic have only a 15% incidence of bedwetting. When one or both parents were bedwetters, the rates jump to 44% and 77% respectively.

These first two factors (etiology and genetic component) are the most common in bedwetting, but current medical technology offers no easy testing for either cause. There is no test to prove that bedwetting is only a developmental delay, and genetic testing offers little or no benefit. As a result, other conditions should be ruled out. The following causes are less common, but are easier to prove and more clearly treated:

In some bedwetting children there is no increase in ADH (antidiuretic hormone) production, while other children may produce an increased amount of ADH but their response is insufficient.

- People with reported bedwetting issues are 2.7 times more likely to be diagnosed with attention deficit hyperactivity disorder.
- Caffeine increases urine production.
- Chronic constipation can cause bed wetting. When the bowels are full, it can put pressure on the bladder. Often such children defecate normally, yet they retain a significant mass of material in the bowel which causes bedwetting.
- Infections and disease are more strongly connected with secondary nocturnal enuresis and with daytime wetting. Less than 5% of all bedwetting cases are caused by infection or disease, the most common of which is a urinary tract infection.
- Patients with more severe neurological-developmental issues have a higher rate of bedwetting problems. One study of seven-year-olds showed that "handicapped and intellectually disabled children" had a bedwetting rate almost three times higher than "non-handicapped children" (26.6% vs. 9.5%, respectively).
- Psychological issues (e.g., death in the family, sexual abuse, extreme bullying) are established as a cause of secondary nocturnal enuresis (a return to bedwetting), but are very rarely a cause of PNE-type bedwetting. Bedwetting can also be a symptom of a pediatric neuropsychological disorder called PANDAS.
- Sleep apnea stemming from an upper airway obstruction has been associated with bedwetting. Snoring and enlarged tonsils or adenoids are a sign of potential sleep apnea problems.
- Sleepwalking can lead to bedwetting. During sleepwalking, the sleepwalker may think they are in another room. When the sleepwalker urinates during a sleepwalking episode, they usually think they are in the bathroom, and therefore urinate where they think the toilet should be. Cases of this have included opening a closet and urinating in it; urinating on the sofa, and simply urinating in the middle of the room.
- Stress is a cause of people who return to wetting the bed. Researchers find that moving to a new town, parent conflict or divorce, arrival of a new baby, or loss of a loved one or pet can cause insecurity, contributing to returning bedwetting.
- Type 1 diabetes mellitus can first present as nocturnal enuresis. It is classically associated with polyuria, polydipsia, and polyphagia; weight loss, lethargy, and diaper candidiasis may also be present in those with new-onset disease.
- Alcohol intoxication is a leading cause for nocturnal enuresis among adults. Alcohol suppresses the production of anti diuretic hormones and irritates the detrusor muscle in the bladder. These factors, paired with the large amount of fluid ingested, particularly during binge drinking sessions or when paired with caffeinated drinks, can lead to episodes of nocturnal enuresis.

=== Unconfirmed ===
- Food allergies may be part of the cause for some patients. This link is not well established, requiring further research.
- Improper toilet training is another disputed cause of bedwetting. This theory was more widely supported in the last century and is still cited by some authors today. Some say bedwetting can be caused by improper toilet training, either by starting the training when the child is too young or by being too forceful. Recent research has shown more mixed results and a connection to toilet training has not been proven or disproven. According to the American Academy of Pediatrics, more child abuse occurs during potty training than in any other developmental stage.
- Dandelions are reputed to be a potent diuretic, and anecdotal reports and folk wisdom say children who handle them can end up wetting the bed. English folk names for the plant are "peebeds" and "pissabeds". In French the dandelion is called pissenlit, which means "piss in bed"; likewise "piscialletto", an Italian folkname, and "meacamas" in Spanish.

== Mechanism ==
Two physical functions prevent bedwetting. The first is a hormone that reduces urine production at night. The second is the ability to wake up when the bladder is full. Children usually achieve nighttime dryness by developing one or both of these abilities. There appear to be some hereditary factors in how and when these develop.

The first ability is a hormone cycle that reduces the body's urine production. At about sunset each day, the body releases a minute burst of antidiuretic hormone (also known as arginine vasopressin or AVP). This hormone burst reduces the kidney's urine output well into the night so that the bladder does not get full until morning. This hormone cycle is not present at birth. Many children develop it between the ages of two and six years old, others between six and the end of puberty, and some not at all.

The second ability that helps people stay dry is waking when the bladder is full. This ability develops in the same age range as the vasopressin hormone, but is separate from that hormone cycle.

The typical development process begins with one- and two-year-old children developing larger bladders and beginning to sense bladder fullness. Two- and three-year-old children begin to stay dry during the day. Four- and five-year-olds develop an adult pattern of urinary control and begin to stay dry at night.

== Diagnosis ==
Thorough history regarding frequency of bedwetting, any period of dryness in between, associated daytime symptoms, constipation, and encopresis should be sought. A sleep study may be employed.

=== Voiding diary ===
- People are asked to observe, record and measure when and how much their child voids and drinks, as well as associated symptoms. A voiding diary in the form of a frequency volume chart records voided volume along with the time of each micturition for at least 24 hours. The frequency volume chart is enough for patients with complaints of nocturia and frequency only. If other symptoms are also present then a detailed bladder diary must be maintained. In a bladder diary, times of micturition and voided volume, incontinence episodes, pad usage, and other information such as fluid intake, the degree of urgency, and the degree of incontinence are recorded.

=== Physical examination ===
- Each child should be examined physically at least once at the beginning of treatment. A full pediatric and neurological exam is recommended. Measurement of blood pressure is important to rule out any renal pathology. External genitalia and lumbosacral spine should be examined thoroughly. A spinal defect, such as a dimple, hair tuft, or skin discoloration, might be visible in approximately 50% of patients with an intraspinal lesion. Thorough neurologic examination of the lower extremities, including gait, muscle power, tone, sensation, reflexes, and plantar responses should be done during first visit.

=== Classification ===
Nocturnal urinary continence is dependent on three factors: 1) nocturnal urine production, 2) nocturnal bladder function and 3) sleep and arousal mechanisms. Any child will experience nocturnal enuresis if more urine is produced than can be contained in the bladder or if the detrusor is hyperactive, provided that he or she is not awakened by the imminent bladder contraction.

==== Primary nocturnal enuresis ====
Primary nocturnal enuresis is the most common form of bedwetting. Bedwetting becomes a disorder when it persists after the age at which bladder control usually occurs (4–7 years), and is either resulting in an average of at least two wet nights a week with no long periods of dryness or not able to sleep dry without being taken to the toilet by another person.

New studies show that anti-psychotic drugs can have a side effect of causing enuresis.

It has been shown that diet impacts enuresis in children. Constipation from a poor diet can result in impacted stool in the colon putting undue pressure on the bladder creating loss of bladder control (overflow incontinence).

Some researchers, however, recommend a different starting age range. This guidance says that bedwetting can be considered a clinical problem if the child regularly wets the bed after turning 7 years old.

==== Secondary nocturnal enuresis ====
Secondary enuresis occurs after a patient goes through an extended period of dryness at night (six months or more) and then reverts to night-time wetting. Secondary enuresis can be caused by emotional stress or a medical condition, such as a bladder infection.

==== Psychological definition ====
Psychologists are usually allowed to diagnose and write a prescription for diapers if nocturnal enuresis causes the patient significant distress. Psychiatrists may instead use a definition from the DSM-IV, defining nocturnal enuresis as repeated urination into bed or clothes, occurring twice per week or more for at least three consecutive months in a child of at least 5 years of age and not due to either a drug side effect or a medical condition.

== Management ==
There are a number of management options for bedwetting. The following options apply when the bedwetting is not caused by a specifically identifiable medical condition such as a bladder abnormality or diabetes. Treatment is recommended when there is a specific medical condition such as bladder abnormalities, infection, or diabetes. It is also considered when bedwetting may harm the child's self-esteem or relationships with family/friends. Only a small percentage of bedwetting is caused by a specific medical condition, so most treatment is prompted by concern for the child's emotional welfare. Behavioral treatment of bedwetting overall tends to show increased self-esteem for children.

Parents become concerned much earlier than doctors. A study in 1980 asked parents and physicians the age that children should stay dry at night. The average parent response was 2.75 years old, while the average physician response was 5.13 years old.

Punishment is not effective and can interfere with treatment.

=== Treatment approaches ===
Simple behavioral methods are recommended as initial treatment. Other treatment methods include the following:

- Motivational therapy in nocturnal enuresis mainly involves parent and child education. Guilt should be allayed by providing facts. Fluids should be restricted 2 hours prior to bed. The child should be encouraged to empty the bladder completely prior to going to bed. Positive reinforcement can be initiated by setting up a diary or chart to monitor progress and establishing a system to reward the child for each night that they are dry. The child should participate in morning cleanup as a natural, nonpunitive consequence of wetting. This method is particularly helpful in younger children (<8 years) and will achieve dryness in 15-20% of the patients.
- Waiting: Almost all children will outgrow bedwetting. For this reason, urologists and pediatricians frequently recommend delaying treatment until the child is at least six or seven years old. Physicians may begin treatment earlier if they perceive the condition is damaging the child's self-esteem and/or relationships with family/friends.
- Bedwetting alarms: Physicians also frequently suggest bedwetting alarms which sound a loud tone when they sense moisture. This can help condition the child to wake at the sensation of a full bladder. These alarms are considered more effectivethan no treatment and may have a lower risk of adverse events than some medical therapies but it is still uncertain if alarms are more effective than other treatments. There may be a 29% to 69% relapse rate, so the treatment may need to be repeated.
- DDAVP (desmopressin) tablets are a synthetic replacement for antidiuretic hormone, the hormone that reduces urine production during sleep. Desmopressin is usually used in the form of desmopressin acetate, DDAVP. Patients taking DDAVP are 4.5 times more likely to stay dry than those taking a placebo. The drug replaces the hormone for that night with no cumulative effect. US drug regulators have banned using desmopressin nasal sprays for treating bedwetting since the oral form is considered safer.
- DDAVP is most efficient in children with nocturnal polyuria (nocturnal urine production greater than 130% of expected bladder capacity for age) and normal bladder reservoir function (maximum voided volume greater than 70% of expected bladder capacity for age). Other children who are likely candidates for desmopressin treatment are those in whom alarm therapy has failed or those considered unlikely to comply with alarm therapy. It can be very useful for summer camp and sleepovers to prevent enuresis.
- Tricyclic antidepressants: Tricyclic antidepressant prescription drugs with anti-muscarinic properties have been proven successful in treating bedwetting, but also have an increased risk of side effects, including death from overdose. These drugs include amitriptyline, imipramine and nortriptyline. Studies find that patients using these drugs are 4.2 times as likely to stay dry as those taking a placebo. The relapse rates after stopping the medicines are close to 50%.

=== Condition management ===
- Diapers: Wearing a diaper can reduce embarrassment for bedwetters and make cleanup easier for caregivers. These products are known as training pants or diapers when used for younger children, and as absorbent underwear or incontinence briefs when marketed for older children and adults. Some diapers are marketed especially for people with bedwetting. A major benefit is the reduced stress on both the bedwetter and caregivers. Wearing diapers can be especially beneficial for bedwetting children wishing to attend sleepovers or campouts, reducing emotional problems caused by social isolation and/or embarrassment in front of peers. According to a study of one adult with severe disabilities, extended diaper usage may interfere with learning to stay dry.

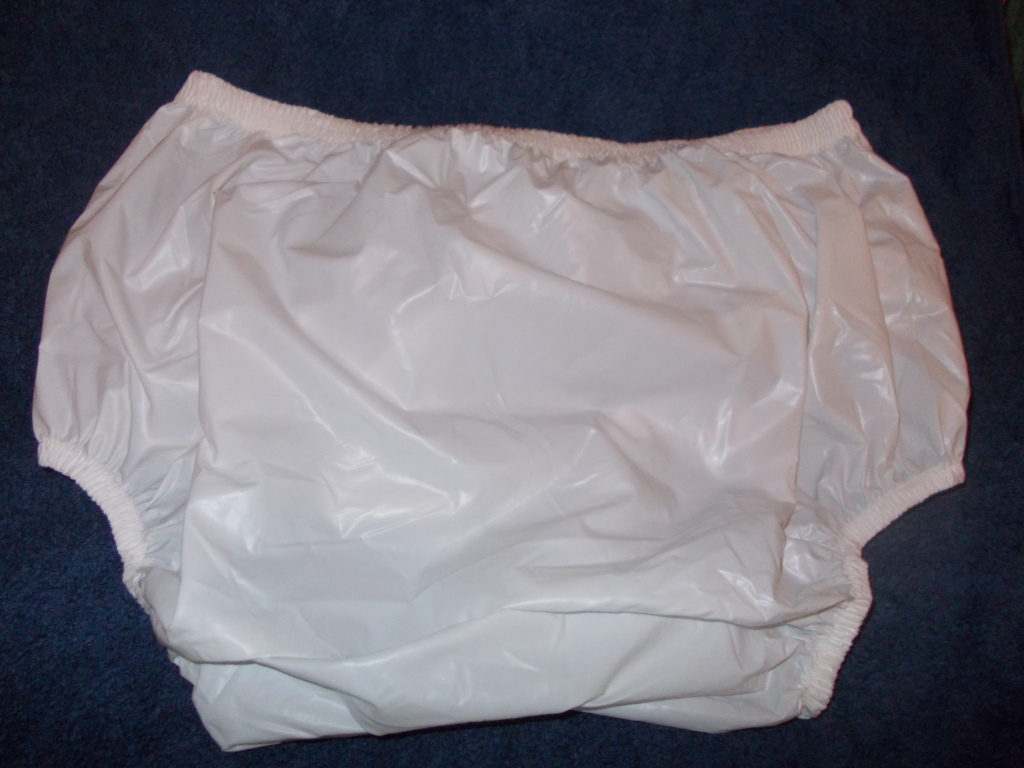
Plastic pants suitable for nocturnal enuresis in larger child or small adult

- Waterproof mattress pads are used in some cases to ease clean-up of bedwetting incidents, however they only protect the mattress, and the sheets, bedding or sleeping partner may be soiled.

=== Unproven ===
- Acupuncture: While acupuncture is safe in most adolescents, studies done to assess its effectiveness for nocturnal enuresis are of low quality.
- Dry bed training: Dry bed training is frequently waking the child at night. Studies show this training is ineffective by itself and does not increase the success rate when used in conjunction with a bedwetting alarm.
- Star chart: A star chart allows a child and parents to track dry nights, as a record and/or as part of a reward program. This can be done either alone or with other treatments. There is no research to show effectiveness, either in reducing bedwetting or in helping self-esteem. Some psychologists, however, recommend star charts as a way to celebrate successes and help a child's self-esteem.

== Epidemiology ==
Doctors frequently consider bedwetting as a self-limiting problem, since most children will outgrow it. Children 5 to 9 years old have a spontaneous cure rate of 14% per year. Adolescents 10 to 17 years old have a spontaneous cure rate of 16% per year.

As can be seen from the numbers above, a portion of bedwetting children will not outgrow the problem. While most children outgrow bedwetting by the age of 17 or sooner, not all children do and may continue into adulthood. Adult rates of bedwetting show little change due to spontaneous cure. Persons who are still enuretic at age 17 are likely to deal with bedwetting throughout their lives.

Studies of bedwetting in adults have found varying rates. The most quoted study in this area was done in the Netherlands. It found a 0.5% rate for 20- to 79-year-olds. A Hong Kong study, however, found a much higher rate. The Hong Kong researchers found a bedwetting rate of 2.3% in 16- to 40-year-olds.

== History ==
In the first century B.C., at lines 1026–29 of the fourth book of his On the Nature of Things, Lucretius gave a high-style description of bed-wetting:

"Innocent children often, when they are bound up by sleep, believe they are raising up their clothing by a latrine or shallow pot; they pour out the urine from their whole body, and the Babylonian bedding with its magnificent splendor is soaked."

An early psychological perspective on bedwetting was given in 1025 by Avicenna in The Canon of Medicine:

"Urinating in bed is frequently predisposed by deep sleep: when urine begins to flow, its inner nature and hidden will (resembling the will to breathe) drives urine out before the child awakes. When children become stronger and more robust, their sleep is lighter and they stop urinating."

Psychological theory through the 1960s placed much greater focus on the possibility that a bedwetting child might be acting out, purposefully striking back against parents by soiling linens and bedding. However, more recent research and medical literature states that this is very rare.

== See also ==
- Enuresis
- Nocturnal emission
