= Macdonald triad =

Set of behavioral characteristics

The Macdonald triad (also known as the triad of sociopathy or the homicidal triad) is a set of three factors, the presence of any two of which are considered to be predictive of, or associated with, violent tendencies, particularly with relation to serial offenses. The triad was first proposed by psychiatrist J. M. Macdonald in "The Threat to Kill", a 1963 article in the American Journal of Psychiatry, followed by his doctoral thesis submitted to the University of Otago in 1964. Small-scale studies conducted by psychiatrists Daniel Hellman and Nathan Blackman, and then FBI agents John E. Douglas and Robert K. Ressler along with Ann Burgess, claimed substantial evidence for the association of these childhood patterns with later predatory behavior. Although it remains an influential and widely taught hypothesis, subsequent research has generally not validated this line of thinking.

The triad links cruelty to animals, obsession with fire-setting, and persistent bedwetting past the age of five, to violent behaviors, particularly homicidal behavior and sexually predatory behavior.

Further studies have suggested that these behaviors are actually more linked to childhood experience of parental neglect, brutality, or abuse. Some argue this in turn results in "homicidal proneness." The "triad" concept as a particular combination of behaviors linked to violence may not have any particular validity; It has been called an urban legend.

== Arson ==
Arson or fire-setting is theorized to be a less severe or first shot at releasing aggression. Extensive periods of humiliation have been found to be present in the childhoods of several adult serial killers. These repetitive episodes of humiliation can lead to feelings of frustration and anger, which need to somehow be released in order to return to a normal state of self-worth. However, the triad combination has been questioned in this regard also, and a review has suggested that this behavior is just one that can occur in the context of childhood antisocial behavior and is not necessarily predictive of later violence.

== Cruelty to animals ==
FBI special agent Alan Brantly believed that some offenders kill animals as a rehearsal for killing human victims. Cruelty to animals is mainly used to vent frustration and anger the same way firesetting is. Extensive amounts of humiliation were also found in the childhoods of children who engaged in acts of cruelty to animals. During childhood, serial killers could not retaliate toward those who caused them humiliation, so they chose animals because they were viewed as weak and vulnerable. Future victim selection is already in the process at a young age. Studies have found that those who engaged in childhood acts of cruelty to animals used the same method of killing on their human victims as they did on their animal victims.

Wright and Hensley (2003) named three recurring themes in their study of five cases of serial murderers: As children, they vented their frustrations because the person causing them anger or humiliation was too powerful to take down; they felt as if they regained some control and power over their lives through the torture and killing of animals; they gained the power and control they desired by causing pain and suffering of a weaker, more vulnerable animal – escalating to humans in the future.

In a study of 45 male prison inmates who were deemed violent offenders, McClellan (2007) found that 56% admitted to having committed acts of violence against animals. It was also found that children who abused animals were more often the victims of parental abuse than children who did not abuse animals.

In a 2004 study, which considered not one-off events but patterns of repeat violence, Tallichet and Hensley found a link between repeated animal cruelty and violence against humans. They examined prisoners in maximum or medium security prisons. However, overgeneralizing possible links between animal violence and human violence can have unwanted consequences such as detracting focus from other possible predictors or causes.

== Enuresis ==
Enuresis is "unintentional bed-wetting during sleep, persistent after the age of five." The bed-wetting must continue twice a week for at least three consecutive months.

Bedwetting into the tween and teen years has also been used as an indicator of possible childhood sexual abuse. Enuresis, firesetting, and cruelty to animals are more likely indicators of sustained physical or emotional abuse toward the child, or underlying mental illness that will, in turn, cause those behaviors. One researcher notes that enuresis is an "unconscious, involuntary, and nonviolent act and therefore linking it to violent crime is more problematic than doing so with animal cruelty or firesetting."

== See also ==
- Dark triad
- Personality development disorder
- Psychopathy
- Zoosadism
