= Clara Ward (disambiguation) =

Clara Ward may refer to:

- Clara Ward (1924–1973), American gospel singer, arranger, and bandleader of The Famous Ward Singers
- Clara Ward (1912–1948), American socialite and murder victim of Charles Starkweather
- Clara Ward, Princesse de Caraman-Chimay (1873–1916), American-born stage performer, Belgian princess and courtesan
