= Section 8 (military) =

Category of US military discharge

Section 8 was a category of military discharge employed by the United States Armed Forces which was used for servicemembers judged mentally unfit for service. The term "Section 8" eventually came to mean any service member given such a discharge, or behaving as if deserving such a discharge, as in the expression, "he's a Section 8".

This type of discharge could be granted for a wide variety of perceived problems, including low intelligence, incompatibility with core military expectations or responsibilities, alcoholism or other chronic addictions, pathological lying, psychopathy, personality disorders, enuresis (then believed to be a mental disorder), psychosis or antisocial behavior. A variety of sexual conduct could result in a Section 8 discharge, including cross-dressing, homosexuality, lesbianism, bisexuality and transgenderism; along with necrophilia, bestiality and pederasty.

== History ==
The term comes from Section VIII of the World War II–era United States Army Regulation 615–360, concerning the separation of enlisted men from military service. Section VIII provided for the discharge of men who were deemed mentally unfit for military service.

A Section 8 discharge was generally honorable, but could also be without honor (not to be confused with dishonorable discharge) when issued due to "psychopathic behavior", "chronic alcoholism", or "sexual perversion", including homosexuality. Section 8 discharges for homosexuality were usually without honor, which often made it difficult to find work in civilian life and did not confer veterans benefits.

Discharge under Section 8 is no longer practiced, as medical discharges for psychological or psychiatric reasons are now covered by a number of regulations. In the Army, such discharges are handled under the provisions of AR 635–200, Active Duty Enlisted Administrative Separations. Chapter 5, paragraph 13 governs the separation of personnel medically diagnosed with a personality disorder.

== In popular culture ==
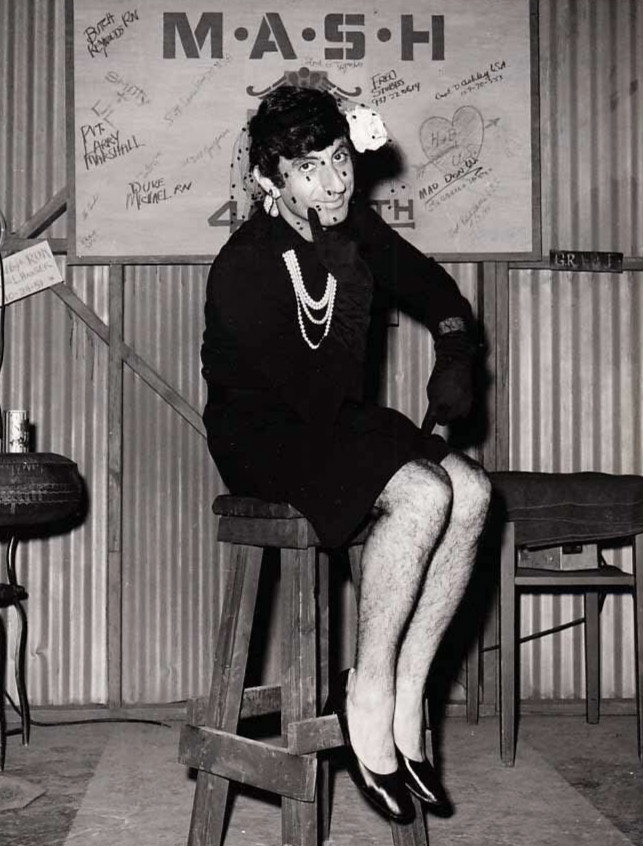
Corporal Klinger (played by Jamie Farr) of the TV series M*A*S*H

- In the 1959 war novel A Separate Peace, the character Elwin "Leper" Lepellier gets a Section 8 discharge from the ski troops because he was hallucinating due to sleep deprivation.
- Section 8 became a household phrase when used in the 1970s TV series M*A*S*H, in which the character Corporal Klinger was continually seeking one but his efforts were denied due to his transparent malingering and until he eventually abandoned his efforts. His preferred method of doing so was cross-dressing, but other attempts included threatening to set himself on fire and consuming a Jeep piece by piece.
- In Stanley Kubrick's 1987 film Full Metal Jacket, the character of Pvt. Leonard "Gomer Pyle" Lawrence (Vincent D'Onofrio) is described as potentially being a Section 8 when it is noticed that he talks to his rifle, and another rifleman in the Lusthog Squad, aptly named Hand Job, was sent to a Navy psychologist due to excessive masturbation (as Cowboy put it, "jerking off 10 times a day") and was instantly classified as a Section 8 after he started masturbating in the waiting room.
- In the 1993 film Cliffhanger, the character Travis goes rogue, saying "I've gone full fucking Section 8!"
- In the 1998 film When Trumpets Fade, the character Private David Manning tried to avoid combat by asking for Section 8 from his company commander, Captain Roy Pritchett, but he was promoted to Sergeant instead. Later on, Pritchett offers Manning a Section 8 discharge if he volunteers and succeeds in taking out a German 88 battery.
- In the 2003 movie Basic, a DEA agent Tom Hardy (John Travolta) investigates a group of apparently insane mercenary Rangers turned drug dealers calling themselves Section 8.
- In the 2007 video game Halo 3, the marine allies will occasionally ask the player if they have 'gone Section 8' if they shoot them. If the player kills too many of them, one may yell 'He's gone Section 8!' and start shooting the player back.
- The 2009 video game Section 8 was named after the military term due to its game mechanics of "dangerously insane" orbital flights.
- American deathcore band Whitechapel featured a song called "Section 8" on their self-titled album from 2012.
- In the 2019 video game Call of Duty: Modern Warfare, the character Sgt. Wayne Dylan Davis ("D-Day") is given a Section 8 discharge after the failed rescue attempt of a teammate.
- In the 2022 film Section Eight, a group of discharged soldiers become secret assassins.

== Notable examples ==
During World War II, in November 1943, at age 17, actor Sidney Poitier lied about his age and enlisted in the Army. He was assigned to a Veteran's Administration hospital in Northport, New York, and was trained to work with psychiatric patients. Poitier became upset with how the hospital treated its patients and feigned mental illness to obtain a discharge. Poitier confessed to a psychiatrist that he was faking his condition, but the doctor was sympathetic and granted his discharge under Section VIII of Army regulation 615–360 in December 1944.

== See also ==
- Blue discharge
- Don't ask, don't tell
