= Rigójancsi =

Hungarian chocolate cake

Rigó Jancsi
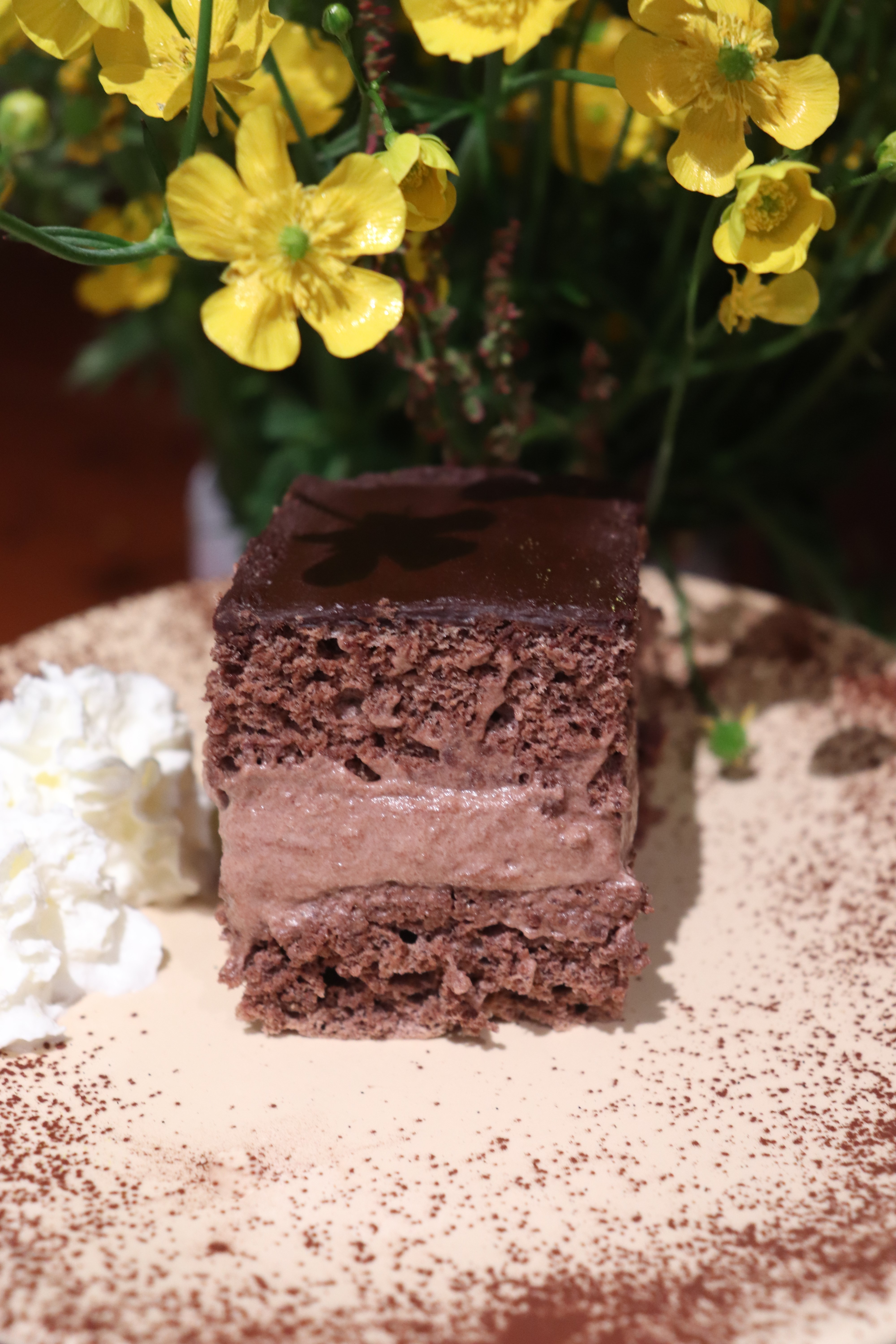
- Alternative names: Gypsy John
- Type: Cake
- Place of origin: Hungary and Austria
- Region or state: in Hungary: nationwide in Austria: Vienna in Italy: Trieste in Croatia: Rijeka
- Main ingredients: Chocolate sponge cake (flour, butter, sugar, egg whites, chocolate, egg yolks); Filling: chocolate and cream icing, apricot jam, dark rum or vanilla

Rigójancsi (Hungarian pronunciation: [ˈriɡoː ˈjɒnt͡ʃi]) is a traditional Hungarian cube-shaped chocolate sponge cake and chocolate cream pastry. It gained popularity in the former Austria-Hungary and is named after Rigó Jancsi (1858–1927), a famous Hungarian Gypsy (Romani people) violinist.

In Flavors of Hungary, a cookbook written by Charlotte Slovak Biro, this cake is called "Gypsy John".

== History ==
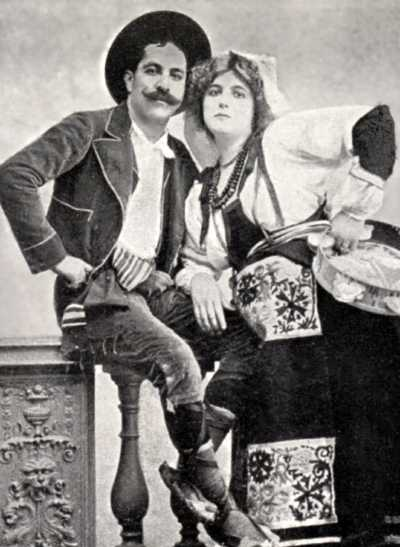
Clara Ward and her second husband, Rigó Jancsi, on a German postcard from about 1905

Clara Ward, Princesse de Caraman-Chimay and Jancsi met in 1896, while Rigo Jancsi played violin at a Paris restaurant, where Clara dined out with her husband, Prince Joseph. Between 1896 and 1898, newspapers wrote extensively about the marriage of the primás (first violinist) Jancsi Rigó to the Belgian countess. The cake is a celebration cake wearing Rigó Jancsi's name and in honor of the romantic love story.

Sources do not agree about the origin of the pastry. Some claim that Rigo created the pastry together with an unknown pastry chef to surprise Clara; others claim that Rigó Jancsi brought this pastry to Clara and the confectioner named it afterwards Rigó Jancsi.

== The cake ==
The cake has two layers of chocolate-sponge cake. These chocolate sponge cake layers are made with beaten egg whites, molten chocolate, butter, sugar and flour. Sugar creamed egg yolks are beaten into the mixture.

Between the two chocolate sponge cake layers is a thick layer of very rich, chocolate and cream filling, and a very thin apricot jam layer. The filling may include a touch of dark rum and/or vanilla. The cake is covered with a dark chocolate fondant glaze.

== See also ==
- List of foods named after people
- Portland vice scandal - for the historical person Rigó Jancsi (1858–1927)

== Bibliography ==
- Gundel's Hungarian Cookbook, Karoly Gundel, Budapest, CORVINA. ISBN 963-13-3733-2
