= Bedwetting alarm =

Behavioral treatment for nocturnal enuresis

A bedwetting alarm is a behavioral treatment for nocturnal enuresis.

== History ==
The enuresis alarm methodology originated from French and German physicians in the first decade of the 20th century. Meinhard von Pfaundler, a German pediatrician made the discovery accidentally, with the original intention to create an alarm device that would notify nursing staff when a child had bed wetting and needed to be changed, showing the device to have a significant therapeutic advantages after a certain time of use. Despite early success, the treatment was not developed until the 1930s by two independent groups of psychologists: Orval Mowrer and Willie Mae Mowrer (1938) and John Morgan and Frances Witmer (1939). Mowrer used a modified Pfaundler alarm device with 30 children (ages 3–13 years) showing empirical success of the bell and pad method as a treatment for nocturnal enuresis, with the maximum time required to accomplish the treatment not exceeding two months.

== Treatment process ==
The individual places the sensor (usually located in briefs or underwear) and turns the alarm device on (there are various types of alarms) before going to sleep. The enuresis alarm is triggered when a sensor in the sheets or night clothes becomes wet with urine, setting off an auditory signal with the intention of causing the individual to wake, cease voiding, and arise to void. Parents are advised to wake their child when the alarm is activated—otherwise, children are prone to turn it off and go back to sleep.

It is highly suggested that during treatment the alarm should be worn every night. The treatment effect and response are not immediate and treatment should be continued for 2–3 months or until the child is dry for 14 consecutive nights (whichever comes first). There may be cultural differences in its acceptability, as it may be highly disruptive for the household and may require a significant commitment of time and effort. The family must be motivated and adhere to this therapy if it is to be successful so they should be preemptively apprised of likely difficulties, but assured the first few weeks are the most troublesome. If necessary, doctors should monitor the child's progress early to address any problems and facilitate adherence.

== Conditioning ==
The enuresis alarm utilizes both classical and operant conditioning to provide a means of causing the sleeping individual to be regularly awakened immediately after the onset of urination so they can void in the toilet and prevent bed wetting.

=== Classical conditioning ===
The classical conditioning paradigm components for the bell and pad method are the following: The unconditioned stimulus (US) is the awakening stimulus or the alarm sound, the unconditioned response (UR) is the awakening response and sphincter contraction, the neutral stimulus (NS) is the feeling produced by bladder distention (feeling of having a full bladder), the conditioned stimulus (CS) is the feeling produced by bladder distention, and the conditioned response (CR) is the awakening response and sphincter contraction. Initially the individual experiences the alarm sounding (activated by urination) (US) eliciting the awakening response and sphincter contraction (UR) to wake up, stop urinating, and travel to the bathroom. After continued pairing of the alarm sound (US) with the feeling of a full bladder (NS), the previous NS of feeling a full bladder becomes the CS and elicits the waking response (CR) of waking up to go use the bathroom and urinate.

=== Operant conditioning ===
In the operant conditioning paradigm the alarm sound serves as a noxious stimuli added to the environment, effectively implementing a positive punishment procedure whenever the individual activates the alarm by urinating. This eventually causes an avoidance response from the individual, maintain the behavior through negative reinforcement by avoiding the alarm sound altogether. In the future the individual wakes up to urinate and avoids wetting the bed.

=== Conditioning theory dissonance ===
Most researchers of the enuresis alarm credit the treatment effect to the classical conditioning paradigm as was explained in the original research by Mowrer. However, some researchers have noted an important difference between conditioning treatment and the usual classical conditioning treatment. In typical classical conditioning, when the unconditioned stimulus is withdrawn, the conditioned response gradually weakens with repeated application of the conditioned stimulus. In successful cases of the enuresis alarm conditioning treatment, no extinction occurs following the withdrawal of the alarm stimulus (US). This suggests that the conditioning treatment may follow the operant avoidance conditioning rather than the classical conditioning pattern. In addition, a strictly classical conditioning explanation fails to incorporate that social positive reinforcement may be introduced to the individuals environment from family members from signs of improvement taking into account social learning. However, it is theorized that classical and operant conditioning both contribute to the effectiveness of the treatment.

== Sensors ==
A urine sensor is a necessary part of any bedwetting alarm. A basic urine sensor consists of two electricity conductors separated by moisture absorbing insulating material. A low DC electric voltage, provided by batteries, is applied across these conductors. This low voltage is usually about 3 volts, so as not to be dangerous to the user. When this insulating material (frequently cotton cloth as in common briefs) absorbs urine, it allows electricity to pass through it and between the conductors, resulting in a small electric current in the conductors. The conductors are attached to an alarm device, which triggers an alarm when it senses this current. Most sensors and alarms are engineered based on this concept. Note that unless the urine reaches the sensor mechanism and adequately wets the briefs (or insulator between the conductors), the urine may not be sensed and the alarm will not activate.

Sensors are usually classified in terms of their attachment mechanisms to the briefs or other urine absorbing medium. The major sensor attachment categories are mechanical clips, sticky tape or pads for flat surface sensors, magnetic attachment, and wiring sewed into special briefs.

Stainless steel clips are most often used and are easily attached and detached to the briefs at the point of urination. Flat surface sensors require sticky tape or pads to be attached to the briefs. The magnetic sensors are magnetically attached to the briefs. Magnetic sensors and wired briefs are typically used for wireless alarms.

Another consideration is how the sensor (through its cable, if applicable) is attached to its alarm or transmitter in the case of wired alarms or wireless alarms. Some wireless alarms are truly wireless, with the transmitter being part of the sensor and completely self-contained. For wired alarms, the sensor's wire (or cable) runs from the sensor (located at the point of urination) underneath the user's pajama shirt to wherever the alarm is located on the body (frequently on the collar of the pajama shirt, so that it is close to the ear). The attachment mechanism to the alarm, through which the electric current flows to the alarm, is important. If it is easily detached (unintentionally comes out from the alarm during use) the alarm may not be triggered. Most connectors are plastic telephone jacks which are very unlikely to be detached unintentionally (RJ-11, RJ-12, 616E, etc.).

== Types of alarms ==
=== Wearable alarms ===
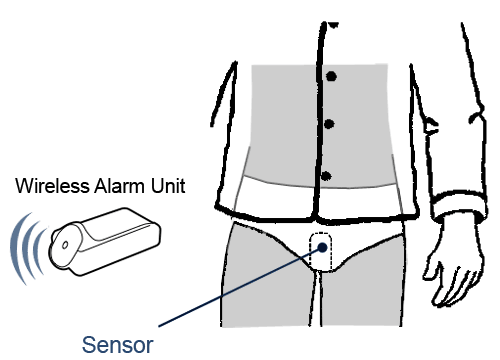
Wireless Bedwetting Alarm

A wearable alarm is a design in which the child or patient wears the moisture sensor in or on their underwear or pajamas. This type of sensor will detect moisture almost immediately. The sensor is attached to the alarm unit with an electricity conducting wire or cable that can be worn under the shirt. Many wearable alarms vibrate as well as sound to wake deep sleepers.

=== Wireless alarms ===
A wireless bedwetting alarm is one in which the sensor and the alarm unit communicate by a means other than a wire. The transmitter, which senses the moisture, is directly attached to the child's underwear. The signal is transmitted wirelessly to a unit that is across the room from the child or an alarm unit in the child's room. Once the alarm unit is activated, it is necessary to get out of bed to turn it off. New wireless alarms add the convenience of also sounding an alarm in the caregiver's room, allowing both patient and caregiver to sleep in the comfort and privacy of their own beds and rooms. Multiple alarms in the house can further increase convenience. Remote controls can facilitate using the wireless bedwetting alarm system, and be especially convenient for the parent or caregiver.

=== Pad-type alarms ===
Bell-and pad alarms do not attach to the child in any way. The moisture sensor is in the form of a pad or mat that the child sleeps on top of. The pad detects moisture after urine has leaked onto it. The alarm unit is connected with a cord and usually sits on the bedside stand. This alarm requires a larger amount of urine before the sensor can detect moisture. The person must be on the pad for it to sense moisture.

== Factors of treatment success ==
Successful outcome of enuresis alarm treatment is associated with optimal motivation of the child and family, higher frequency of dry nights, and the absence of adverse environmental factors and psychiatric disorders. Reduced efficacy of the treatment is associated with lack of concern shown by the individual, lack of supervision, inconsistent use, family stress, abnormal scores on behavioral checklists, psychiatric disorders in the individual, failure to awaken in response to the alarm, unsatisfactory housing conditions, and more than one wetting episode per night.
