= Lionel Deane =

American architect (1861–1938)

Lionel D. Deane (1861–1938) was an architect in the United States and later part of Brooklyn, New York's art scene. He was born in Nova Scotia, Canada. He is known for his architectural work in northern California and the Pacific Northwest. His career took a hit when he was caught up in a crackdown against Portland's Gay community in 1912 (Portland vice scandal).

Deane was born in Nova Scotia, Canada in 1861. He was brought to the U.S. at age five in 1866.

His early work includes a Dominican monastery. He moved to Portland, Oregon in 1889 and was a draftsman for Justus Krumbein until 1892. In 1893 he started his own practice. He partnered with James Kollofrath in San Francisco from 1899 to 1903. In 1906 he was part of rebuilding efforts in San Francisco after the devastating earthquake and fires.

Deane returned to Portland in 1911 to work on the Washington Hotel at 1135 S.W. Washington, now the Washington Apartments. Deane was arrested with other men in Portland in November 1912 and prosecuted for homosexuality before charges were dropped for lack of evidence. Deane was listed in the Portland City directory of 1912 as the keeper of the saloon, which was also operated as a Gay bar in the 1970s.

Deane eventually moved to New York City and seems to have taken been painting and part of the art community of Brooklyn.

== Works ==
- Perkins Hotel (1891)
- St. Vincent's Hospital
- Gilbert Building
- A. O. U. W. Temple (1892)
- Dome of the State Capitol in Salem
