= Personality development disorder =

A personality development disorder is an inflexible and pervasive pattern of inner experience and behavior in children and adolescents, that markedly deviates from the expectations of the individual's culture.

Personality development disorder is not recognized as a mental disorder in any of the medical manuals, such as the ICD-10 or the DSM-IV, nor the more recent DSM-5. DSM-IV allows the diagnosis of personality disorders in children and adolescents only as an exception. This diagnosis is currently proposed by a few authors in Germany. The term personality development disorder is used to emphasize the changes in personality development which might still take place and the open outcome during development. Personality development disorder is considered to be a childhood risk factor or early stage of a later personality disorder in adulthood.

Adults usually show personality patterns over a long duration of time. Children and adolescents however still show marked changes in personality development. Some of these children and adolescents have a hard time developing their personalities in an ordinary way. DSM-IV states, for example, that children and adolescents are at higher risk to develop an antisocial personality disorder if they showed signs of conduct disorder and attention deficit disorder before the age of 10. This led Adam & Breithaupt-Peters (2010) to the idea that these children and adolescents need to be looked at more carefully. The therapy which these children and adolescents need might be more intense and maybe even different from looking at the disorders traditionally. The concept of personality development disorders also focuses on the severity of the disorder and the poor prognosis. An early diagnosis might help to get the right treatment at an early stage and thus might help to prevent a personality disorder outcome in adulthood.

== Description ==
Similar to the adult diagnosis personality disorder these children display enduring patterns of inner experience and behavior deviating markedly from the expectations of the individual's culture. These patterns are inflexible and pervasive across a broad range of personal and social situations, lead to clinically significant distress or impairment in social, occupational or other important areas of functioning, and they are stable and of long duration (more than a year).

The term personality development disorder (Persönlichkeitsentwicklungsstörung) was first used in German by Spiel & Spiel (1987). Adam & Breithaupt-Peters (2010) adapted the term to a more modern concept and suggested the following definition.

== Cause ==
Similar to adult personality disorders there are multiple causes and causal interactions for personality development disorders. In clinical practice it is important to view the disorder multi-perspectively and from an individual perspective. Biological and neurological causes need to be observed just as much as psychosocial factors. Looking at the disorder from only one perspective (e.g. (s)he had a bad childhood) often results in ignorance of important other factors or causal interactions. This might be one of the main reasons why traditional treatment methods often fail with these disorders. Only a multi-perspective view can provide for a multi-dimensional treatment approach which seems to be the key for these disorders.

=== Possible causes ===
- Genetics (researchers have begun identifying some genetic factors behind personality disorders.)
- Childhood trauma
- Verbal abuse
- High reactivity
- Peers

=== Possible risk factors ===
Personality development and personality disorders causes are unknown till present day but certain factors (such as family history, abusive history, family chaotic relationships during childhood or present, differences in brain chemistry and construction) can trigger the development of personality traits.'

== Diagnosis ==
The diagnosis personality development disorder should only be given carefully and after a longer period of evaluation. A thorough diagnostic evaluation is also necessary. Parents should be questioned separately and together with the child or adolescent to evaluate the severity and duration of the problems. In addition, standardized personality tests might be helpful. It is also useful to ask the family what treatment approaches they have already tried so far without success.

Symptoms: types of personality disorders are grouped differently depending on the thinking and personality perception. There are 3 different personality clusters: Cluster A, Cluster B and Cluster C.

- Cluster A personality disorders are characterized by odd and uncommon thinking or behavior. This includes paranoid personality disorder, schizoid personality disorder and schizotypal personality disorder.
- Cluster B : Disorders are distinguished by overly emotional behavior leading up to unpredictable thinking/behavior, and being overly dramatic. This cluster includes antisocial personality disorder, borderline personality disorder, histrionic personality disorder, and narcissistic personality disorder.
- Cluster C : Disorders are identified by fearful and anxious behavior. Cluster C includes avoidant personality disorder, dependent personality disorder, and obsessive-compulsive personality disorder.

Diagnosis: If a medical provider believes a patient might have a personality development disorder, they might provide a physical and/or recommend a psychiatric evaluation. (Diagnostic criteria from DSM)

=== Definition ===
According to Adam and Breithaupt-Peters personality development disorders are defined as complex disorders

- which show similarity to a certain type of personality disorder in adulthood
- which persist over a long period of time (more than a year) and show a tendency towards being chronic
- which have a severe negative impact on more than one important area of functioning or social life
- which show resistance to traditional educational and therapeutic treatment methods
- which result in a reduced insight into or ignorance of the own problem behavior.
- which make positive interactions between the children/adolescents and other people impossible. Instead, social collisions are part of everyday life.
- which threaten the social integration of the young person into a social life and might result in an emotional disability.

== Treatment ==
Personality development disorders usually need a complex and multi-dimensional treatment approach (Adam & Breithaupt-Peters, 2010). Since the problems are complex, treatment needs to affect the conditions in all impaired functional and social areas. Both educational and therapeutic methods are helpful and problem and strength based approaches work hand in hand. Parents need to be included as well as the school environment. Treatment methods need to be flexible and adjustable to the individual situation. Even elements of social work can be helpful when supporting the families and in some cases medication might be necessary. When suicidal behaviors or self-injuries are prominent treatment might best be done in a hospital.

For some personality development disorders (e.g. borderline personality disorder) treatment methods from adults can be adapted (e.g. dialectical behavior therapy, Miller et al., 2006).

== See also ==
- Macdonald triad
- Personality development
- Personality disorder

== Literature ==
- Bleiberg, E. (2004). Treating Personality Disorders in Children and Adolescents: A Relational Approach. New York, NY: Guildford Press. (ISBN 978-1593850180)
- Freeman, A. (2007). Personality Disorders in Childhood and Adolescence. Hoboken, NJ: Wiley. (ISBN 978-0471683049)
- Kernberg, P.; Weiner, A. & Bardenstein, K. (2000). Personality Disorders in Children and Adolescents. New York, NY: Basic Books. (ISBN 978-0465095629)
- Miller, A.; Rathus, J.; Linehan, M. & Swenson, C. (2006). Dialectical Behavior Therapy with Suicidal Adolescents. New York, NY: Guilford Press (ISBN 978-1593853839)
- Spiel, W. & Spiel, G. (1987). Kompendium der Kinder- und Jugendneuropsychiatrie. München, Basel: Ernst Reinhard.
- Versonnen, F. & Tuinier, S. (2008). From personality disorder towards personality development disorders. European Psychiatry, Volume 23, Supplement 2, S98 (16th AEP Congress - Abstract book, 16th AEP Congress).
- https://www.mayoclinic.org/diseases-conditions/personality-disorders/symptoms-causes/syc-20354463#:~:text=Personality%20forms%20during%20childhood%2C%20shaped,are%20sometimes%20called%20your%20temperament. https://www.apa.org/topics/personality-disorders/causes
