= Diurnal enuresis =

- Specialty: Pediatrics

Diurnal enuresis is daytime wetting (functional daytime urinary incontinence). Nocturnal enuresis is nighttime wetting. Enuresis is defined as the involuntary voiding of urine beyond the age of anticipated control. Both of these conditions can occur at the same time, although many children with nighttime wetting will not have wetting during the day. Children with daytime wetting may have frequent urination, have urgent urination or dribble after urinating.

The DSM-5 classifies enuresis as an elimination disorder and as such it may be defined as the involuntary or voluntary elimination of urine into inappropriate places. A patient must be of at least a developmental level equivalent to the chronological age of a 5 year old in order to be diagnosed with enuresis (in other words it is not abnormal for a child below the age of 5).

The patient must either experience a frequency of inappropriate voiding at least twice a week for a period of at least 3 consecutive months OR experience clinically significant distress or impairment in social, occupational or other important areas of functioning, in order to be diagnosed with enuresis. These symptoms must not be due to any underlying medical condition (e.g. a child who wets the bed because their kidneys produce too much urine, does not have enuresis, they have kidney disease which is causing the inappropriate urination). Also, these symptoms must not be due exclusively to the direct physiological effect of a substance (such as a diuretic or antipsychotic).

== Causes ==
Common causes include, but not limited to:

- Incomplete emptying of the bladder
- Irritable bladder
- Constipation
- Stress
- Urinary tract infection
- Urgency (not "making it" to the bathroom in time)
- Anatomic abnormality
- Poor toileting habits
- Small bladder capacity
- Medical conditions like overactive bladder disorder

== Management ==
Management approaches include reassuring families that the child is not wetting their pants on purpose and treatment should include positive reinforcement (not punishment). Non-invasive treatments include keeping a diary to track when the child does not make it to the bathroom on time, ruling out and treating urinary tract infections, ensuring the child is not constipated, hydration, timed voiding, correction of constipation, and in some cases, computer assisted pelvic floor retraining. The effectiveness of non-surgical and non-pharmaceutical interventions for treating children with daytime urinary incontinence is not clear. Bladder stretching exercises (where the person tries to hold their urine as long as possible) are no longer recommended. Bladder stretching exercises can be dangerous because the person could develop the long-term habit of tightening the urethral sphincter muscle, which can cause bladder or kidney problems. Urinating on a regular basis is suggested.

== Epidemiology ==
Daytime wetting is more common in girls, while bedwetting is three times as prevalent in boys (i.e., around 75% of those affected are male). At the age of 7 approximately 3% of girls and 2% of boys experience functional daytime wetting at least once a week.

== See also ==
- Urinary incontinence
- Toilet training
- Enuresis
