= John Macdonald (psychiatrist) =

New Zealand psychiatrist (1920–2007)

John Marshall Macdonald (9 November 1920 – 16 December 2007) was a forensic psychiatrist most renowned for his theory of the Macdonald triad of sociopathic traits and his profiling of serial killers. He published approximately a dozen books in his field.

Macdonald completed a Doctor of Medicine degree at the University of Otago in 1967, with a thesis titled The Threat to Kill.

== Bibliography ==
- The murderer and his victim (C. C. Thomas, 1961, ISBN 978-0-398-06254-5)
