= Blue discharge =

Form of administrative discharge from the US military

A blue discharge, also called blue ticket, was a form of administrative military discharge formerly issued by the United States from 1916 to 1947. It was intended as a discharge without honor, neither honorable nor dishonorable. The blue ticket became the discharge of choice for commanders seeking to remove homosexual service members from the ranks. They were also issued disproportionately to African Americans and Lebanese Americans.

Service members holding a blue discharge were subjected to discrimination in civilian life. They were denied the benefits of the G.I. Bill by the Veterans Administration and had difficulty finding work because employers were aware of the negative connotations of a blue discharge. Following intense criticism in the press – especially the black press, because of the high percentage of African Americans who received blue discharges – and in Congress, the blue discharge was discontinued in 1947, replaced by two new classifications: general and undesirable.

== History ==
The blue discharge was created in 1916 to replace two previous discharge classifications, the administrative discharge without honor and the "unclassified" discharge. The discharges were printed on blue paper, hence the name. They were also sometimes called "blue tickets". One early use of the blue discharge was for service members who had enlisted to fight in World War I while underage, but this practice was abolished by law and all such discharges were upgraded to honorable.

== Association with homosexuality ==
The United States military had a long-standing policy, in-line with prevailing laws and morality, that service members found to be homosexual or to have engaged in homosexual conduct were to be court-martialed for sodomy, imprisoned, and dishonorably discharged. However, with the mobilization of troops following the United States' entry into World War II, it became impractical to convene court-martial boards of commissioned officers, and some commanders began issuing administrative discharges instead. Several waves of reform addressing the handling of homosexuals in the military resulted in a 1944 policy directive that called for homosexuals to be committed to military hospitals, examined by psychiatrists, and discharged under Regulation 615-360, section 8 as "unfit for service". It is unknown exactly how many homosexual service members were given blue discharges under this regulation, but in 1946 the Army estimated that it had issued between 49,000 and 68,000 blue discharges, with approximately 5,000 of them issued to homosexuals, while the Navy's estimates of blue-discharge homosexuals was around 4,000. The period of time covered by these estimates is unclear.

The psychiatrists responsible for creating and implementing screening procedures to exclude homosexuals from military service initially supported blue discharges. However, when they learned of the difficulties that blue-ticket holders faced in civilian life, they urged the military to discontinue the practice. William C. Menninger, who served as the Director of the Psychiatry Consultants Division for the Surgeon General of the United States Army from 1944 to 1946, tried to persuade the military to issue honorable discharges to homosexual service members who had not committed any crimes during their military service.

One press account said the purpose of administrative blue discharges, "discharges which are not dishonorable but are based on habits or traits of the individual that make his continuation in service undesirable", was the need to return soldiers to civilian life as quickly as possible: "to get the non-disabled soldier back into the nation's economic life with as little delay and red tape as possible, and to help him solve his own personal problems such as unemployment, educational opportunities, or finances."

== Discrimination ==
The Veterans Administration (VA), charged with implementing the provisions of the G.I. Bill, denied benefits to blue-discharge veterans, despite the Bill's explicit language that made only a dishonorable discharge grounds for denying benefits to a veteran. In 1945, the VA issued a directive that all blue-discharges for homosexuality would be denied benefits. On December 22, 1955, the United States Court of Appeals for the District of Columbia Circuit denied an appeal from Raymond W. Longernecker, who had been denied his G.I. Bill benefits by the VA because of his blue discharge. The Court found that the VA had discretion in awarding benefits and that Congress had specifically foreclosed the courts from overruling it. Nevertheless, the Court noted that the denial of benefits should only have occurred if Longernecker had been dishonorably discharged and that the VA Administrator was acting without authority in treating a blue discharge as if it were dishonorable.

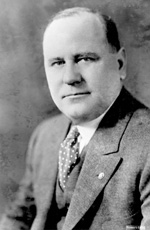
Senator Bennett Champ Clark, a sponsor of the G.I. Bill, supported benefits for soldiers with blue discharges.

Most employers required that job applicants who had served in the military present their discharge papers as part of the application process. Blue-discharge veterans experienced difficulty in securing employment because many employers were aware that the blue discharge meant that the holder was considered undesirable. Those employers who did not know had access to a list of the Separation Program Numbers ("spin numbers") that the military used to classify discharges. At least four such spin numbers indicated a discharge related to homosexuality.

Congress had expressed concern about possible misuse of the blue discharge when it began work on the G.I. Bill in 1944. In discussions about the legislation's details, the American Legion insisted on a specific provision to provide benefits to veterans discharged under any circumstance other than dishonorable. The Legion believed a large number of veterans had been given blue and other less-than-honorable discharges for reasons that it considered unreasonable or trivial. In testimony before the United States Senate, Rear Admiral Randall Jacobs strongly opposed this provision on the grounds that it would undermine morale and remove any incentive to maintain a good service record. Senator Bennett Champ Clark, a sponsor of the bill, dismissed his concerns, calling them "some of the most stupid, short-sighted objections which could be raised". Clark went on to say:

The Army is giving blue discharges, namely discharges without honor, to those who have had no fault other than they have not shown sufficient aptitude for military service. I say that when the government drafts a man from civil life and puts him in the military service ... and, thereafter, because the man does not show sufficient aptitude gives him a blue discharge, or a discharge without honor, that fact should not be permitted to prevent the man from receiving the benefits to which soldiers are generally entitled.

The G.I. Bill also provided for discharge review boards to review an appeal of any discharge other than dishonorable. From 1945 until early 1947, these boards routinely upgraded to honorable the blue discharges of homosexual service members who had not committed any known sex acts during their military service. About one-third of all blue discharges reviewed were upgraded to honorable.

== Black press criticism ==
Another minority group disproportionately issued blue discharges were African Americans: of the 48,603 blue discharges issued by the Army between December 1, 1941, and June 30, 1945, 10,806 were issued to African Americans, or 22.23% of all blue discharges, whereas African Americans constituted 6.5% of the Army at the relevant time.

In October 1945, Black-interest newspaper The Pittsburgh Courier launched an investigation against the discharge and its abuses, calling the discharge "a vicious instrument that should not be perpetrated against the American Soldier", and rebuked the Army for "allowing prejudiced officers to use it as a means of punishing Negro soldiers who do not like specifically unbearable conditions".

The Courier specifically noted the discrimination faced by homosexual blue-tickets, calling them "'unfortunates' of the Nation...being preyed upon by the blue discharge" and demanded to know "why the Army chooses to penalize these 'unfortunates' who seem most in need of Army benefits and the opportunity to become better citizens under the educational benefits of the GI Bill of Rights".

The Courier printed instructions on how to appeal a blue discharge, and warned readers against accepting a blue ticket out of the service because of the negative effect it would likely have on their lives.

In addition to the Courier, other groups and institutions that decried the punitive use of the blue discharge included the American Legion, the National Association for the Advancement of Colored People, the Congress of Industrial Organizations, and the Veterans Benevolent Association. In the U.S. Senate, the chairman of the Senate Veterans Committee, Sen. Edwin C. Johnson (D-Colorado), read the Courier's editorial into the record. On October 29, 1945, noting that a blue discharge meant the veteran had not been convicted and yet had been separated from the military without being able to defend himself, he said: "There ought not to be a twilight zone between innocence and guilt. Blue discharges are certain to be a headache for Congress from now on."

== House Report on blue discharges ==
In response to reports about the disparate treatment of blue-ticket veterans, the House Committee on Military Affairs appointed a special committee to review the Veterans Administration's procedures. The committee, headed by Rep. Carl T. Durham (D-NC), issued its report officially called "Investigations of the National War Effort", commonly known as "Blue Discharges", on January 30, 1946. The committee expressed its amazement that anyone with a blue discharge would risk further stigmatization by speaking out against the discrimination:

It should be borne in mind that even a moderate amount of complaint in a matter of this sort is significant. For a person to make such a complaint in his own case implies that he feels a sense of injustice so great that he is willing to risk publicizing the stigma of having been discharged from the Army under circumstances which savor of disgrace. For each complainant there are many more who feel the same sense of injustice but prefer to bury their hurt in as much oblivion as possible.

In examining case histories of blue-discharge veterans, the committee found that "the procedure lends itself to dismissals based on prejudice and antagonism". Further, the committee found that the effects of a blue discharge "differ little from those of a dishonorable discharge...the discharged man finds it difficult to get or keep a job. The suspicion of society is aroused against him, all the worse in some ways for carrying an atmosphere of mystery." The report said that "nothing could more clearly prove the anomalous and illogical and disingenuous nature of the blue discharge than this policy of the Veterans Administration". The committee called the system for dealing with blue-ticket veterans "a squeeze play between the war department and the veterans' administration" and took the agency to task for assuming "the right to separate the sheep from the goats" and "passing moral verdicts on the history of any soldier".

To reform the discharge system the committee recommended:

- Automatic review for all blue discharges
- That the Army be required to demonstrate that it made multiple attempts to rehabilitate the service member before issuing a blue discharge
- The right to counsel for service members being given a blue discharge, either provided by the military or private counsel
- Copies of procedural regulations regarding the blue discharge process be provided upon request
- That any discharge that did not specify the quality of service state plainly that it is not dishonorable

The committee also recommended changing the discharge system to four classifications: honorable and dishonorable, with no change in their definitions; "under honorable conditions" to replace the blue discharge; and general, to cover separation for misconduct.

== Aftermath ==
Despite the Committee's report, the VA continued to discriminate against homosexual blue-tickets, renewing its 1945 directive in 1946 and again in 1949. Blue discharges were discontinued as of July 1, 1947, and two new headings, general and undesirable, took their place. A general discharge was considered to be under honorable conditions—distinct from an "honorable discharge" — and an undesirable discharge was under conditions other than honorable — distinct from a "dishonorable discharge". At the same time, the Army changed its regulations to ensure that homosexual service members would not qualify for general discharges. Those found guilty of engaging in homosexual conduct still received dishonorable discharges, while those identified as homosexuals but not to have committed any homosexual acts now received undesirable discharges. By the 1970s, a service member who had not committed any homosexual acts would tend to receive a general discharge, while those found to have engaged in homosexual sex tended to receive undesirable discharges. Homosexual service members continued to receive a disproportionate percentage of the undesirable discharges issued. This was the status quo until replaced in 1993 by the policy commonly known as "don't ask, don't tell".

It has been suggested that the large homosexual populations in port cities like San Francisco, Chicago and New York City are in part the result of the blue discharge. The theory asserts that many blue-ticket veterans from smaller urban or rural areas, feeling they were unable to return to their home communities because of the shame associated with their discharges, relocated to larger areas with established gay subcultures or simply stayed in the city through which they were returned to the United States.
