= Veterans Benevolent Association =

Early gay-interest organization founded by World War II veterans

The Veterans Benevolent Association (VBA) was an organization for LGBT veterans of the United States armed forces. The VBA was founded in New York City in 1945 by four honorably discharged gay veterans.

== History ==
Although serving primarily as a social outlet, the VBA formed in part in response to the sense of injustice that many gay veterans felt about being given blue discharges. These discharges, so-called because they were printed on blue paper, were issued to those whose military service ended under less-than-honorable, although not dishonorable, conditions. Under a Veterans Administration directive, blue discharge holders were denied the benefits of the G.I. Bill (despite explicit language in the bill forbidding such denials) and the policy of excluding LGBT former service personnel from the Bill persisted for years after the discontinuation of the discharge itself. The VBA joined in coalition with the NAACP to campaign for an end to the arbitrary issuance of blue discharges both to homosexuals and to African Americans, who also received blue discharges in disproportionate numbers.

The association incorporated in New York state in 1947, making it one of the earliest incorporated LGBT groups in the country. The VBA held meetings – monthly at first, then bi-weekly – and discussion groups. The VBA had a legal advisory panel that focused on helping members who faced discrimination in employment or housing based on their sexual orientation. Membership never exceeded 100 people, although the group's dances frequently attracted several hundred, including married members and their wives.

Despite its early success as a social organization, VBA members began to disagree over the purpose of the group, leading to the rise of factionalism. The VBA disbanded in 1954. Several VBA members went on to found the New York chapter of ONE, Inc.

== See also ==
- Servicemembers Legal Defense Network
- Servicemembers United
