= Eugenics in Oregon =

Eugenics was practiced in about 33 different states. Oregon was one of the many states that implemented eugenics programs and laws. This affected a number of different groups that were marginalized for being "unfit" and often were subject to forced sterilization.

== Background ==
Eugenics is the belief and practice of controlling the genetic quality of a population by restricting people who are deemed "unfit" to reproduce. Although eugenics was not a new idea at the time, the term was coined in 1883 by Francis Galton, the half cousin of Charles Darwin, who applied Darwin's theories of evolution and selective breeding to humans. In the United States, eugenics became popular in the 19th century, but after World War I its popularity declined.

== Oregon history ==
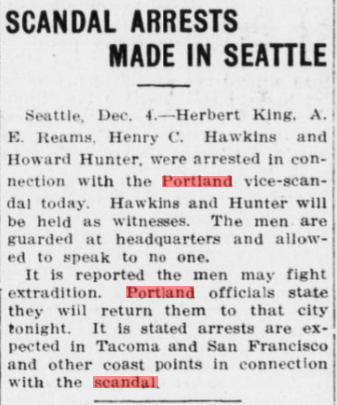
More mentions of Portland Vice Scandal

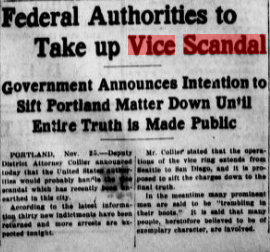
Snippet of the Portland Vice Scandal being mentioned in the newspaper

=== Portland Vice Scandal ===
On November 8, 1912, Benjamin Trout was arrested for shoplifting. During his interrogation, he told the Portland Police that homosexual activity was happening in the area. After the news broke, it became the main focus of the newspaper, not just locally but also nationally.

Federal Authorities got involved, and as many as 50 people were incriminated for crimes relating to the scandal, though many charges were later dropped due to the lack of evidence. Some of the people who were suspected of sex related crimes were people who came from reputable backgrounds who roomed at the YMCA. The YMCA was known for being supported by the "better classes", and this event caused backlash against the YMCA, similar businesses, and the wealthy, who were accused of causing the "immorality" that was happening in the city.

The newspaper covered this story for a few weeks but it impacted history for many years. Schools reinforced heterosexual teachings when it came to sex education. It affected much of the northwest to change sodomy laws so that the maximum sentence increased from five years to fifteen years and included "... other gross, bestial and perverted sexual habits". This scandal primarily influenced the states of Oregon, Washington, and Idaho to start eugenic programs, and caused the eugenic programs to focus more on sex offenders.

Acts that were considered sex offenses included:

- Contributing to the delinquency of a minor
- Crimes against nature
- Homosexuality
- Indecent and immoral acts
- Oral sex
- Sodomy

=== Sterilization bill passes ===
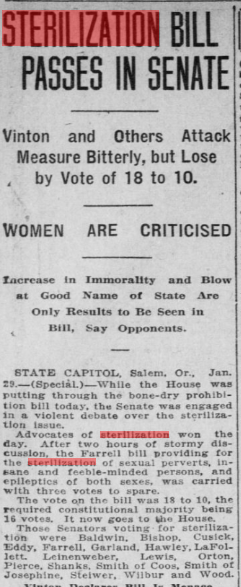
Sterilization Bill Passes

One of Oregon's first female physicians, Bethenia Angelina Owens-Adair, helped write and promote the first bill to create the Oregon Board of Eugenics in 1909. It was initially rejected by Governor George Chamberlain, but in 1913, Governor Oswald West approved the second bill that was introduced. Oswald was one of the many supporters for eugenics specifically when it pertained to sex offenders and was more driven to make the bill a reality because of the Portland Vice Scandal. Even though it did pass it did not last for very long because the Anti-Sterilization League, led by Lora Cornelia Little, was able to get a referendum which appealed the Oregon Sterilization Act of 1913 for a few years. Later, in 1917, the bill was reintroduced and signed into law. By this time, Lora Cornelia Little had moved on from the Anti-Sterilization League. The Anti-Sterilization League tried to get another referendum, but failed at this task, which lead to the establishment of the Oregon Board of Eugenics. In 1919 the law was amended to include an appeal process for patients.

=== Eugenic practices and beliefs ===
==== The affected and the effects ====
According to the Oregon Encyclopedia,

Compulsory human sterilization laws originated in America during the last half of the 19th century, driven primarily by politically active physicians interested in shaping the population to exclude undesirable demographics—such as criminals, the mentally ill, epileptics, and gays and lesbians—in a movement called eugenics.

Forced sterilization was an important part of the eugenics movement. Eugenicists generally targeted people who were poor, mentally ill, homosexual, or had been convicted of crimes. People saw wealth, good morals, good mental health, and heterosexuality as good factors that made people "fit" for marriage and reproduction. Much of this had no scientific backing. The people who were considered "unfit" were forced to undergo sterilization, which left them permanently unable to have children. According to Cera Lawrence,

During the 1970s, many male and female teenagers at homes for wayward teens, such as Fairview Hospital and Training Center in Salem, were injected with sedatives and sterilized against their will. In the court case Nancy Rae Cook v. State of Oregon (1972), 17-year-old Nancy Rae Cook appealed the Board of Social Protection's ruling that she be sterilized due to mental illness resulting from childhood physical and sexual abuse.

==== Better Babies ====
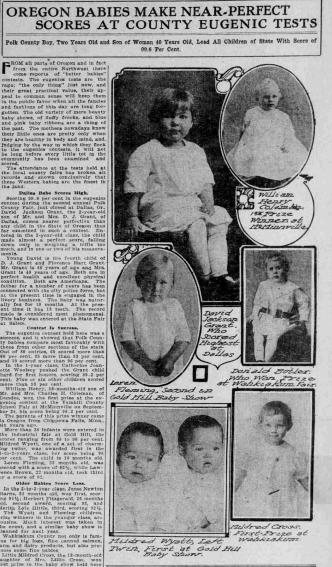
Snippet with pictures from The Sunday Oregonian over the County Eugenic Tests

In Oregon, Better Baby contests started to appear, especially at the State Fair. The goal of these contests was to determine which baby was the "better baby" from all the contestants that entered. This was done by checking their mental health, weighing them, and measuring their body proportions. Winning babies received cash prizes and were published in the newspapers. These competitions also promoted the idea that people should be careful of whom they decide to marry and procreate with. The other proponent was to decrease infant mortality rates.

=== Forced sterilization ended ===
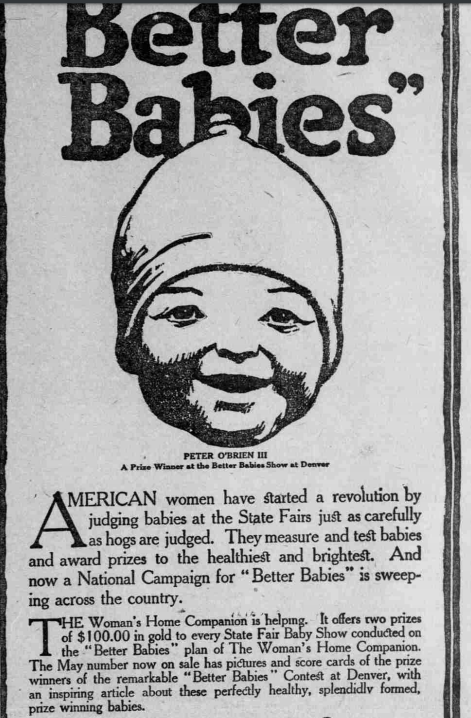
Oregon Newspaper from 1913 referring to "Better Babies"

In 1921, the 1917 statute was ruled unconstitutional by the Circuit Court of Marion County, and then in 1921 a new law was signed and passed to bring back eugenics to Oregon. The Board of Eugenics revised their practices, but even so, there was no real change. After the Civil Rights Movement and the first World War, the Board of Eugenics became the Board of Social Protection in 1967. The last recorded forced sterilization was in 1981, and in 1983 the Oregon State Senate finally abolished the statute and the board.

Oregon sterilized 2,648 people under its eugenics law.

== 21st century ==
In December 2002, Governor John Kitzhaber formally apologized for the forced sterilization that occurred in Oregon, and made December 10 Human Rights Day in Oregon.
