= Enuresis =

Involuntary urination in an older child or adult

- Other names: Uracratia
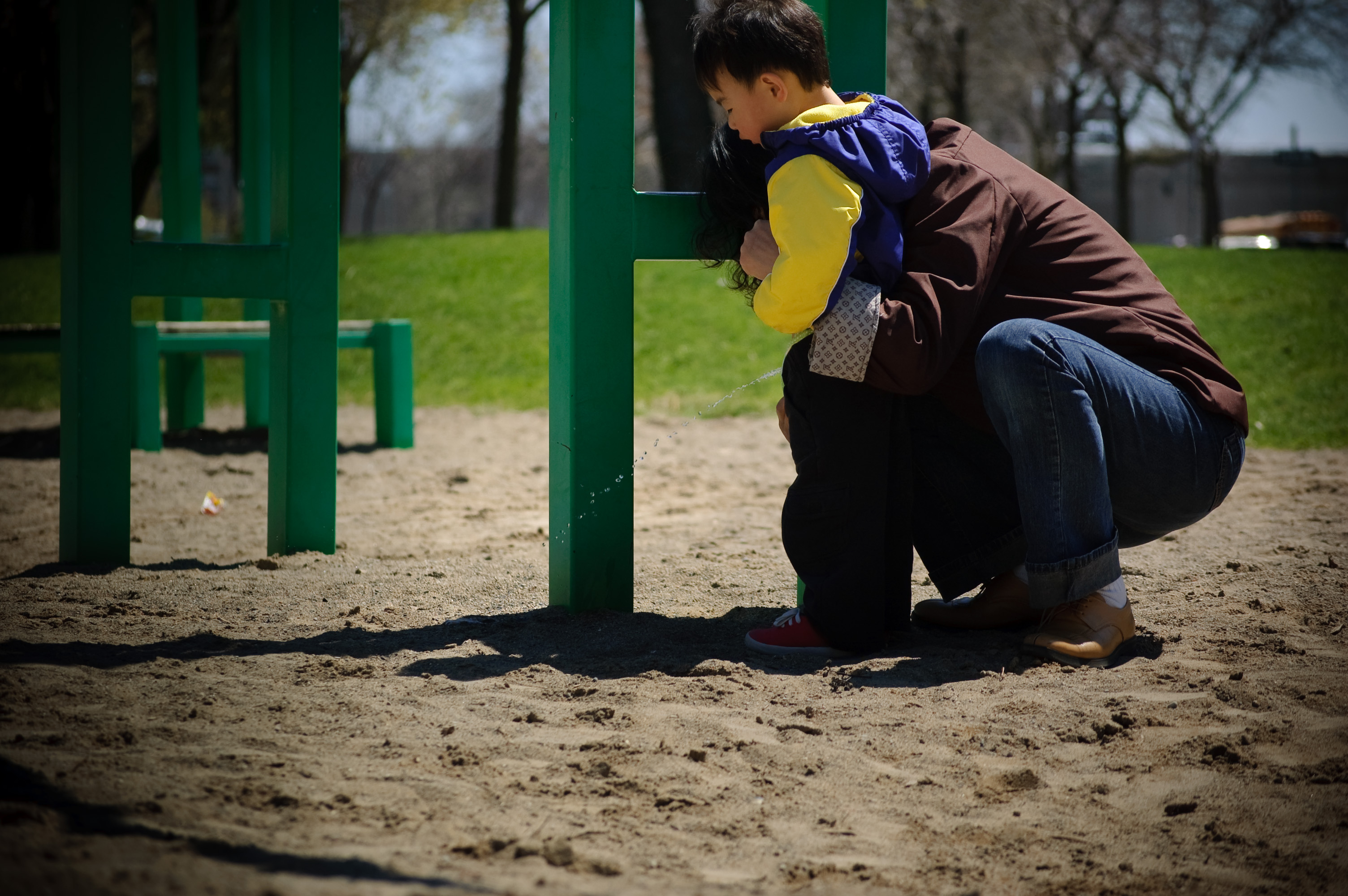
- A child may ignore the body's signal of a full bladder in order to engage in a joyous activity, such as playing on a playground.
- Specialty: Urology, Clinical Psychology, Pediatrics

Enuresis is a repeated inability to control urination. Use of the term is usually limited to describing people when it isn't age appropriate. Involuntary urination is also known as urinary incontinence. The term "enuresis" comes from the Ancient Greek: ἐνούρησις, romanized: enoúrēsis.

Enuresis has been previously viewed as a psychiatric condition, however, scientific evidence has shown this view to be unsupported through current understanding of the condition and its underlying causes.

Management of enuresis varies and includes either mitigation via specialized nightwear or bedding, or identification and correction of the underlying cause, behavioral therapy, and the use of medications.

== Signs and symptoms ==
Nocturnal enuresis usually presents with voiding of urine during sleep in a child for whom it is difficult to wake. It may be accompanied by bladder dysfunction during the day which is termed non-mono symptomatic enuresis. Day time enuresis, also known as urinary incontinence, may also be accompanied by bladder dysfunction.

The symptoms of bladder dysfunction include:

1. Urge incontinence – the presence of an overwhelming urge to urinate, frequent urination, attempts to hold the urine and urinary tract infections.
2. Voiding postponement – delaying urination in certain situations such as school.
3. Stress incontinence – incontinence that occurs in situations when increased intra-abdominal pressure occurs such as coughing.
4. Giggling incontinence – incontinence that occurs when laughing.

Secondary incontinence usually occurs in the context of a new life event that is stressful such as abuse or parental divorce.

Signs indicating a child has a daytime wetting condition may include:

- urgency to urinate with leakage of urine
- urinating 8 times a day or more
- urinating less than a regular amount of 4-7 times a day (infrequent urination)
- inability to fully empty the bladder when urinating (incomplete urination)
- avoiding urine leakage through physical compensation, like squatting, squirming, leg crossing, or heel sitting.

Signs indicating a child has a nighttime wetting condition, if they are at least 5 years old, may include:

- bedwetting that occurs at least 2 times a week over at least 3 months
- reoccurrence of bedwetting after 6 months of no bedwetting.

=== Impact ===
It is recommended that children are made aware that bedwetting is not their fault, especially due to preconceived notions of inadequate parenting or psychiatric issues leading to enuresis. Untreated enuresis may lead to a lack of self-esteem or avoidance of social activities. Children with nocturnal enuresis are found to have lower quality of life, but it is not clear which aspects are most affected. More studies are needed to understand the impact of nocturnal enuresis on parents.

== Causes ==
Bedwetting children are often normal emotionally and physically, although enuresis can be caused by other health conditions. Primary nocturnal enuresis can have multiple causes, which can make approaching a course of treatment more difficult.Enuresis can be caused by one or more of the following:

=== Caffeine consumption ===
Caffeine is a diuretic, which means that it increases urine production. Reports from those who have failed enuresis treatment say that they were not recommended to limit caffeine and that they mostly consume 2 to 4 mg/kg/day.

=== Pattern and volume of fluid intake ===
A pediatric day can be categorized into 3 periods: 7 AM to 12 PM, 12 PM to 5 PM, and after 5 PM. Children with enuresis are usually dehydrated and drink the most after 5 PM. This can be remedied by having the child drink 40% of daily fluid requirement before noon, 40% from noon to 4:30 PM, and 20% in the evening.

=== Lower functional bladder capacity ===
Children with enuresis have lower functional bladder capacity than healthy children. This means that their bladders hold less urine, often over 50% less.

=== Dysfunctional voiding ===
Both bladder voiding and storage problems may be present with dysfunctional voiding and may be present at any age. It is characterized by an obstruction of the bladder as a result of a non-neurogenic cause, which is due to the muscles controlling urine flow that do not completely relax. Symptoms may include daytime wetting, night wetting, urgency, a feeling that the bladder is always full, and straining to urinate.

=== Urinary tract infection ===
It is uncommon for nocturnal enuresis, in the absence of other symptoms, to be caused by an infection. Pinworms have been linked with sudden onset enuresis in young girls.

=== Delay in maturation and development ===
Mastering urinary control during sleep time is a normal part of childhood development and may be delayed by stress and social pressures. The risk for enuresis increases threefold for children who experience stress, demonstrated by the higher prevalence of enuresis in lower socioeconomic groups.Anxiety experienced by a child between ages 2 to 4 also increases the risk for enuresis because this particular time period is sensitive for the development of nighttime bladder control.Nocturnal enuresis has been found to be more common in those with developmental delay, physical or intellectual disabilities, and psychological or behavioral disorders.

=== Bladder instability ===
Urodynamic sleep studies show that enuretic children have high pressure bladder contractions more frequently while they are asleep when compared to healthy children.

=== Nocturnal polyuria and antidiuretic hormone secretion ===
Nocturnal polyuria is defined as having more than 130% of the expected bladder capacity, which is specific for each age. Many children with nocturnal enuresis have altered nighttime secretion levels of antidiuretic hormone, which controls water retention in the body. This results in low antidiuretic hormone levels and excessive amounts of urine produced during sleep time.

=== Sleep disorders ===
The inability to wake from sleep has been understood as one cause of nocturnal enuresis, however studies focused on the importance of the time of night in which enuresis episodes occur have shown inconsistent results. Parents often report that their bedwetting children are very difficult to awaken from sleep, therefore research regarding enuresis has also aimed to elucidate why children with enuresis do not awaken from the sensation of a full bladder. Some studies have led to hypotheses that children with enuresis have altered hemodynamics during sleep (in terms of measurements of blood pressure and heart rate), sleep-disordered breathing, and altered hypothalamus function leading to a lack of bladder control during sleep.

=== Genetics ===
Enuresis is also theorized to be a hereditary condition based on epidemiological and genetic studies. Although several genes are considered of interest in relation to enuresis, lack of a single gene that may cause enuresis means that individuals of a family may have differing genetic mechanisms resulting in the condition.

== Pathophysiology ==
Currently, nocturnal enuresis is understood to be caused by three main underlying factors: excess urine production at night, lack of capacity for bladder storage, and inability to wake from sleep, with pathogenesis possibly varying based on presence of daytime symptoms. The inability to control the detrusor muscle has been theorized as a possible pathophysiological cause of enuresis, which may explain why anticholinergic drugs are effective as medication therapy, since they act on the detrusor muscles.

== Diagnosis ==
Clinical definition of enuresis is urinary incontinence beyond age of 4 years for daytime and beyond 6 years for nighttime, or loss of continence after three months of dryness.All these criteria must be met in order to diagnose an individual. Generally, healthcare providers may further investigate for bladder control issues if a child is still enuretic in the daytime by age 4, or if they are still enuretic at nighttime by age 5 or 6.

=== Classification ===
The International Children's Continence Society (ICCS) has developed the following standard terminology:

- Primary enuresis refers to children who have never been successfully trained to control urination.
- Secondary enuresis refers to children who have been successfully trained and are continent for at least 6 months but revert to wetting in a response to some sort of stressful situation.

There are 2 categories of enuresis:

- Monosymptomatic enuresis (MNE) – Does not include bladder dysfunction during daytime.
- Nonmonosymptomatic enuresis (NMNE) – Includes bladder dysfunction causing daytime incontinence that is frequent and urgent. Wetting that occurs in the daytime is sometimes referred to as diurnal enuresis. Other conditions, or comorbidities, that commonly accompany enuresis may be expected to be more common with NMNE.

== Management ==
There are a number of management options for enuresis. Management of enuresis, both nocturnal and daytime, can include behavioral therapy, drug therapy, traditional Chinese medicine (TCM), and other alternative medicine therapies. Treatment of enuresis for children under 5 years old is not recommended. In adults with nocturnal enuresis, use of a bedwetting diary, which keeps track of when enuresis occurs, may be helpful for healthcare providers to figure out the causes of a person's enuresis and their best route for treatment.

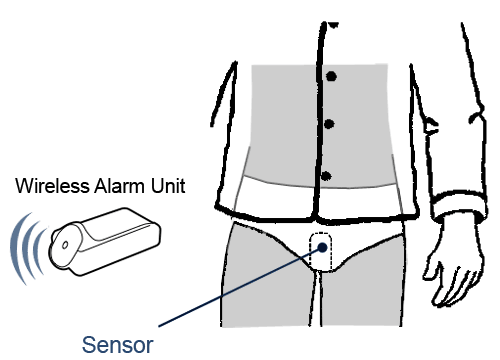
Enuresis Alarm

=== Behavioral therapy ===
Simple behavioral interventions may prove to be superior in comparison to no ongoing form of treatment and are recommended as initial treatment.

- Nighttime fluid limitation
- Enuresis alarm – includes sleeping mats with electrical circuits; alarms with sensors placed in child's underwear; alarms that are wired or wireless and produce noise, vibration, or light; and alarm clocks or mobile phones for older individuals
- Motivational therapy
- Bladder training – training the bladder to hold more urine
- Reward systems – give star charts for dry nights
- Lifting – carrying the child, who is still asleep, away from the bed to an appropriate place to urinate

Waking a child up at night is not a medically supported long-term cure or solution for nocturnal enuresis, and may just be a one-time solution even if it appears to resolve enuresis.

=== Urotherapy ===
Urotherapy is a non pharmacological and non surgical approach for managing enuresis, particularly in children. It includes structured interventions aimed at improving bladder and bowel function, such as scheduled voiding, guidance on fluid intake, toilet posture, and monitoring urinary and bowel habits. Evidence indicates that urotherapy, as a first line intervention, can reduce symptoms of urinary incontinence and improve bladder function in pediatric populations.

==== Neurostimulation ====
Evidence suggests that neurostimulation therapy may be an efficacious and safe form of treatment of pediatric primary enuresis, also known as bedwetting. Neurostimulation of the sacral nerve is an option for children in which all other therapies have failed. Neurostimulation treatment of adult enuresis may be considered prior to pursuing surgical methods. For adult enuresis, sacral nerve stimulation can be administered to decrease bladder muscle activity so that the bladder muscles are not constantly in a contracted state to help improve enuresis symptoms.

==== Hypnotherapy ====
Hypnotherapy is often performed under the guidance of a licensed clinician or hypnotherapist. It is a guided state of relaxation, concentration and focused attention, and is often where the individual is in a guided trance-like state to treat conditions such as pediatric enuresis. However, some studies have shown that the utilization of enuresis alarm may be more effective than hypnotherapy. On the other hand, certain types of hypnotherapy may be more effective compared to no treatment of enuresis, but evidence is insufficient.

=== Medications ===
Nighttime incontinence may be treated by increasing antidiuretic hormone levels. The hormone can be boosted by a synthetic version known as desmopressin, or DDAVP. Desmopressin is approved by the United States Food & Drug Administration (FDA) for use in children 6 years and older with primary nocturnal enuresis and is available in both spray and tablet formulations. There is good short-term success rate; however, there is difficulty in keeping the bed dry after medication is stopped.In children whose enuresis symptoms do not resolve with desmopressin, anticholinergic drugs may be effective as a second-line therapy or as an add-on drug with desmopressin. However currently only oxybutynin has an FDA-approved labeled indication in children aged 6 and older. An additional third-line alternative shown to be effective is the tricyclic antidepressant imipramine, however the use of tricyclic antidepressants carries the risk of cardiotoxicity and is not recommended to be given without evaluating a person's risk factors for certain heart diseases.

=== Acupuncture ===
There are multiple studies examining the efficacy of acupuncture in treating nocturnal enuresis in children, but the evidence is generally of low quality and has multiple limitations. Therefore, there is not strong evidence to suggest that acupuncture is useful for treating enuresis.

== Epidemiology ==
Approximately 10% of six- to seven-year-olds around the world experience enuresis. While 15% to 20% of five‐year‐old children experience nocturnal enuresis which usually goes away as they grow older, approximately 2% to 5% of young adults experience nocturnal enuresis. About 3% of teenagers and 0.5% to 1% of adults experience enuresis or bedwetting, with the chance of it resolving being lower if it is considered frequent.

== History ==
Enuresis was first documented in the Ebers Papyrus in 1550 BC. Roman author Gaius Plinius Secundus (AD 23/24–79) (Pliny the Elder) documents nocturnal enuresis in his work, "Natural History" (AD 77), stating that "the incontinence of urine in infants is checked by giving boiled mice in their food." Furthermore, in the eighteenth century, children with enuresis were subjected to a variety of chemical and mechanical treatments including fluid restriction, enemata, the use of an alarm clock, cold baths, warm baths, cold dashes to the perineum and douches to the lower spine.Enuresis has previously been documented as an occurrence in members of the military. During World War II, bedwetting was considered as part of neuropsychiatric evaluation of a soldier for discharge.

== See also ==
- Nocturnal enuresis
- Urinary incontinence
