= Clara Ward, Princesse de Caraman-Chimay =

American socialite

Clara Ward
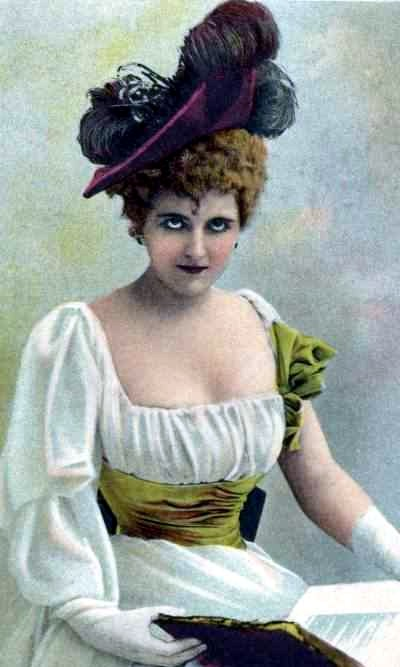
- An English postcard from c. 1905, featuring a German chromolithograph of Clara Ward
- Born: Clara Ward; June 17, 1873; Detroit, Michigan, US
- Died: December 9, 1916 (aged 43); Padua, Italy
- Spouse(s): Joseph, Prince de Caraman-Chimay (m. 1890; div. 1897) Rigó Jancsi; Peppino Ricciardo; Signor Cassalota

Clara Ward (17 June 1873 – 9 December 1916) was a wealthy American socialite who married Joseph, Prince de Caraman-Chimay of Belgium.

== Early life ==
Clara Ward was born in Detroit, Michigan, the daughter of Captain Eber Brock Ward (1811–1875) and his second wife, Catherine Lyon, a niece of Senator Benjamin Wade. A wealthy man, often stated to be Michigan's first millionaire, E.B. Ward had holdings in Great Lakes steamships; lumbering at Ludington, Michigan; iron and steel manufacturing at Wyandotte, Michigan, Leland, Michigan, Milwaukee, Wisconsin, and Chicago, Illinois; and silver mining in Colorado. He manufactured the first Bessemer steel to be made in the United States at his plant in Wyandotte. Ward was president of the Flint and Pere Marquette Railroad from 1860 until his death on 2 January 1875 in Detroit.

Captain Ward died when Clara was less than two years old. The mill and timber holdings at Ludington passed into the hands of Clara's mother and were managed by her brother, Thomas R. Lyon, as the firm of Thomas R. Lyon, Agent. As a child, Clara and her mother periodically visited Ludington to see their kin and inspect the mills.

== First marriage ==
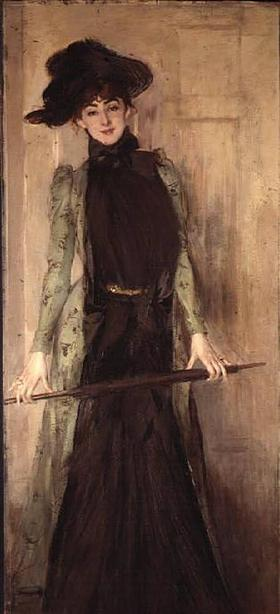
Paris-based artist Boldini pictured Ward in 1889

She came to the public's attention in 1889 or early 1890 when it was announced that Prince of Caraman-Chimay, a member of the Belgian Chamber of Deputies, had proposed marriage to her.

The title "Prince of Caraman-Chimay" was of the foreign prince type of the Ancien Régime in which "prince" is a noble rank rather than a close male relative of the monarch. The wife of a foreign prince receives the title "princess". That her husband-to-be was nearly twice her age and relatively poor seems to have been of minor consequence. They were married on 20 May 1890 in Paris. Clara was married at age 16, and her husband was 31.

Ward became "Princesse de Caraman-Chimay", though she was usually called "Clara, Princess of Chimay".

Two children shortly followed the marriage:

- Marie Elisabeth Catharine Anatole de Riquet, Comtesse de Caraman-Chimay (1891–1939)
- Marie Joseph Anatole Pierre Alphonse de Riquet, Prince de Caraman-Chimay (1894–1920)

There is evidence that she and the Prince favored the more prestigious Parisian restaurants with their patronage. Specifically, the great chef Escoffier named both Oeufs à la Chimay and Poularde Chimay after Princess Clara.

== Second marriage ==
Famed French artist Henri de Toulouse-Lautrec pictured Ward watching a stage show in 1897

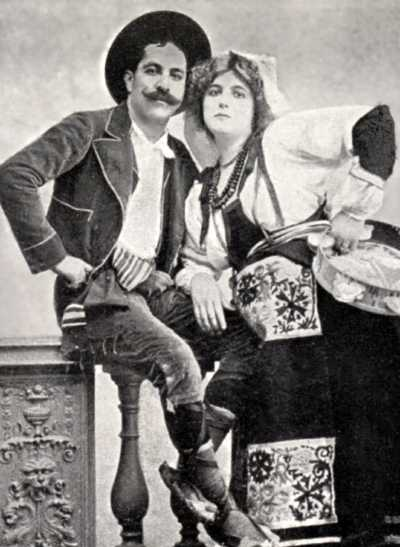
Clara Ward and her second husband, Rigó Jancsi, from a photograph on a German postcard from about 1905

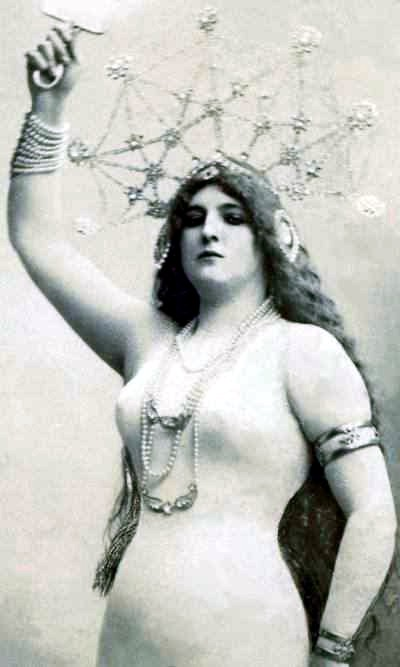
A French albumen print of Ward, wearing a flesh-colored bodystocking and holding a mirror aloft, from about 1905

In early November 1896, the Prince and Princess Chimay were dining in Paris. Present at the same restaurant was a Hungarian, Rigó Jancsi ("Blackbird Johnny"), a Gypsy violinist.

After a series of secret meetings, Ward and Rigó eloped in December 1896. To her family's consternation, the Ludington Record of 24 December 1896 carried news of the elopement with a woodcut illustration of Ward and the headline "Gone With a Gypsy". It was stated that Prince Joseph would institute divorce proceedings against his wife. Subsequent editions of the newspaper carried brief notices as to where Ward and Rigó had been reported seen during their trek across Europe to Hungary. A well-known cube-shaped chocolate sponge cake and chocolate cream pastry in Budapest was named Rigó Jancsi after the scandalous affair. The Prince and Princesse de Caraman-Chimay were divorced on 19 January 1897. The new couple married, likely in Hungary. Some accounts indicate that they soon moved to Egypt, where Clara taught her husband the intricacies of reading and writing.

Still called the Princess Chimay, Clara Ward soon found her resources dwindling. She was cut off from her first husband's finances. Although Ward was resourceful, her American family occasionally provided financial assistance.

She employed her beauty and celebrity to pose on various stages, including the Folies Bergère and likely the Moulin Rouge, while wearing form-fitting costumes. She called her art form poses plastiques. Henri de Toulouse-Lautrec made a scarce lithograph of her and Rigó in 1897 titled Idylle Princière. She was often photographed, and featured on many postcards during the Edwardian period, sometimes in a pose plastique and sometimes in a more or less conventional dress. Kaiser Wilhelm II is said to have forbidden the publication or display of her photograph in the German Empire because he thought her beauty "disturbing".

== Later life ==
The couple may have earned enough income from their occupation to lead a comfortable life. However, Rigó's infidelity led to their divorce shortly after their marriage. Following the divorce, Ward entered a new romantic relationship with Peppino Ricciardo, who was likely Italian despite occasional references to him being Spanish. It is believed that they met on a train, possibly when Peppino was working as a waiter.

Ward and Peppino Ricciardo got married in 1904, but their marriage was likely short-lived. The exact timeline is unclear, but Ward's next love interest and final husband is believed to have been Signor Cassalota, a station manager of a small Italian railroad that facilitated tours of Mount Vesuvius. When Ward passed away in Padua, Italy, on December 9, 1916, at the age of 43, she was likely still married to her fourth husband.

It wasn't until approximately three years after Ward's death that her first husband, Joseph, Prince de Caraman-Chimay, remarried Anne Marie Charlotte Amélie Gilone Le Veneur de Tillières (1889–1962) on June 24, 1920.

== Legacy ==
Marcel Proust was fond of Clara. Marthe Bibesco wrote in her memoir, Au Bal avec Marcel Proust, that her cousin, Antoine, who exchanged letters with Proust, received one in which he mentioned that he still felt fondly for Ward and continued to write to her. In fact, Proust based a character in À la recherche du temps perdu (English: "In Search of Lost Time") on Clara Ward: that of a cousin of the Baron Charlus. The major character of the Duchesse de Guermantes was chiefly based on Clara Ward's first sister-in-law, Elisabeth, who became the Comtesse de Greffulhe after her marriage. The character of Simone Pistache in the film version of Cole Porter's musical Can-Can was based in part on Clara Ward. In the film, set in Paris in 1896, Shirley MacLaine as Pistache dances in a skin-tight, flesh-colored costume like that favored by Ward.

== See also ==
- Rigo Jancsi Celebration Cake

== General references ==
- Cleveland Amory, Who Killed Society?, p. 234. New York: Harper & Brothers, 1960.
- "Gone With a Gypsy", news dispatch in the Ludington Record, December 24, 1896.
- Luman W. Goodenough, Lumber, Lath and Shingles, pp. 54–55. Detroit: Privately printed, 1954. Written by a childhood acquaintance of Ward's who died in 1947.
- George W. Hotchkiss, History of the Lumber and Forest Industry of the Northwest, pp. 715–716. Chicago: George W. Hotchkiss & Company, 1898.
- History of Manistee, Mason and Oceana Counties, Michigan, pp. 50–51. Chicago: H.R. Page & Co., 1882.
- The National Cyclopedia of American Biography, Vol. XIII, p. 125. New York: James T. White & Company, 1906.
- Cornelia Otis Skinner, Elegant Wits and Grand Horizontals, p. 220. Boston: Houghton Mifflin Company, 1962.
- Charles Richard Tuttle, General History of the State of Michigan, pp. 157–159. Detroit: R.D.S. Tyler & Co., 1873.
