= Caraman =

Caraman may refer to:

== Places ==
- Caraman, Haute-Garonne, a commune in the Haute-Garonne department, France
- Saint-Félix-de-Caraman, the old name of Saint-Félix-Lauragais, a commune in the Haute-Garonne department, France

== People ==
- Alexandru Caraman (fl. 1990–2016), former Transnistrian politician
- Ludmila Caraman (born 1985), Moldovan footballer

=== Caraman-Chimay family of Belgium ===
- François-Joseph-Philippe de Riquet (1771–1843), Count of Charaman
- Joseph de Riquet de Caraman (1808–1886), Belgian diplomat and industrialist
- Joseph de Riquet de Caraman-Chimay (1836–1892), Belgian diplomat and politician
- Joseph, Prince de Caraman-Chimay (1858–1937), Belgian aristocrat and Olympic fencer
- Élisabeth, Countess Greffulhe (1860–1952), born Riquet de Caraman-Chimay
- Clara Ward, Princesse de Caraman-Chimay (1873–1916), wealthy American socialite and wife of Joseph (1858–1937)

== See also ==
- Karaman, a city in south central Turkey
- Karamanids, an Anatolian beylik of the 14th and 15th centuries
- Qaraman, a village in Azerbaijan
