= Victor de Riquet, 1st Duke of Caraman =

Victor de Riquet de Caraman
- Duke of Caraman; Marquis of Caraman; Count of Caraman
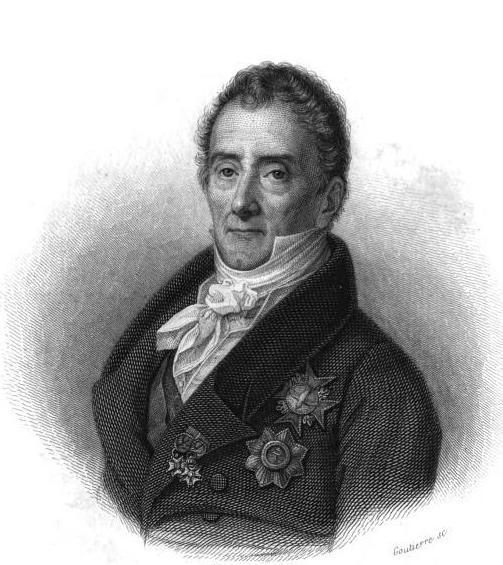
- Born: 24 December 1762; Paris, France
- Died: 25 December 1839 (aged 77); Montpellier, France
- Spouse: Joséphine Léopoldine Ghislaine de Merode (m. 1785; died 1824)
- Issue: Victor Marie Joseph Louis de Riquet de Caraman; Georges de Riquet de Caraman; Louise de Riquet de Caraman; Adolphe de Riquet de Caraman
Names
- Louis Charles Victor de Riquet de Caraman
- House: Riquet de Caraman

Louis Charles Victor de Riquet, 1st Duke of Caraman (24 December 1762 – 25 December 1839), known as the 4th Count of Caraman from 1807 to 1817, then 1st Marquis of Caraman from 1817 to 1830; was a French diplomat and soldier who became Lieutenant General of the King's Armies. He was a Peer of France from 1815 until his death.

== Early life ==
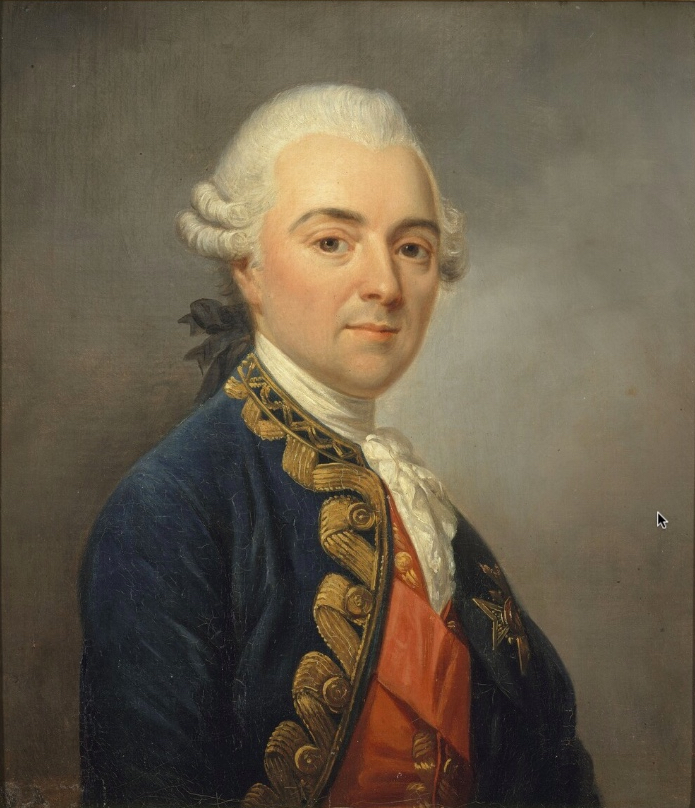
Portrait of his father, Victor Maurice de Riquet, by Charles-Alexandre Debacq, 1841

Caraman was born on 24 December 1762 in Paris. He was the eldest son of Victor Maurice de Riquet, 4th Count of Caraman (1727–1807), and Marie Anne Gabrielle Josephe Francoise Xaviere de Henin-Liétard, Princess of Chimay (1728–1800). Among his siblings was younger brothers Maurice Gabriel de Riquet de Caraman and François-Joseph-Philippe de Riquet, who succeeded their childless maternal uncle as Prince of Chimay in 1804 and inherited the Chimay estates. (Note: After the Battle of Waterloo in 1815, the Chimay estates became part of the United Kingdom of the Netherlands and, after 1830, of the current Kingdom of Belgium.)

His paternal grandparents were Colonel of the Régiment de Berry, François de Riquet de Caraman, 3rd Count of Caraman, and Louise Madeleine Antoinette Portail (a daughter of politician Antoine Portail). His maternal grandparents were Alexandre Gabriel Joseph de Hénin-Liétard, Marquess of La Verre, 12th Prince of Chimay, and Gabrielle Françoise de Beauvau-Craon. His maternal uncle, Philippe Gabriel Maurice Joseph de Hénin-Liétard, 15th Prince of Chimay, was married to Laure Auguste de Fitz-James (a daughter of Charles de Fitz-James, 4th Duke of Fitz-James). Another uncle, Charles-Alexandre de Hénin-Liétard d'Alsace, who was guillotined on charges of counter-revolutionary conspiracy during the French Revolution. Through his brother François, he was uncle to Joseph de Riquet de Caraman, 17th Prince of Chimay.

== Career ==
Caraman distinguished himself early in his diplomatic career, traveling to the principal parts of Europe over the course of five to six years. The Count of Vergennes, Minister of Foreign Affairs, had recommended him to his diplomatic agents: he was thus well received by King Frederick the Great, Emperor Joseph II, and Empress Catherine the Great. He became friends with the Prince of Kaunitz, Prince Grigory Potemkin, Prince Józef Poniatowski, Prime Minister William Pitt the Younger, and Foreign Secretary Charles James Fox. He met the Count of Saint-Priest in Constantinople.

After the campaign of 1792 and the death of the King, he was placed on the list of émigrés and all his family's property was confiscated. From then on he was forced to live abroad and seek a means of existence there.

He served as a Major and as a Cavalry Colonel in the Prussian Army. He was called back to France by his father in 1801, returning as a Prussian officer; at the moment when he wanted to return to Prussia, he was arrested and put in the Tour du Temple (where the French royal family had been held) without explanation. He was then sent to Ivrea in Piedmont. Detained for five years, he was given his freedom on condition that he would leave the Prussian service, but was kept on the list of émigrés.

Upon the death of his father in 1807, he became the 4th Count of Caraman. The title had been created in 1670 for his ancestor, Pierre-Paul Riquet, the engineer responsible for the construction of the Canal du Midi.

=== Bourbon Restoration ===
Following the Bourbon Restoration, King Louis XVIII gave him back his rights in 1814, but not all his fortune. He was sent as an Envoy Extraordinary and Minister Plenipotentiary of France to the Brandenburg-Prussian Court in Berlin, charged with the mission of receiving the numerous columns of prisoners that Russia, Poland and Prussia were returning to France. On 17 August 1815, he was named a Peer of France.

In 1816, he was named Ambassador to Vienna and was succeeded in Berlin by Charles François, Marquis de Bonnay. On 31 August 1817, he was created Marquis of Caraman. In 1818, he attended the Congress of Aix-la-Chapelle with his friend, the Duke of Richelieu (the former and future prime minister), his friend, and was later named Minister Plenipotentiary at the Congress of Troppau in 1820, the Congress of Laibach in 1821 and Congress of Verona in 1822.

Returning to France in 1828, he received the title of hereditary Duke of Caraman on 10 May 1830 by King Charles X. After the July Revolution in 1830, he refused to take any active position; but he continued to sit in the Chamber of Peers.

== Personal life ==
On 10 July 1785 at Everberghe, Belgium, he was married to Baroness Joséphine Léopoldine Ghislaine de Merode-Westerloo (1765–1824), a daughter of Philippe Maximilien de Merode, Count of Mérode, and Marie Catherine de Merode, Princess of Rubempré. Before her death in 1824, they were the parents of:

- Victor Marie Joseph Louis de Riquet de Caraman (1786–1837), styled Marquis of Caraman who married his cousin, Marie-Anne Gabrielle Joséphine Françoise de Riquet de Caraman, a daughter of Maurice Gabriel de Riquet de Caraman, in 1810. After her death in 1823, he married Antoinette Césarine de Galard de Béarn in 1827.
- Georges Joseph Victor de Riquet de Caraman (1790–1860), styled Count of Caraman who became a diplomat serving as Minister to the Kingdom of Württemberg in Stuttgart and Envoy to the Kingdom of Saxony in Dresden; he married Marie Claire Duval de Grenonville.
- Auguste Charlotte Louise de Riquet de Caraman (1798–1849), who married Emmanuel Louis Marie Guignard de Saint-Priest, 1st Duke of Almazán, in 1817.
- Adolphe Frédéric Joseph Marie Victor de Riquet de Caraman (1800–1876), an explorer who restored the Château d'Anet from 1840 to 1860.

The Duke died on 25 December 1839 in Montpellier, Hérault, France. As his eldest son predeceased him in 1837 (while commanding the artillery during the French conquest of Algeria), he was succeeded in his titles by his grandson, Victor Antoine Charles de Riquet de Caraman. His second son, Georges, took his place at the head of the Canal du Midi company.

== Notes ==
French nobility
Preceded by Victor Maurice de Riquet	Count of Caraman; 1807–1839	Succeeded by Victor Antoine Charles de Riquet
New creation	Marquis of Caraman; 1817–1839	Succeeded by Victor Antoine Charles de Riquet
New creation	Duke of Caraman; 1830–1839	Succeeded by Victor Antoine Charles de Riquet
