= Duke of Caraman =

- Creation date: 10 May 1830
- Created by: Charles X
- Peerage: France
- First holder: Louis Charles Victor de Riquet, 1st Marquis of Caraman
- Present holder: Philippe de Riquet, 7th Duke of Caraman
- Subsidiary titles: Marquis of Caraman; Count of Caraman; Baron of Bonrepos
- Former seats: Château de Bonrepos; Château d'Anet; Château des Caramans; Château de Boussu

Duke of Caraman is a title that was created in the Peerage of France on 10 May 1830 for the French diplomat Louis Charles Victor de Riquet, 1st Marquis of Caraman.

== History ==
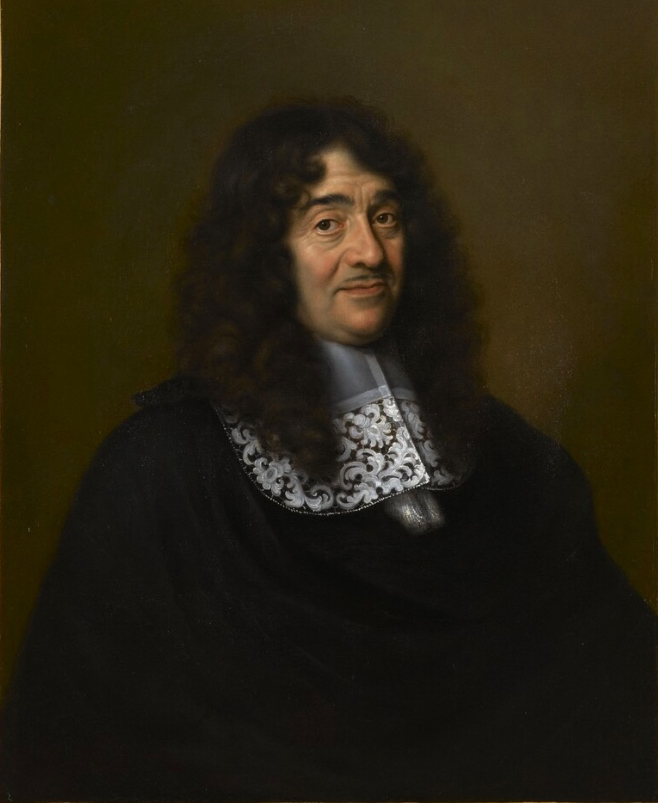
Portrait of Pierre-Paul Riquet, 1st Baron of Bonrepos

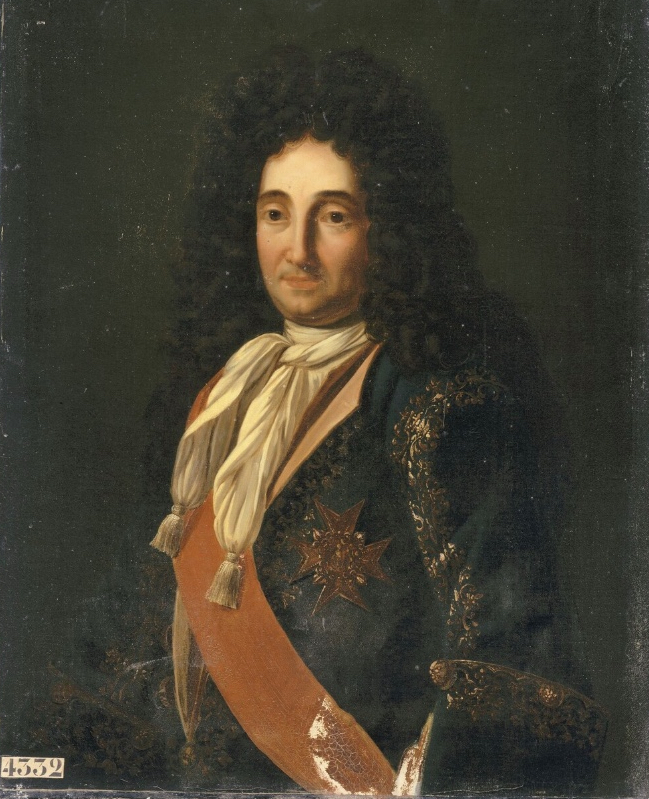
Portrait of Pierre-Paul II Riquet, 1st Count of Caraman

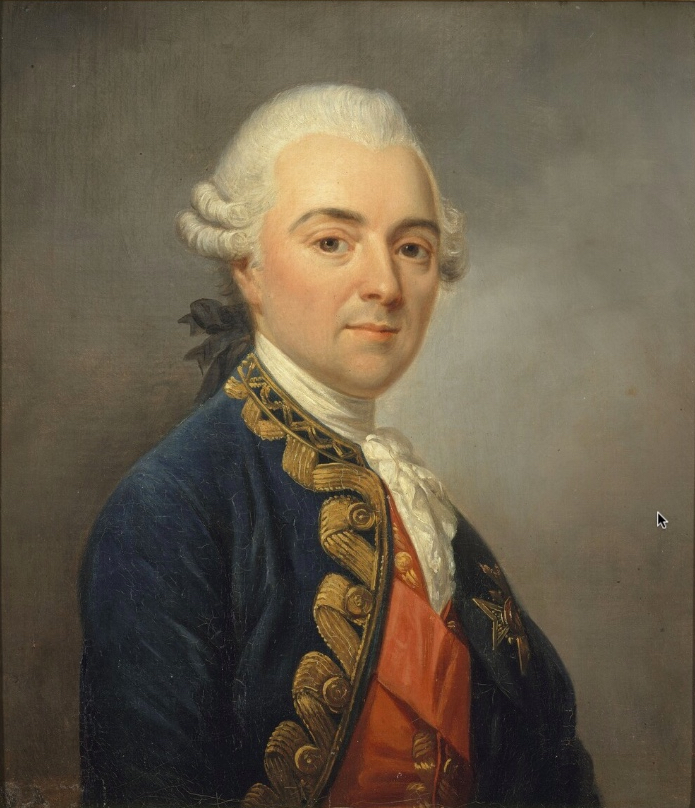
Portrait of Victor Maurice de Riquet, 3rd Count of Caraman, by Charles-Alexandre Debacq, 1841

The Riquet family is originally from Languedoc (Béziers). They were ennobled by King Louis XIV on 20 November 1666 when Pierre-Paul Riquet, the engineer responsible for the construction of the Canal du Midi, was created Baron of Bonrepos (French: Baron de Bonrepos) in the Haute-Garonne department in southwestern France. On 5 August 1670, Baron Riquet acquired the County of Caraman, also in Haute-Garonne, from Paul d'Escoubleau, Marquis of Sourdis, for his second son, Pierre-Paul II Riquet, who became the Count of Caraman (French: Comte de Caraman). As Pierre-Paul II died unmarried without issue, he transferred, by deed of cession, the County of Caraman to his nephew, Victor François de Riquet de Caraman (the eldest son of his late brother), in 1722.

The 2nd Count, Victor-François de Riquet de Caraman, married Louise Portail (a daughter of Antoine Portail, president of the Parlement of Paris), and was gifted the Château de Roissy in Roissy-en-France, Val-d'Oise by his father-in-law, which was renamed the Château des Caramans. Pélagie de Riquet de Caraman, a granddaughter of the 2nd Count (through Louis de Riquet de Caraman), married Baron Maurice-François de Mac Mahon, parents of Patrice de MacMahon, 1st Duke of Magenta, the 3rd President of France.

During the French Revolution, the property of the Counts of Caraman was confiscated and the Château de Roissy was pillaged and destroyed in 1793. They later regained their Hôtel particulier on the Rue Saint-Dominique in the 7th arrondissement of Paris. In 1817, the 4th Count, Louis Charles Victor de Riquet de Caraman, was created Marquess of Caraman (French: Marquis de Caraman) by King Louis XVIII. He was further ennobled on 10 May 1830 by King Charles X, shortly before the July Revolution (during which Charles was forced to abdicate in favor of his cousin, Louis Philippe I, as hereditary Duke-Peer of Caraman (French: Duc de Caraman). The title, however, was not followed by letters patent, making it an incomplete irregular title. The ducal title was, however, confirmed by Imperial Decree on 19 June 1869 and letters 4 May 1870, in favor of the 1st Duke's grandson, Victor Charles Emmanuel de Riquet de Caraman. When he died unmarried in 1919, the ducal title died with him, however, the title of "Duke of Caraman" was taken up proprio motu by the descendants of his brother.

=== Barons of Bonrepos (1666) ===
- 1666–1680: Pierre-Paul Riquet (c. 1609–1680)
- 1680–1714: Jean Mathias de Riquet de Caraman (1638–1714)
- 1714–1722: Victor Pierre François de Riquet de Caraman (1698–1760) (succeeded his uncle as Count of Caraman in 1722)

=== Counts of Caraman (1670) ===
- 1670–1722: Pierre-Paul II Riquet (1646–1730)
- 1722–1760: Victor Pierre François de Riquet de Caraman (1698–1760)
- 1760–1807: Victor Maurice de Riquet de Caraman (1727–1807)
- 1807–1817: Louis Charles Victor de Riquet de Caraman (1762–1839) (created Marquis of Caraman in 1817)

=== Marquesses of Caraman (1817) ===
- 1817–1830: Louis Charles Victor de Riquet de Caraman (1762–1839) (created Duke of Caraman in 1830)

=== Dukes of Caraman (1830) ===
- 1830–1839: Louis Charles Victor de Riquet de Caraman (1762–1839)
- 1839–1868: Victor Charles Antoine de Riquet de Caraman (1811–1868)
- 1868–1919: Victor Charles Emmanuel de Riquet de Caraman (1839–1919)
- 1919–1931: Georges Ernest Maurice de Riquet de Caraman (1845–1931)
- 1931–1960: Charles Paul Ernest Joseph de Riquet de Caraman (1873–1960)
- 1960–2010: Jean Victor de Riquet de Caraman (1916–2010)
- 2010–Present: Philippe Jean Maurice Gerhard de Riquet de Caraman (b. 1971)

== Other branches ==
Another son of the 3rd Count (and younger brother to the 1st Duke of Caraman), Maurice Gabriel Joseph de Riquet de Caraman (1765–1835), a French general and politician, was created Baron of the Empire by Emperor Napoleon I in 1813. The title was confirmed, and elevated to Hereditary Count by King Louis XVIII by letters patent on 3 July 1818. He lived at Château de Boussu (in the Hainaut Province, Belgium). Upon his death without male issue in 1835, the titles became extinct.

The youngest son of the 3rd Count (and younger brother to the 1st Duke of Caraman), François-Joseph-Philippe de Riquet (1771–1843), became the 16th Prince of Chimay on 24 July 1804 following the death of his childless maternal uncle, Philippe Gabriel Maurice Joseph de Hénin-Liétard, 15th Prince of Chimay. His son, Joseph de Riquet de Caraman, was created Prince of Caraman in the Dutch nobility in 1824 (he succeeded his father as the 17th Prince of Chimay in 1843).

== See also ==
- Prince of Chimay
- Prince of Caraman
