= Joseph, Prince de Caraman-Chimay =

Belgian aristocrat and fencer

Joseph de Caraman 19th Prince of Chimay
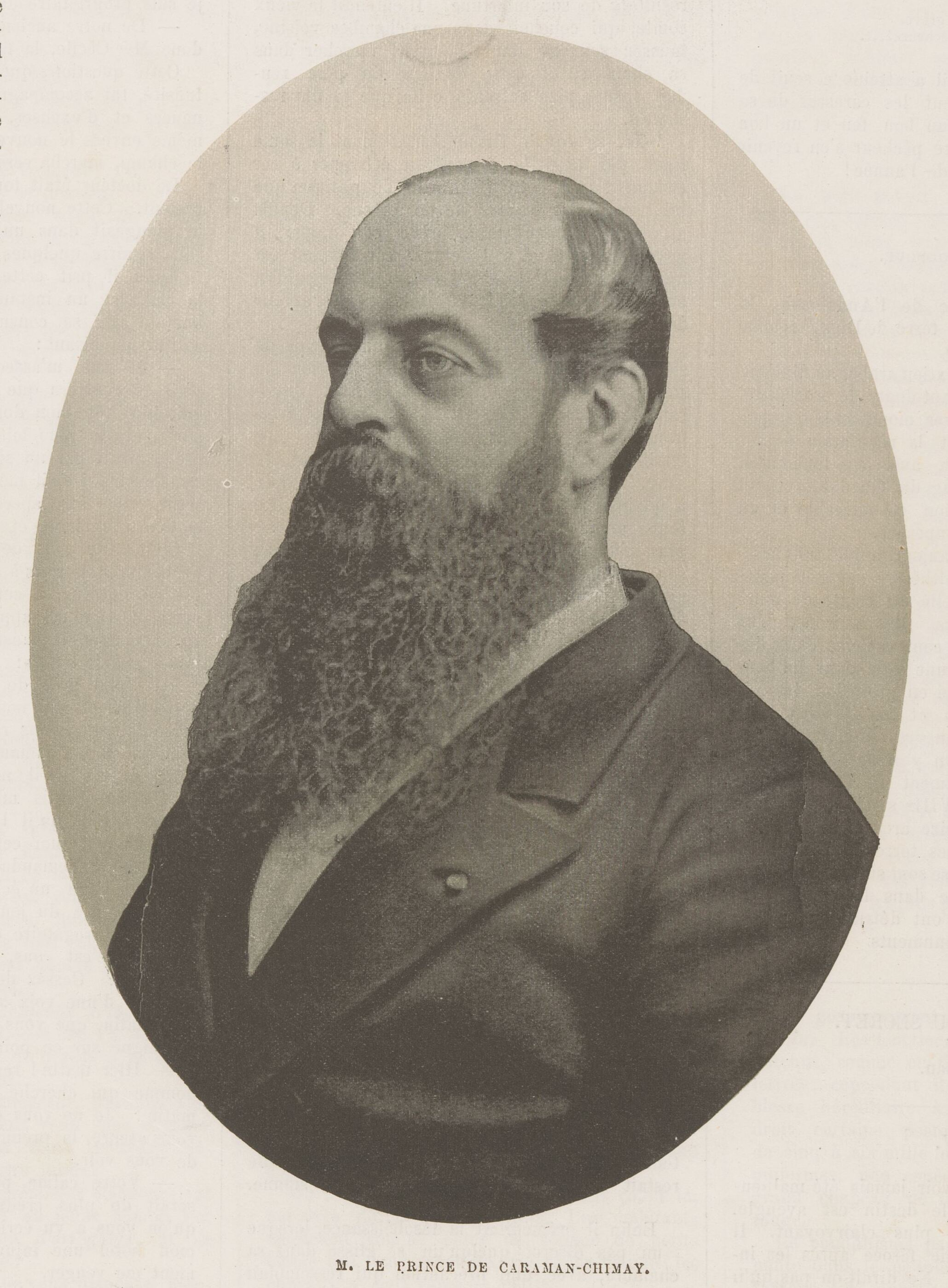

Personal information
- Full name: Marie Joseph Anatole Élie de Riquet
- Born: 4 July 1858 Paris, France
- Died: 25 July 1937 (aged 79) Chimay, Hainaut, Belgium
- Spouses: Clara Ward (m. 1890; div. 1897) Anne Marie Charlotte Amélie Gilone Le Veneur de Tillières (m. 1920)

Sport
- Sport: Fencing

Achievements and titles
- Olympic finals: 1900

Marie Joseph Anatole Élie de Riquet et de Caraman, 19th Prince de Chimay (4 July 1858 – 25 July 1937), known as Joseph de Caraman-Chimay, the younger, was a Belgian aristocrat and fencer. He was titled "Prince de Chimay" from 1892 until his death in 1937.

== Early life ==
He was born to Joseph de Riquet, Prince de Chimay and Prince de Caraman (of Belgium), and Marie Joséphine Anatole de Montesquiou-Fézensac. Named for its Belgian "château de Chimay", his family was noted for its patronage of music and the arts. One of his sisters was Élisabeth de Riquet de Caraman-Chimay, the Countess Greffulhe.

== Career ==
In 1897, the Prince and Georges Clemenceau (then the President of the Council of Paris, later the Prime Minister of France), fought a duel with swords over an article published by Clemenceau in L'Écho de Paris. "Both were wounded simultaneously, Clemenceau receiving a gash in the right arm and the Prince a slight scratch on the shoulder."

The Prince de Chimay was a competitor representing France in the individual épée event at the 1900 Summer Olympics. In 1903, he was injured in a car accident near the village of Rocroi while trying to avoid a cyclist. The car he was in overturned and his chauffeur was killed while he was seriously injured.

In 1935, only his collection of art and historic documents and one wing of his château (which housed a theatre created by Madame Tallien, wife of the 16th Prince de Chimay) were saved when a fire burned the castle.

== Personal life ==
On 19 May 1890 he married sixteen-year-old American heiress Clara Ward, a daughter of Capt. Eber Brock Ward. Together, they were the parents of two children:

- Marie Anatole Catherine Elisabeth, Comtesse de Caraman-Chimay (1891–1939), who married Georges De Cocq in 1918.
- Joseph Marie Pierre Anatole Alphonse de Riquet (1894–1920)

They were divorced on 19 January 1897, after Clara's widely publicized elopement with a gypsy violinist, Janos Rigo. In 1908, he attempted to obtain an annulment of his marriage from the Vatican. By a second marriage to Anne Marie Charlotte Amélie Gilone Le Veneur de Tillières (1889–1962) on 24 June 1920, he had two more children:

- Joseph Marie Alexandre Pierre Ghislain, 20th Prince de Chimay, Prince de Caraman (1921–1990), who resigned the princely title to his brother upon becoming a U.S. citizen; married Germaine Hélène Jeanne van der Meulen in 1946, but died without issue.
- Élie Marie Charles Pierre Paul, 21st Prince de Chimay, Prince de Caraman (1924–1980), who married Marie Elisabeth Marthe Antoine Manset in 1947 and had issue.

The Prince de Chimay died on 25 July 1937 in Chimay, Hainaut, Belgium.
