= Élisabeth de Chimay =

French-born Belgian princess and writer (1926–2023)

- Born: Martha Marie Élisabeth Antoine Manset; 20 March 1926; Bordeaux, France
- Died: 2 August 2023 (aged 97); Chimay, Belgium
- Occupation: Writer

Martha Marie Élisabeth Antoine de Chimay (née Manset; 20 March 1926 – 2 August 2023) was a French-born Belgian writer and princess. She wrote a work on Thérésa Tallien as well as an autobiography.

== Biography ==
Born in Bordeaux on 20 March 1926, she was the daughter of Octave Manset and Marie-Charlotte Guestier, whose families were involved in the Bordeaux wine business. Her parents died in a car accident in 1939 and her brother, Édouard, died in 1940 during World War II. On 18 December 1947, she married Élie de Riquet, Prince de Chimay, a descendant of Pierre-Paul Riquet, the engineer responsible for constructing the Canal du Midi. They had three children: Philippe (born 1948), Marie-Gilone (born 1950), and Alexandra (born 1952).

A close friend of Fabiola of Belgium, de Chimay immersed herself in the heritage of the De Riquet de Caraman family and preservation of the archives of the Chimay Castle. She also held a Baroque music festival from 1957 to 1980.

Élisabeth de Chimay died in Chimay on 2 August 2023, at the age of 97.

== Publications ==
- La Princesse des Chimères (1993)
- La Fin d'un siècle, souvenirs (2000)

== Distinctions ==
- Commander of the Ordre national du Mérite
- Knights of the Ordre des Arts et des Lettres
