= List of protected heritage sites in Chimay =

This table shows an overview of the protected heritage sites in the Walloon town Chimay. This list is part of Belgium's national heritage.

Object	Year/architect	Town/section	Address	Coordinates	Number^{?}	Image
Theatre of the castle of Chimay ^{(nl)} ^{(fr)}		Chimay	Chimay	50.048789°N 4.312705°E	56016-CLT-0001-01 Info	Theater van kasteel van Chimay
Oak tree called "Quatres Chêne des Frères" at a place called "Les Fagnes" in the forest of Rance, called "Bois Massart" ^{(nl)} ^{(fr)}		Chimay		50.123037°N 4.254792°E	56016-CLT-0003-01 Info	Eik genaamd "Chêne des Quatres Frères" op een plaats genaamd "Les Fagnes" in het bos van Rance, de zogenaamde "Bois Massart"
Church of Saint-Pierre et Saint-Paul ^{(nl)} ^{(fr)}		Chimay	Chimay	50.049394°N 4.315718°E	56016-CLT-0004-01 Info	Kerk Saint-Pierre et Saint-Paul
Old tower of Chimay ^{(nl)} ^{(fr)}		Chimay	Chimay	50.049229°N 4.317080°E	56016-CLT-0005-01 Info	Oude toren van Chimay
Chapel Notre-Dame de Miséricorde ^{(nl)} ^{(fr)}		Chimay	Boulevard Louise, Chimay	50.044818°N 4.314818°E	56016-CLT-0006-01 Info	Kapel Notre-Dame de Miséricorde
Ensemble of the building and surrounding areas ^{(nl)} ^{(fr)}		Chimay	rue des Forges n°2	50.046564°N 4.314266°E	56016-CLT-0007-01 Info	Ensemble van het gebouw en de omliggende terreinen
Notre Dame Church and the churchyard wall of Boutonville, and the ensemble of the church, the cemetery, the square and the road around ^{(nl)} ^{(fr)}		Chimay	Baileux	50.037419°N 4.392778°E	56016-CLT-0008-01 Info	Kerk Notre-Dame en de kerkhofmuur van Boutonville, en het ensemble van de kerk, het kerkhof, het plein en de weg rondom
St. Martin's Church ^{(nl)} ^{(fr)}		Chimay	Baileux	50.029717°N 4.375364°E	56016-CLT-0009-01 Info	Kerk Saint-Martin
Linden tree in front of the property of M. Masuy ^{(nl)} ^{(fr)}		Chimay	Forges-les-Chimay	50.018320°N 4.319807°E	56016-CLT-0010-01 Info	
village Lompret ^{(nl)} ^{(fr)}		Chimay	Chimay	50.064962°N 4.380755°E	56016-CLT-0013-01 Info	Dorp Lompret
Chapel Notre-Dame de l'Arbrisseau of Notre Dame del Pilar and the ensemble of the building and its surroundings ^{(nl)} ^{(fr)}		Chimay	Chimay	50.061886°N 4.265739°E	56016-CLT-0014-01 Info	Kapel Notre-Dame de l'Arbrisseau of Notre-Dame del Pilar en het ensemble van het gebouw en diens omgeving
Site of the Bois Franc ^{(nl)} ^{(fr)}		Chimay	Chimay	50.061019°N 4.379401°E	56016-CLT-0015-01 Info	Site van het Franc Bois
Lime tree at the place called "Moulin à vent" ^{(nl)} ^{(fr)}		Chimay	Chimay	50.063634°N 4.239999°E	56016-CLT-0017-01 Info	
Calcium rich grassland near the lake Virelles ^{(nl)} ^{(fr)}		Chimay	Chimay	50.069073°N 4.346356°E	56016-CLT-0019-01 Info	Kalkrijke grasland in de buurt van het meer Virelles
Castle of Chimay: namely the walls, the tower and the walls and roofs of the castle, with the exclusion of modern extensions to the courtyard, and the platform of the fortress. Establishment of a protection zone around it ^{(nl)} ^{(fr)}		Chimay		50.048702°N 4.312692°E	56016-CLT-0020-01 Info	Kasteel van Chimay: meer bepaald de muren, de toren en de gevels en daken van het kasteel, met uitsluiting van de moderne uitbreidingen aan de binnenplaats, en het platform van de vesting. Oprichting van een beschermingszone rondom
Theatre of the Castle of Chimay ^{(nl)} ^{(fr)}		Chimay		50.048789°N 4.312705°E	56016-PEX-0001-01 Info	Theater van het kasteel van Chimay
Site of Bois Franc ^{(nl)} ^{(fr)}		Chimay		50.061019°N 4.379401°E	56016-PEX-0002-01 Info	

== See also ==
- List of protected heritage sites in Hainaut (province)
- Chimay
