= Joseph-Marie Canivez =

Belgian historian of the Cistercian order and monk

Dom Joseph-Marie, born Ovide Ernest Ursmer Ghislain Canivez (1878–1952), was a Belgian historian of the Cistercian order and a monk of Scourmont Abbey.

== Life ==
Canivez was born in Binche on 20 November 1878. He was educated at Bonne-Espérance junior seminary (in the former Bonne-Espérance Abbey) and in September 1899 entered the Trappist monastery at Scourmont, taking the name Joseph-Marie. In 1905 he made his final vows on 25 April and was ordained priest on 8 October. In 1913-1914 he studied canon law in Rome.

In 1926 he began to publish historical research into the history of his order, particularly in Belgium. He died at Scourmont Abbey in Forges-lez-Chimay on 24 November 1952.

== Writings ==
Canivez contributed 351 entries to the Dictionnaire d'histoire et de géographie ecclésiastiques, including those on Bernard of Clairvaux and Cîteaux Abbey, and was also a contributor to the Dictionnaire de droit canonique. His other works include:

- L'Ordre de Cîteaux en Belgique des origines (1132) au XXe siècle (Forges-lez-Chimay, 1926).
- "Auctarium D. Caroli De Visch ad Bibliothecam scriptorum Sacri Ordinis Cisterciensis", Cistercienser Chronik, 38 (1926), pp. 153-232.
- Nicolas Tillière, Histoire de l'abbaye d'Orval, 3rd edition revised by Joseph-Marie Canivez (Gembloux, 1927)
- as editor, Statuta capitulorum generalium ordinis Cisterciensis ab anno 1116 ad annum 1786 (8 vols., Louvain, 1933-1941)
- "Étonnantes concessions pontificales faites à Cîteaux", in Miscellanea historica in honorem Alberti de Meyer, vol. 1 (Louvain, 1946), pp. 505-519.
- "Le rite cistercien", Ephemerides liturgicae, 63 (1949), pp. 276-311.
