= Bernard de Give =

Belgian priest (1913–2020)

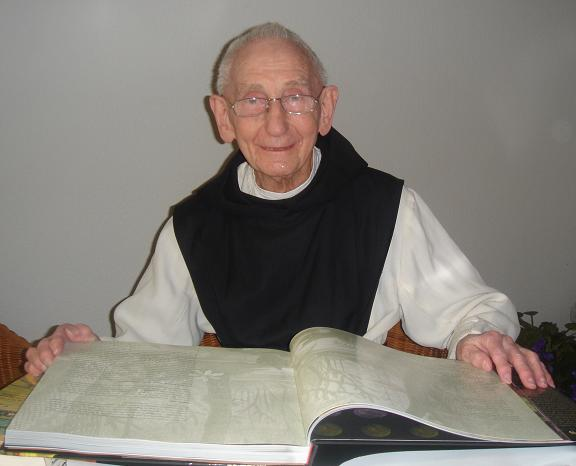
- Born: 8 May 1913; Liège, Belgium
- Died: 27 January 2020 (aged 106)
- Occupations: Priest; Writer

Bernard de Give (8 May 1913 – 27 January 2020) was a Belgian priest and writer who became a monk of Scourmont Abbey.

== Biography ==
After his secondary studies at Collège Saint-Servais in Liège, de Give joined the Society of Jesus on 23 September 1931. He earned a degree in philosophy at the Faculté de Philosophie S.J. in Egenhoven, and later a degree in philosophy from Université catholique de Louvain. During his studies, he became fluent in Sanskrit and learned of Eastern religions under the direction of Étienne Lamotte. De Give was ordained on 27 July 1944.

De Give left Belgium for India on 26 January 1947. He taught ancient philosophy, ecclesiastical studies, and classical studies at the Pontifical Seminary of Kandy in Sri Lanka for six years. He served as a professor in several Indian cities, including Ranchi, Hazaribagh, Kodaikanal, and Poona.

He returned to Belgium in 1955, taking courses in classical studies at the Juvénat de La Pairelle in Wépion. He then published Greek and Latin textbooks, and became a professor of philosophy at the Faculté SJ d'Eegenhoven-Louvain, then at the Université de Namur. In the 1970s, de Give took courses at the University of Oxford under the direction of Robert Charles Zaehner. He interacted with Chögyam Trungpa at the university.

De Give joined the Trappists at Scourmont Abbey on 2 June 1972. In 1977, he became a founding member of Monastic Interreligious Dialogue. He took place in interfaith meetings at Praglia Abbey in 1977 and 1979. He spent ten years studying the Tibetan Language at the Temple of One Thousand Buddhas in France. He helped organize the Christian-Buddhist colloquial at the Shangpa Karma Ling Institute. He would take several trips to Tibetan centers across Western Europe, and made a trip to Tibet in July 1994. He published his doctoral thesis, titled Les rapports de l'Inde et de l'Occident des origines au règne d'Aśoka, in 2005. On his 100th birthday, 8 May 2013, Scourmont Abbey published a collection of his poems, titled Quand l'âme chante....

Bernard de Give died on 27 January 2020 at the age of 106.

== Works ==
- Chronicon Alnense. Chronique d'Aulne de dom Norbert Herset (1977-1978)
- Registre des choses advenues à l'abbaye d'Aulne (1980)
- L'Imitation de Jésus-Christ traduite et paraphrasée en vers par Pierre Corneille (1998)
- Les rapports de l'Inde et de l'Occident des origines au règne d'Asoka (2005)
- A Trappist Meeting Monks from Tibet (2009)
- Grammaire latine (2011)
- Quand l'âme chante... (2013)
