= Lake Virelles =

Lake in Belgium

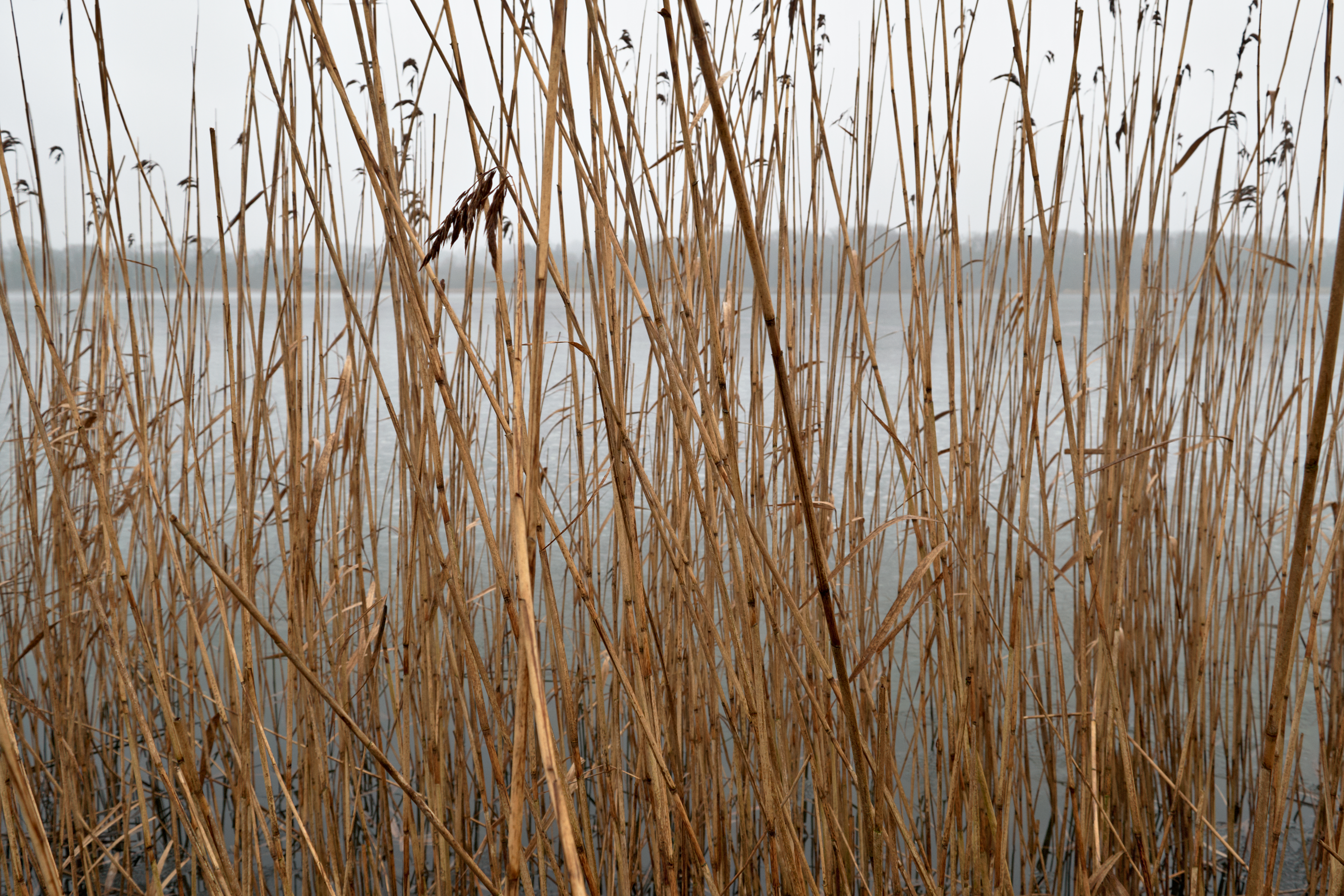

- Location within Belgium
- Coordinates: 50°04′20″N 04°20′35″E
- Type: Freshwater artificial lake
- Basin countries: Wallonia, Belgium
- Max. length: 2.3 km (1.4 mi)
- Max. width: 1 km (0.62 mi)
- Surface area: 1.25 km^{2} (0.48 sq mi)
- Surface elevation: 204 m (669 ft)
- Islands: 0
- Settlements: Chimay

Lake Virelles is an artificial lake in Wallonia near the city of Chimay in Belgium. The lake is an important nature reserve with a great number of birds. The lake covers 1,25 km².
