= Georges Hostelet =

Belgian chemist, mathematician and sociologist (1875 - 1960)

- Born: 1 April 1875; Chimay, Belgium
- Died: 4 November 1960 (aged 85)
- Education: University of Liège (PhD in Physical and Chemical Sciences, 1905)
- Scientific career
- Fields: Chemistry, Sociology, Mathematics, Philosophy
- Workplaces: University of Liège

Georges Hostelet (1875–1960) was a Belgian chemist, sociologist, mathematician, and philosopher. He was born in the municipality of Chimay in 1875. He attended the Royal Military Academy, and reached the rank of lieutenant. In 1897, he left the academy and enrolled in the University of Liège, where he received his doctorate in 1905. two years later, Hostelet began work with the Solvay & Cie Company as a chemical engineer and worked closely with Ernest Solvay. In 1911, he attended the First Solvay Conference, eventually becoming its last surviving participant.

Years later, Hostelet became opposed to the First World War. During the war, he worked alongside English nurse Edith Cavell and was imprisoned by the occupying German forces, later being released in 1917. In 1919, he accepted an offer from Solvay to become co-director of the Solvay Institute of Sociology; a position he held until he left in 1922 when Solvay died. Hostelet left Belgium in 1925 as part of a Franco-Belgian mission to teach social sciences at the University of Cairo. He returned in 1931 and was appointed as a member of the International Statistical Institute in the Hague the following year. He continued teaching at the University of Antwerp until he retired in 1947. He died in 1960.
