= Scourmont Abbey =

Trappist Abbey in Belgium

Coordinates: 49°58′56″N 4°20′10″E

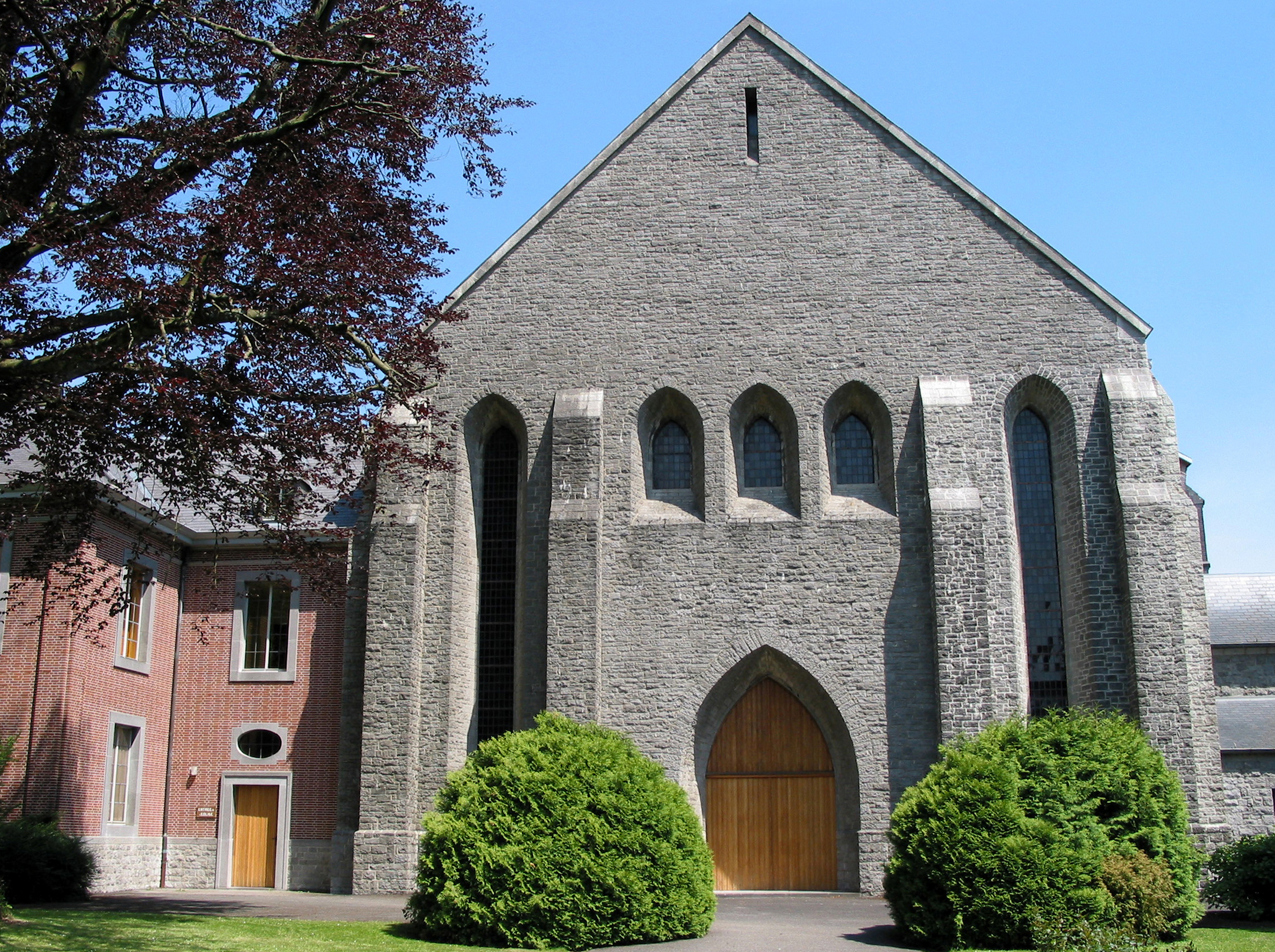
Scourmont Abbey church

Scourmont Abbey (Abbaye Notre-Dame de Scourmont) is a Trappist monastery on the Scourmont plateau, in the village of Forges which is part of Chimay in the province of Hainaut, Belgium. The abbey is famous for its spiritual life and for running the Chimay Brewery, one of the few producers of Trappist beer.

Life in the abbey is characterised by prayer, reading and manual work, the three basic elements of Trappist life.

== History ==
In 1844, Jean-Baptiste Jourdain, the priest of Virelles, suggested that the wild plateau of Scourmont was a suitable place for a monastery. However, all previous attempts to cultivate the barren plateau had failed. Fr. Jourdain obtained support for the proposed foundation from Prince Joseph II de Chimay, the abbot of Westmalle Abbey and Westvleteren Abbey. Six years later, on 25 July 1850, a small group of monks from Westvleteren settled on Scourmont and founded a priory.

The monks founded a school and model farm to train orphans and abandoned children, and to rehabilitate delinquents. In 1859 the first prior of Scourmont, Modeste Decroix (Fr François in religion) was removed from office and sentenced to twenty years hard labour on multiple counts of sexual assault. A second member of the community received a ten-year sentence on similar charges. Two other members of the community had already received short prison sentences for physically abusing students in the school. On 7 October 1860 François Robyn (Br Hugo in religion) set fire to the church, library, and a new dormitory after being reprimanded for breaking his vow of silence. He was sentenced to death at the Court of assizes in Mons the following February.

A lot of hard work was required to transform the barren soil of Scourmont into fertile farmland. A farm was created around the monastery, as well as a cheese dairy and a brewery. On 24 February 1871, Pope Pius IX granted the priory the status of abbey and it was inaugurated on 7 July 1871. Since then other monasteries have been founded by Scourmont, such as Caldey Abbey on Caldey Island in Pembrokeshire, Wales, which was taken over from the Benedictines who moved to Prinknash Abbey (December 1928) and Notre Dame de Mokotoin near Goma (Kivu, former Belgian Congo) (February 1954).

The present church of the abbey dates from 1950.

== Chimay products ==
The famous beers and cheeses of Scourmont Abbey are marketed under the trade name of Chimay, after the village where the abbey is located.

== Notable members ==
- Joseph-Marie Canivez, who joined the community in 1899 and made his final vows in 1905, would go on to become a noted monastic historian.
- Bernard de Give, a Jesuit philologist and philosopher, joined the community in 1977.

== See also ==
- Chimay Abbey

== Sources ==
- Van Remoortere, J., 1990: Ippa's Abdijengids voor Belgie, pp. 188–191. Lannoo
