= Qaraman =

- Municipality
- Location within Azerbaijan
- Coordinates: 40°36′N 47°49′E
- Country: Azerbaijan
- Rayon: Goychay

Population
  - Total: 788
- Time zone: UTC+4 (AZT)
  - Summer (DST): UTC+5 (AZT)

Qaraman (also, Karaman) is a village and municipality in the Goychay Rayon of Azerbaijan. It has a population of 788.
