= Forges, Belgium =

Village near Chimay, Wallonia, Belgium

Forges (French pronunciation: [fɔʁʒ]; Walloon: Foidjes) is a village of Wallonia and a district of the municipality of Chimay, located in the province of Hainaut, Belgium.

It was a municipality of its own until January 1, 1977.

The Trappist abbey Notre-Dame de Scourmont and the source of the river Oise are located near Forges.

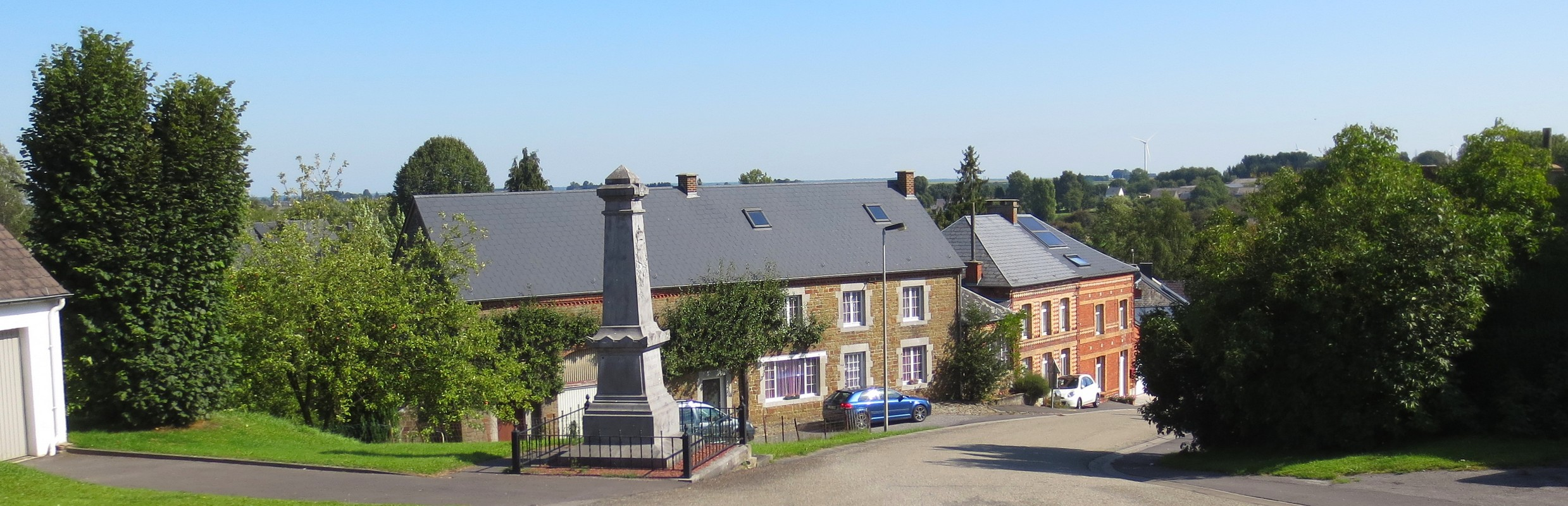
Forges
