= Pierre-Paul Riquet =

French engineer (1609–1680)

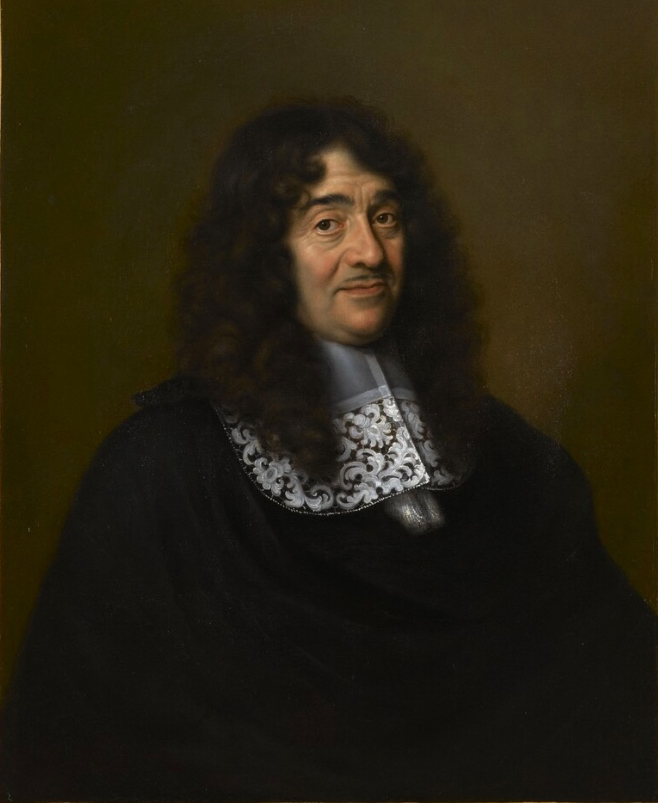
Portrait of Pierre-Paul Riquet

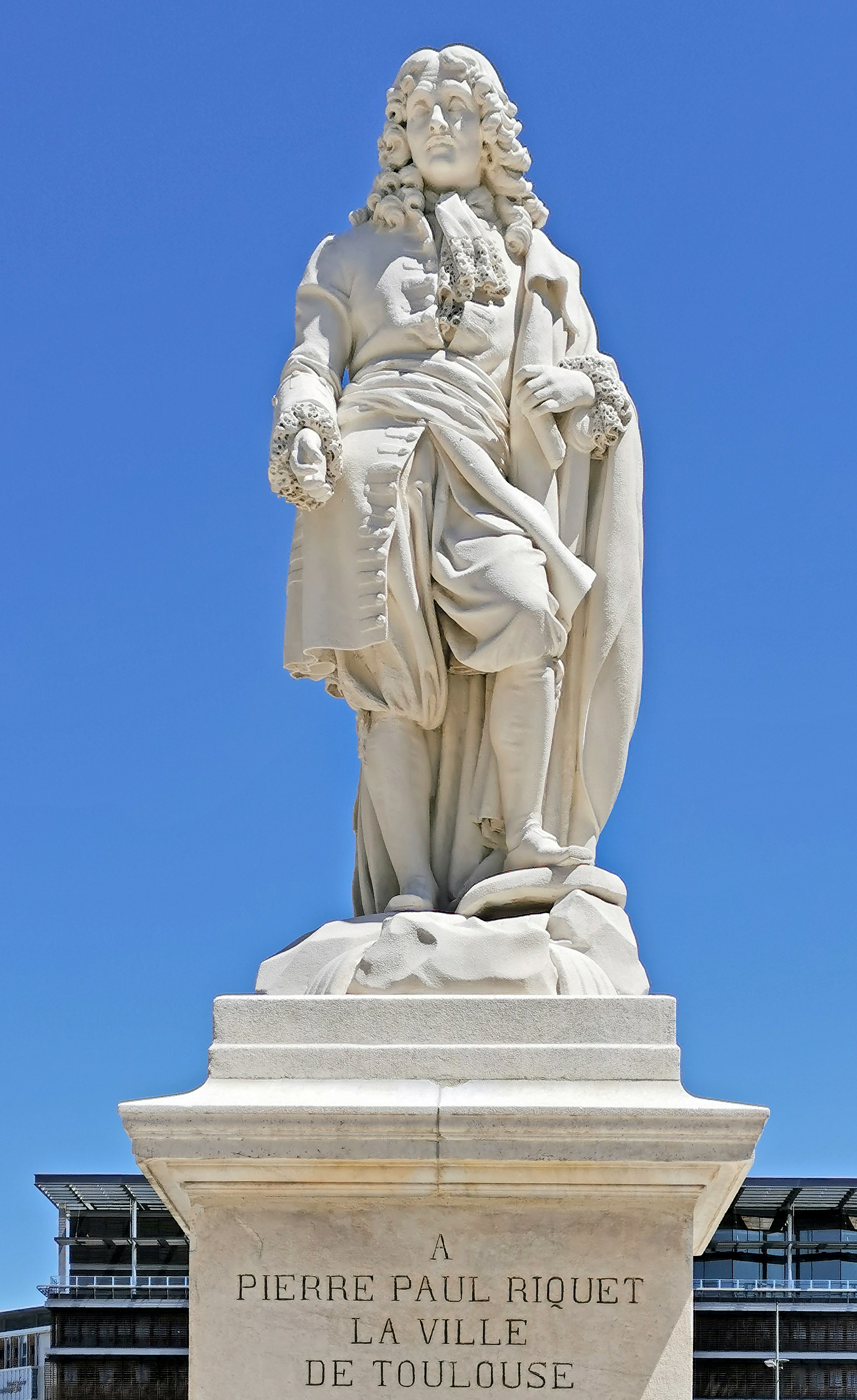
A statue of Pierre-Paul Riquet in Toulouse

Pierre-Paul Riquet, Baron de Bonrepos (French pronunciation: [pjɛʁ pɔl ʁikɛ]; 29 June 1609 (some sources say 1604) – 4 October 1680) was the engineer and canal-builder responsible for the construction of the Canal du Midi.

== Early life ==
Born as Paul Riquet in Béziers, Languedoc, France, he was the eldest son of solicitor, state prosecutor and businessman François-Guillaume Riquet. As a youth, Riquet was only interested in mathematics and science.

== Career ==
As a fermier général ("farmer-general") of Languedoc, he was a tax farmer responsible for the collection and administration of the gabelle (salt tax) in Languedoc. He was appointed collector in 1630, and was also a munitions provider to the Catalan Army. Riquet became wealthy and was given permission by the King to levy his own taxes. This gave him greater wealth, which allowed him to execute grand projects with technical expertise.

In 1651, he bought the Château de Bonrepos, next to Verfeil in the northeast of Toulouse.

=== The Canal du Midi ===
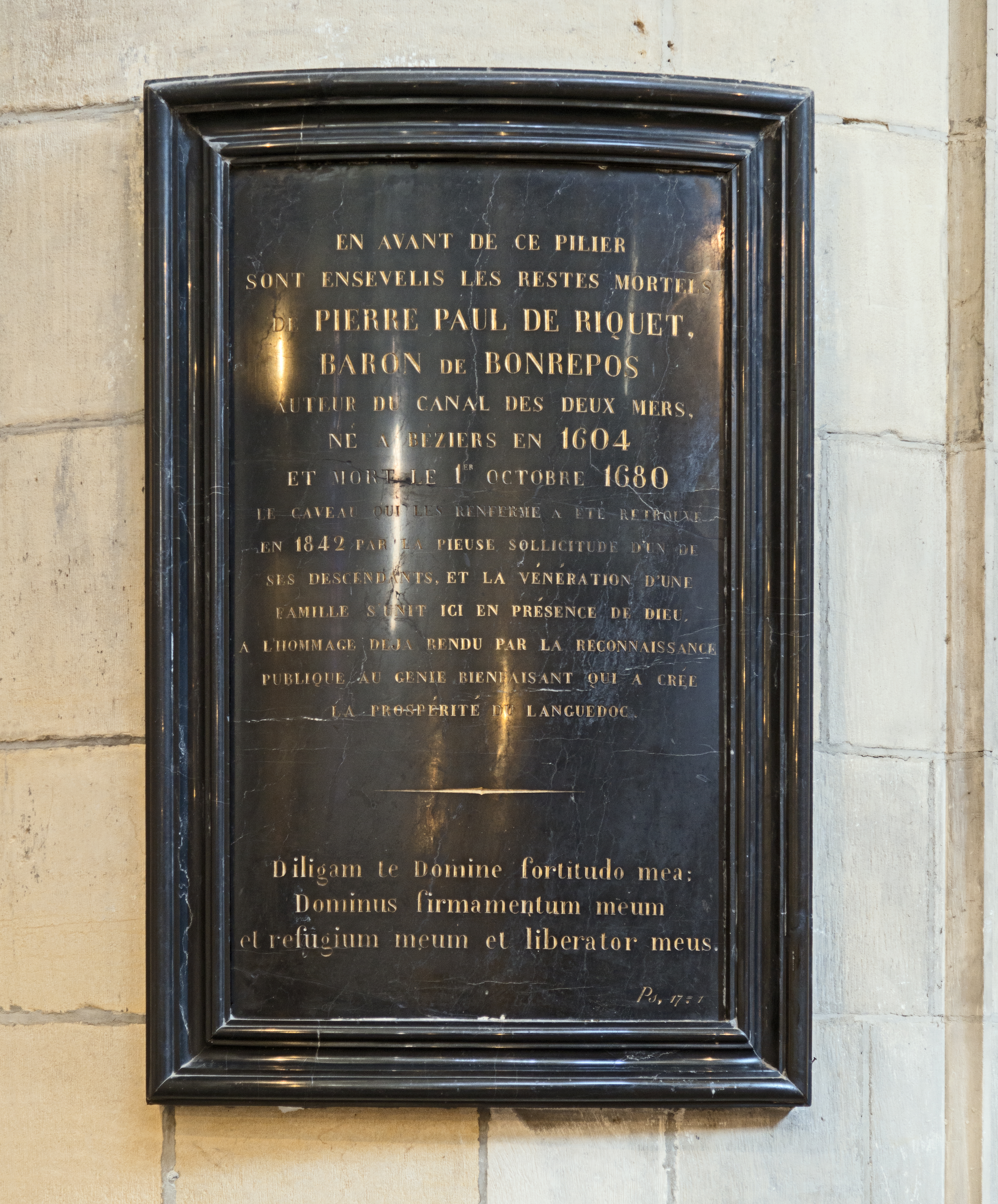
Stele in Toulouse Cathedral

Riquet is the man responsible for building the 240-kilometre-long artificial waterway that links the southern coast of France to Toulouse to link to the canal/river system that ran across to the Bay of Biscay, one of the great engineering feats of the 17th century. The logistics were immense and complex, so much so that other engineers including the ancient Romans had discussed the idea but not proceeded with it. Even so, Louis XIV was keen for the project to proceed, largely because of the increasing cost and danger of transporting cargo and trade around southern Spain where pirates were common.

Planning, financing, and construction of the Canal du Midi completely absorbed Riquet from 1665 forward. Numerous problems occurred, including navigating around many hills and providing a system that would feed the canal with water through the dry summer months. Advances in lock engineering and the creation of a 6 million cubic metre artificial lake, the Bassin de St. Ferréol which harvested water from streams on the Black Mountain near the Naurouze watershed, provided solutions. In 1668, the King placed the canal seigneury up for auction. That is when Riquet acquired ownership and as such, became "Lord of the Canal du Midi."

The high cost of construction depleted Riquet's personal fortune and the seemingly insurmountable problems caused his sponsors, including Louis XIV, to lose interest. Riquet's major engineering achievements included the Fonseranes Lock Staircase and the Malpas Tunnel, the world's first navigable canal tunnel. The canal was completed in 1681, eight months after Riquet's death.

For his achievements, he was created Baron of Bonrepos by King Louis XIV on 20 November 1666. Riquet acquired the seigneury of Caraman for his second son, Pierre-Paul II, and bought him a Brevet Lieutenant General of the Kings Armies in the French Guards. As Pierre-Paul II died without issue, he made his late brother's eldest son, Victor François de Riquet de Caraman (1698–1760), his heir in 1722.

== Personal life ==
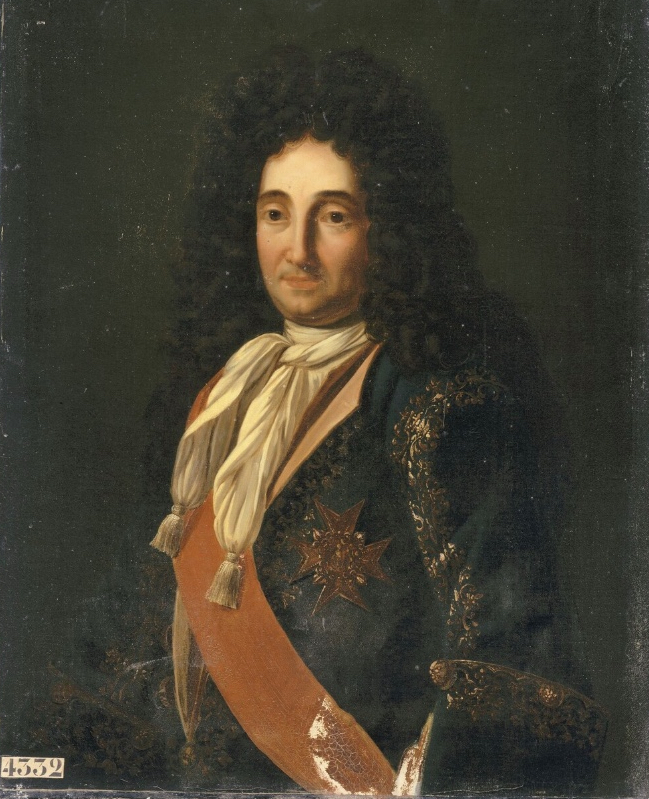
Portrait of his second son, Pierre-Paul II Riquet de Caraman

Around 1637, Riquet married Catherine de Milhau at age 19. Together, they were the parents of seven children, five of whom survived to adulthood, two boys and three girls, including:

- Jean-Mathias de Riquet (1638–1714), who married Marie Madeleine de Broglie, daughter of Victor-Maurice, comte de Broglie. After her death in 1699, he married Marie Louise de Montaigne, a daughter of Nicolas de Montaigne.
- Élisabeth de Riquet (b. 1645)
- Pierre-Paul II Riquet (1646–1730), who acquired the County of Caraman in 1670; he died unmarried.
- Marie de Riquet (1648–1686)
- Catherine de Riquet (1652–1719), who married Jacques de Barthélémy de Gramont Lanta.
- Anne de Riquet (1653–1720)

The Baron died on 4 October 1680. He is buried in the Cathedral Saint-Etienne in Toulouse.

French nobility
New creation	Baron de Bonrepos; 1666–1680	Succeeded by Jean-Mathias de Riquet
