= Prince de Chimay =

Noble title

Prince of Chimay
- Current region: Belgium
- Origin: Chimay in Hainaut
- Estate: Chimay Castle

Prince of Chimay is a title of Belgian and Dutch nobility associated with the town of Chimay in what is now Belgium. The title is currently held by Philippe de Caraman-Chimay, 22nd Prince de Chimay (b. 1948). The main residence of the princely family is Chimay Castle (French: Château de Chimay), which is located in the town of Chimay in the Hainaut province of Belgium.

== Counts of Chimay ==
- Jean II de Croÿ, comte de Chimay (1395–1473)
- Philippe de Croÿ, comte de Chimay (1437–1482)
- Charles de Croÿ, comte de Chimay (1455–1527); elevated to the rank of prince in 1486

== Princes of Chimay ==
=== House of Croÿ ===
1. Charles I of Croÿ, 1st Prince of Chimay (1455–1527)

  1. 2. Anne de Croÿ, princesse de Chimay;
    married to Philippe II de Croÿ, duc d'Arschot (1496–1549)
    1. 3. Charles II of Croÿ, 3rd Prince of Chimay (1522–1551)
    2. 4. Philippe III of Croÿ, 4th Prince of Chimay;
      married to Jeanne of Halewijn.
      1. 5. Charles III of Croÿ, 5th Prince of Chimay;
        married to Marie de Brimeu
      2. 6. Anne of Croÿ, Princess of Chimay;
        married to Charles de Ligne, 2nd Prince of Arenberg

=== House of Arenberg ===
Charles de Ligne, 2nd Prince of Arenberg;
married to Anne of Croÿ, Princess of Chimay

  1. 7. Alexander of Arenberg, 7th Prince of Chimay;
    married to Madeleine of Egmont
- 8. Albert of Arenberg, 8th Prince of Chimay (died 1648)
- 9. Philippe of Arenberg, 9th Prince of Chimay (died 1675)
- 10. Ernest-Dominique of Arenberg, 10th Prince of Chimay (born 1643)
- 11. Anna-Isabella of Arenberg, Princess of Chimay (1616–1658);
  married to Eugène de Hénin, 6th Count of Bossu and Marquess of la Vere

=== House of Hénin-Liétard ===
- 12. Alexandre Gabriel Joseph de Hénin-Liétard, prince de Chimay (1681–1745)
- 13. Thomas Alexandre Marc Henri de Hénin-Liétard, prince de Chimay (1732–1759)
- 14. Thomas Alexandre Marc Maurice de Hénin-Liétard, prince de Chimay (1759–1761)
- 15. Philippe Gabriel Maurice Joseph de Hénin-Liétard, prince de Chimay (1736–1804)

=== House of Riquet de Caraman ===
- 16. François Joseph Philippe de Riquet de Caraman, prince de Chimay (1771–1843)
- 17. Joseph Philippe de Riquet de Caraman, prince de Chimay (1808–1886)
- 18. Marie Joseph Guy Henry Philippe de Riquet de Caraman, prince de Chimay (1836–1892)
- 19. Marie Joseph Anatole Élie de Riquet de Caraman, prince de Chimay (1858–1937)
- 20. Joseph Marie Alexandre Pierre Ghislain de Riquet de Caraman, prince de Chimay (1921–1990) (renounced his titles)
- 21. Élie Marie Charles Pierre Paul de Riquet de Caraman, prince de Chimay (1924–1980);
  married to Élisabeth Manset
- 22. Philippe Joseph Marie Jean de Riquet de Caraman, prince de Chimay (born 1948)

== Prince de Chimay ad personam (1834) ==
- Alphonse de Riquet de Caraman, prince de Chimay (1810–1865)

== Prince de Chimay (1865) ==
- Alphonse de Riquet de Caraman, prince de Chimay (1844–1928)
- Alphonse de Riquet de Caraman, prince de Chimay (1899–1973)

== See also ==
- Chimay Castle
- Hôtel de Chimay
