= Chimay Castle =

Château in Chimay, Hainaut, Wallonia, Belgium

Coordinates: 50.048°N 4.312°E

- Chimay, Hainaut, Wallonia, Belgium
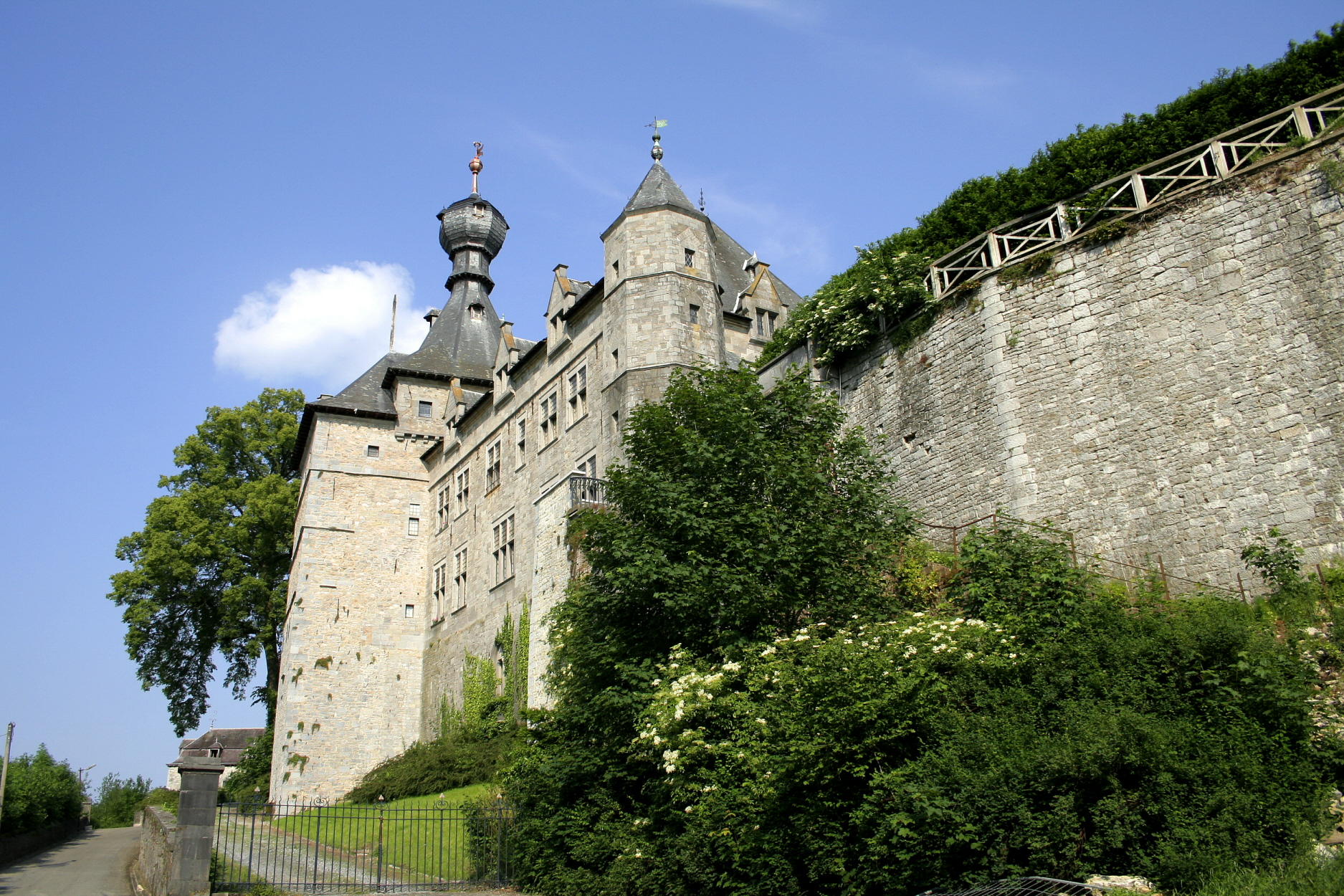

Site information
- Type: Château
- Owner: Prince of Chimay

Site history
- Materials: Stone

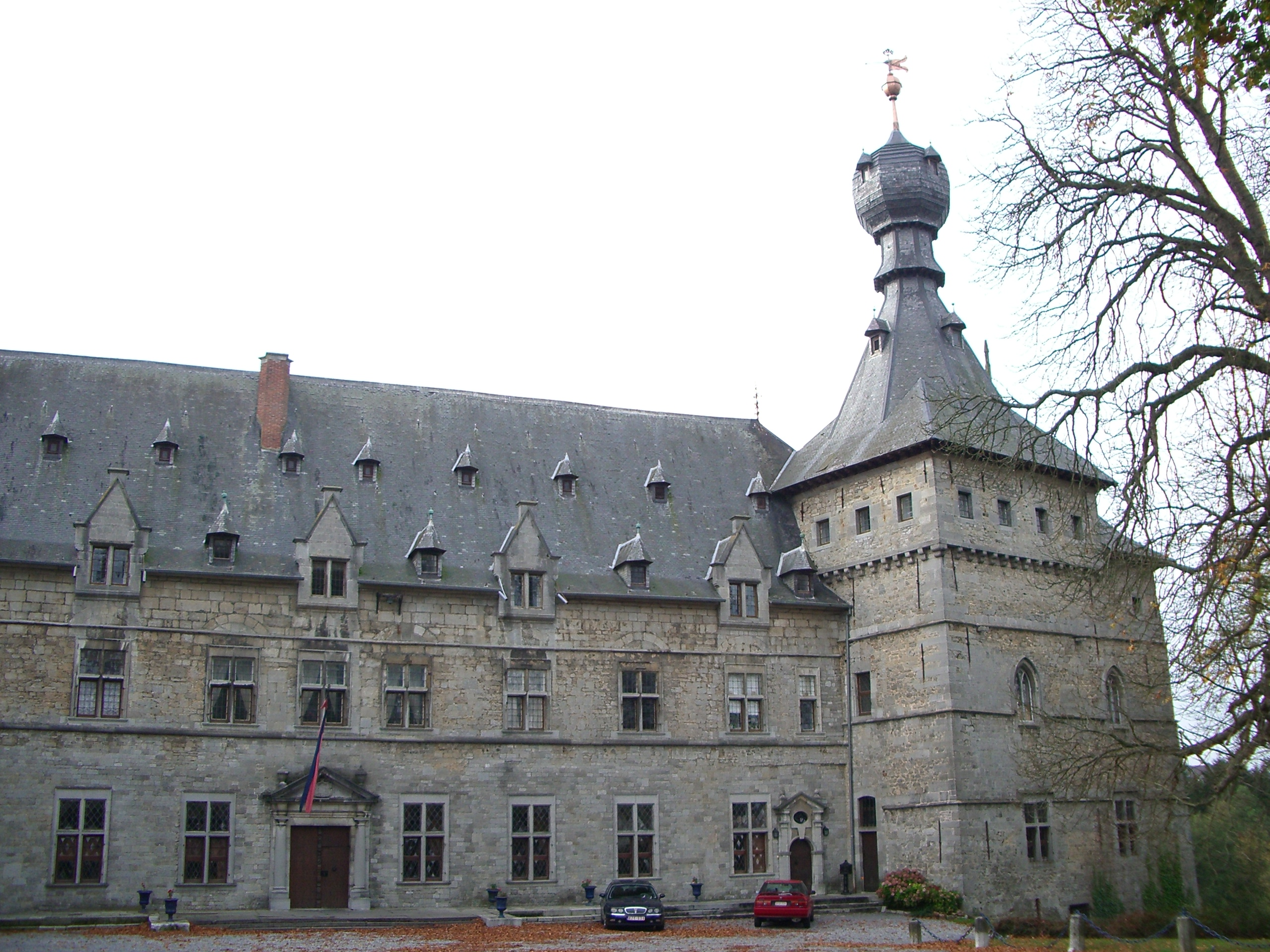
Chimay Castle in 2006

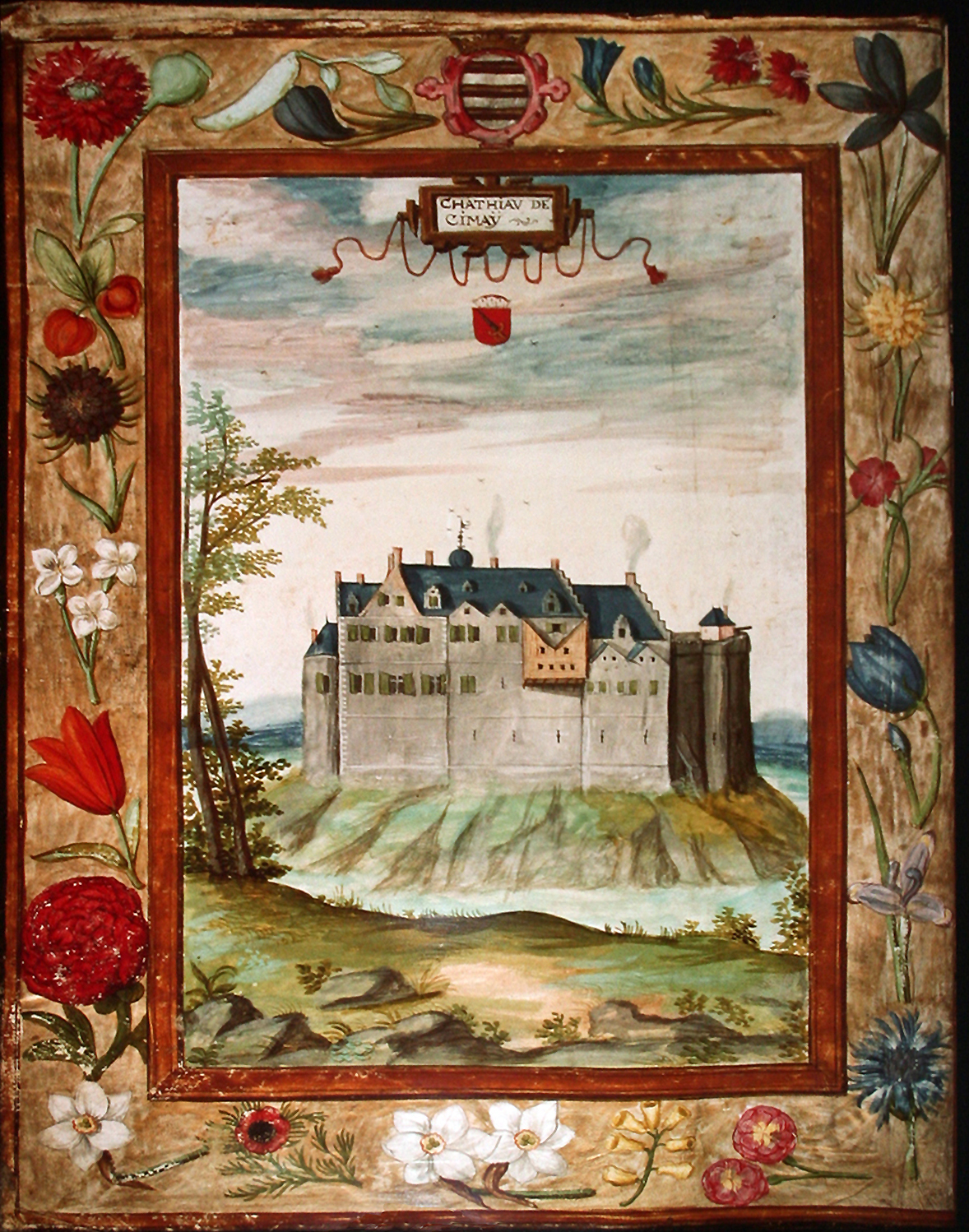
The castle of the princes de Croÿ - Chimay, gouache on parchment made between 1598 and 1602 by Adrien de Montigny

Chimay Castle (French: Château de Chimay) is a château in Chimay, Hainaut, Wallonia, Belgium. The castle has been owned by the Prince of Chimay and his ancestors for centuries, and it is open to the public for tours during part of the year. Although the castle was significantly damaged by a fire in 1935, the structure was subsequently rebuilt, and renovations continue under the current generation of the princely family.

== History ==
Chimay Castle, the home of the Princes of Chimay for many generations, is an ancient stronghold, which some documents suggest may be as old as the year 1000. Through the years, the medieval bastion became a fortress. In the 15th century, the castle was altered: five new towers were linked by corridors to the keep, to increase its defensive potential. Over the centuries, the castle was damaged by many wars, looters and pillagers. Finally, in 1935, a fire destroyed much of what was left, including many irreplaceable works of art. Despite the damage, the princely family decided to rebuild the structure, and repairs have continued since that time.

Initially, writings relate the presence of the town of Chimay in the 11th century, though the settlement may have existed already in the 9th century. An act dating from 1065 and 1070 reveals the presence of Gauthier de Chimay. The strategic position of crossing the Eau Blanche river is a logical explanation for the establishment of an important family on the promontory.

The history of the castle of Chimay is rather vague during the Middle Ages; it seems that the Chimay branch became extinct in 1226. The land then passed to the control of the Counts of Soissons, who held it until 1317, when the castle of Chimay was owned by the Count of Hainaut, then of Blois. Around 1445, it was bought by Jean II de Croÿ from Philip the Good.

Jean II de Croÿ was exiled by Charles the Bold in 1465 and pardoned by him in 1473, leaving descendants of the line of Croÿ to lead the new county of Chimay. The place was at the height of its power in the 15th century: in 1486, Maximilian I, Holy Roman Emperor, erected Chimay into a principality. However, waves of invading Austrian and French troops successively undermined the citadel.

In the 21st century, the castle still stands and is occasionally open to tourists. A recently built mini-golf pitch and musical performances in a 19th-century theatre space attract some visitors.

== See also ==
- List of castles in Belgium
- Prince de Chimay
