= Antoine Portail =

French politician

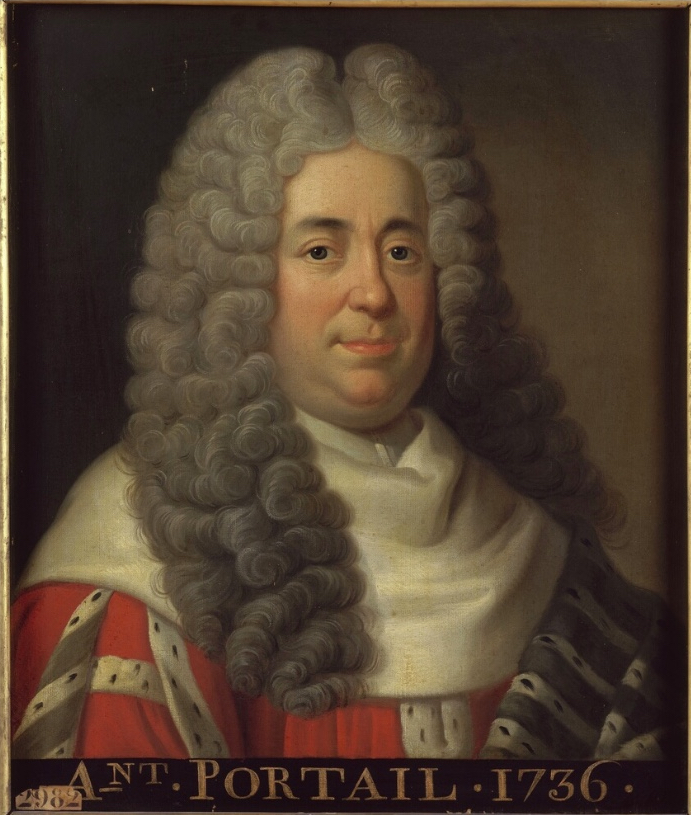
- Copy of an anonymous portrait, Museum of the Palace of Versailles.
- Born: 1675
- Died: 3 May 1736 (aged 60–61)
- Occupation: Politician
- Known for: Member of the French Academy (Seat 17)

Antoine Portail (1675 – 3 May 1736) was a French politician, a First President of the Parlement of Paris, and a member of the French Academy.

== Background ==
To fully understand this article, one must be familiar with the judicial system of France under the Old Regime, during the 17th and 18th centuries. Though the English word parliament derived from the French word parlement, they were not the same thing. A French parlement was closer to an English superior court of appeals. Just as the English parliament is divided into "chambers", a French parlement also had several "chambers". There were over a dozen French parlements throughout the country, the most important of which was in Paris. The highest "chamber" of the Parlement of Paris was the "Great Chamber".

== Biography ==
The son of a member of the Great Chamber, and a student of Charles Rollin, Antoine Portail rose from an attorney, to an attorney general, to the President of the Mortar (chief justice of the Great Chamber), before becoming a First President (a royal appointed position) of the Parlement of Paris in 1724. The same year he was elected to the French Academy. "His natural eloquence and his love of literature," d'Alembert laconically noted, "were his qualifications to the Academy."

He was of great service to Louis XIV and, under the regency of Louis XV, he was appointed, with Guillaume de Lamoignon de Blancmesnil, President of the Chamber of Justice, created in 1716 to audit the country's financial records after 1698, and to prosecute any criminal activity uncovered. Later, he was one of the commissioners named to help the regent resolve the problems created by John Law's General Bank.

"He was," said Barbier, "a magistrate who represented a very beautiful individual, graceful, with an infinite politeness for everyone and full of spirit."

He married the granddaughter of Toussaint Rose.
