= François-Joseph-Philippe de Riquet =

French aristocrat (1771–1843)

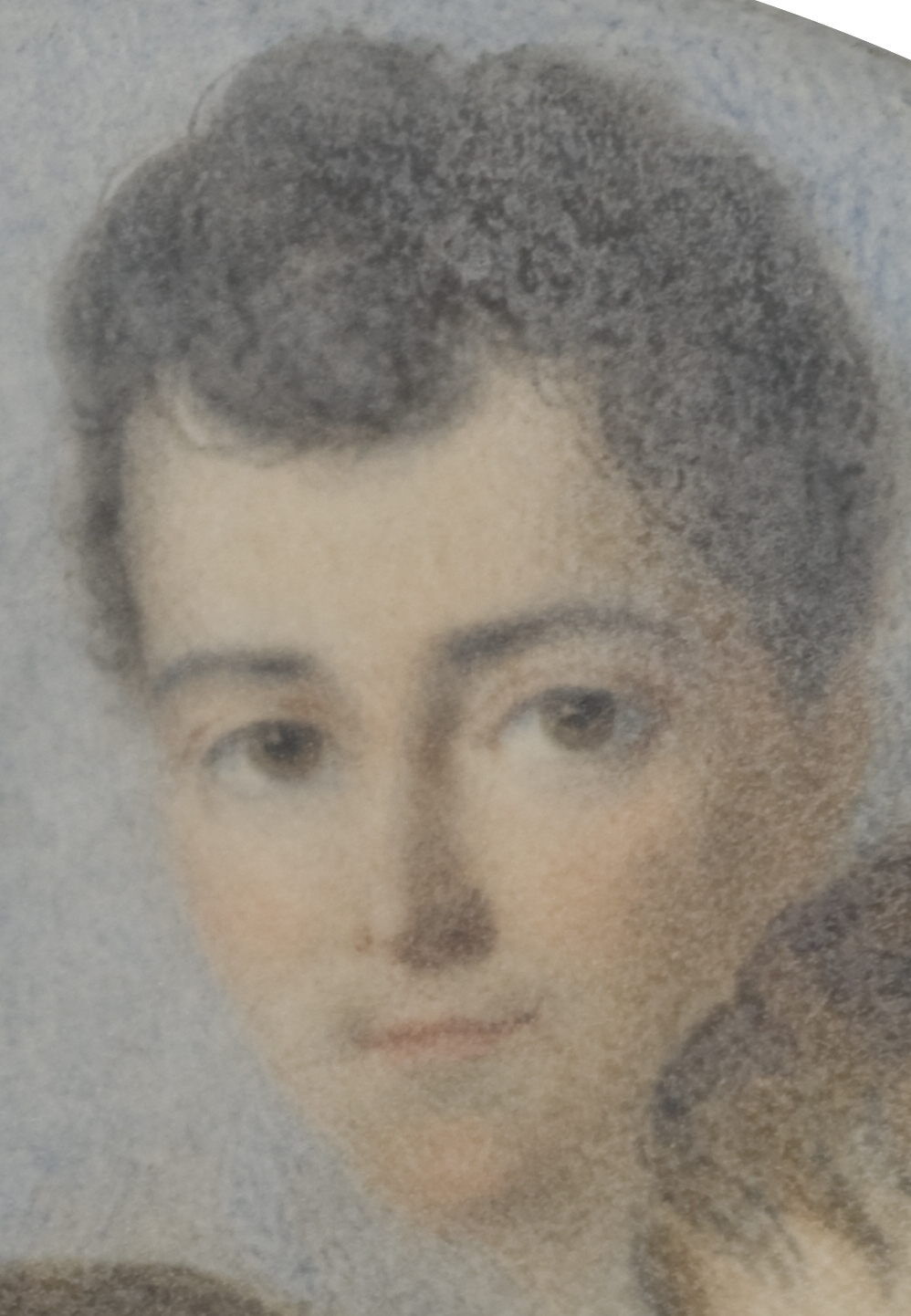
Portrait of the Prince de Chimay, c. 1815

François-Joseph-Philippe de Riquet (21 September 1771 – 2 March 1843), as a French aristocrat who became the 16th Prince de Chimay from 24 July 1804 to 1843.

== Early life ==
François-Joseph-Philippe was born in Paris on 21 September 1771. He was a son of Victor Maurice de Riquet de Caraman-Chimay and Marie Anne Gabrielle Josephe Francoise Xaviere de Henin-Liétard. Among his siblings was Victor-Louis-Charles de Riquet, Marquis de Caraman, a Peer of France who served as the French ambassador in Vienna.

== Career ==
During the French Revolution, he emigrated but came back during the First French Empire, and received the title of chef de cohorte from Napoleon.

He became the sixteenth Prince of Chimay after the death of his childless uncle in 1804, inheriting the Chimay estates (now in Belgium). After the Battle of Waterloo in 1815, these became part of the United Kingdom of the Netherlands and, after 1830, of the current Kingdom of Belgium.

== Personal life ==
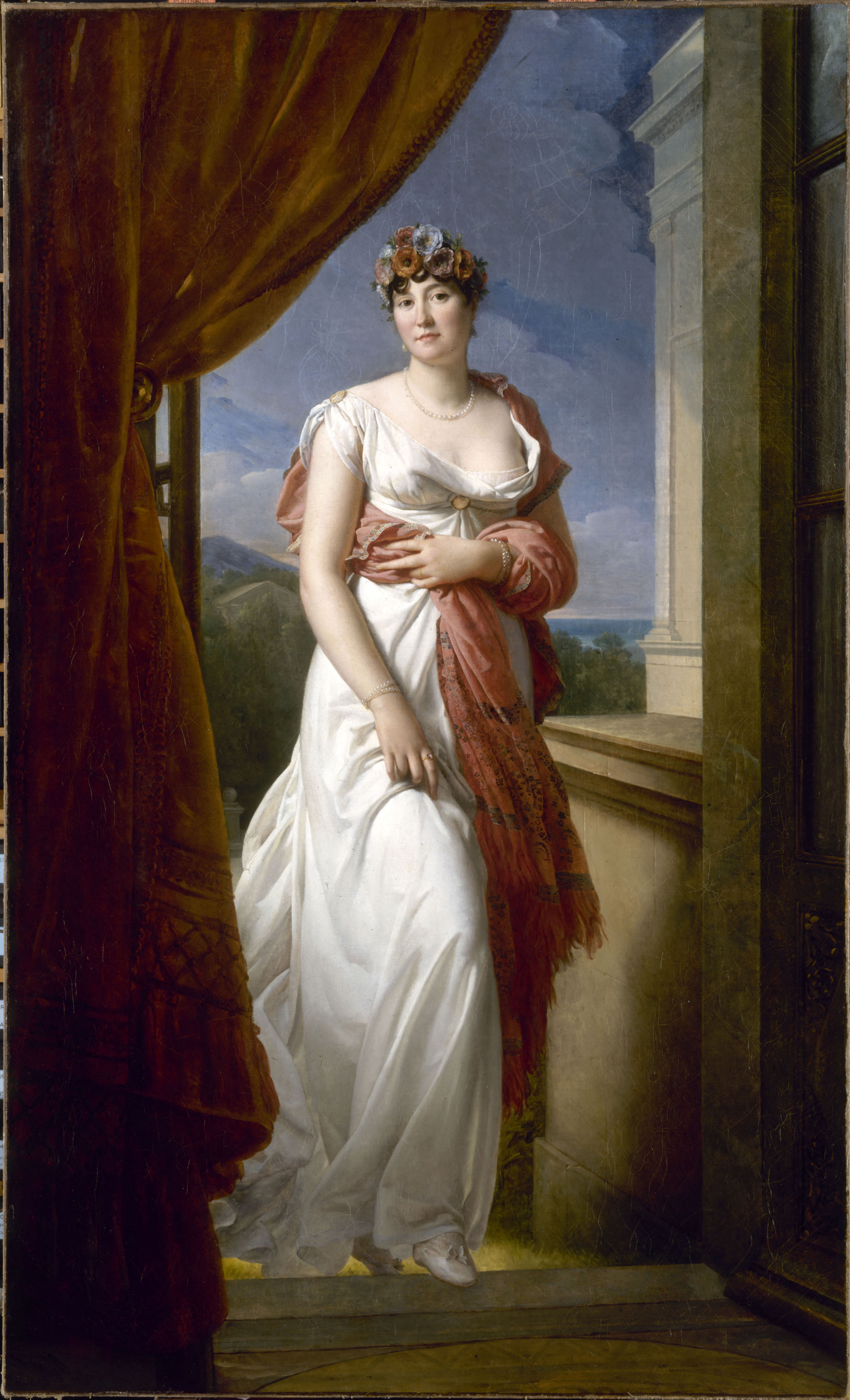
Portrait of his wife, Thérésa de Cabarrus, when she was Princesse de Chimay, by François Gérard, 1804.

On 22 August 1805, he became the third husband of Thérésa de Cabarrus, who was known as Madame Tallien, former wife of Jean Lambert Tallien who bore eleven children by various husbands and lovers. After their marriage, they lived quietly in Hainaut on the Chimay estate (today a province of Belgium). Their children were:

1. Joseph Philippe (1808-1886), 17th Prince de Chimay, Prince de Caraman
2. Michel Gabriel Alphonse Ferdinand (1810-1865) - father of Marie-Clotilde-Elisabeth Louise de Riquet, comtesse de Mercy-Argenteau
3. Marie Auguste Louise Thérèse Valentine (1815-1876)

François-Joseph-Philippe de Riquet died in Toulouse on 2 March 1843. He and Thérésa were interred under the sacristy of the church of Chimay.
