= Caraman, Haute-Garonne =

Caraman Caramanh
- Commune
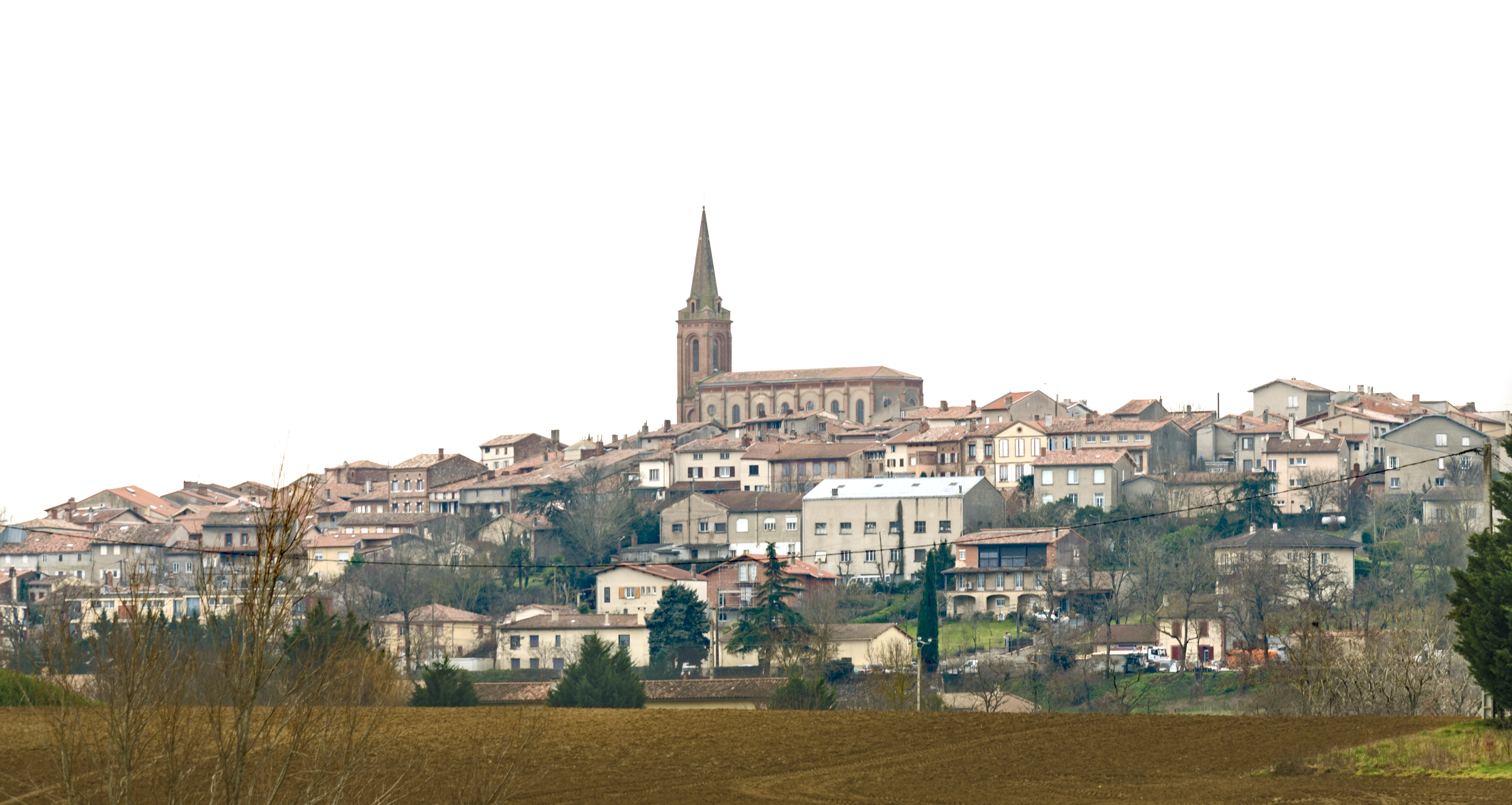
- A general view of Caraman

- Coat of arms
- Location of Caraman
- Location within France Location within Occitanie
- Coordinates: 43°31′52″N 1°45′30″E
- Country: France
- Region: Occitania
- Department: Haute-Garonne
- Arrondissement: Toulouse
- Canton: Revel

Government
  - Mayor (2024–2026): Karine Navarro
- Area^{1}: 30.19 km^{2} (11.66 sq mi)
- Elevation: 275 m (902 ft)
- Highest elevation: 294 m (965 ft)
- Lowest elevation: 175 m (574 ft)
- Population (2023): 2,513
  - Density: 83.24/km^{2} (215.6/sq mi)
- Time zone: UTC+01:00 (CET)
  - Summer (DST): UTC+02:00 (CEST)
- INSEE/Postal code: 31106 /31460
- ^{1} French Land Register data, which excludes lakes, ponds, glaciers > 1 km^{2} (0.386 sq mi or 247 acres) and river estuaries.

Caraman (French pronunciation: [kaʁamɑ̃]; Occitan: Caramanh) is a commune in the Haute-Garonne department in southwestern France.

== Population ==
The inhabitants of the commune are known as Caramanais in French.

Historical population
Year	Pop.	±% p.a.
1968	1,717	—
1975	1,621	−0.82%
1982	1,642	+0.18%
1990	1,765	+0.91%
1999	1,944	+1.08%
2007	2,324	+2.26%
2012	2,366	+0.36%
2017	2,500	+1.11%
2023	2,513	+0.09%
Source: INSEE

== Monuments ==
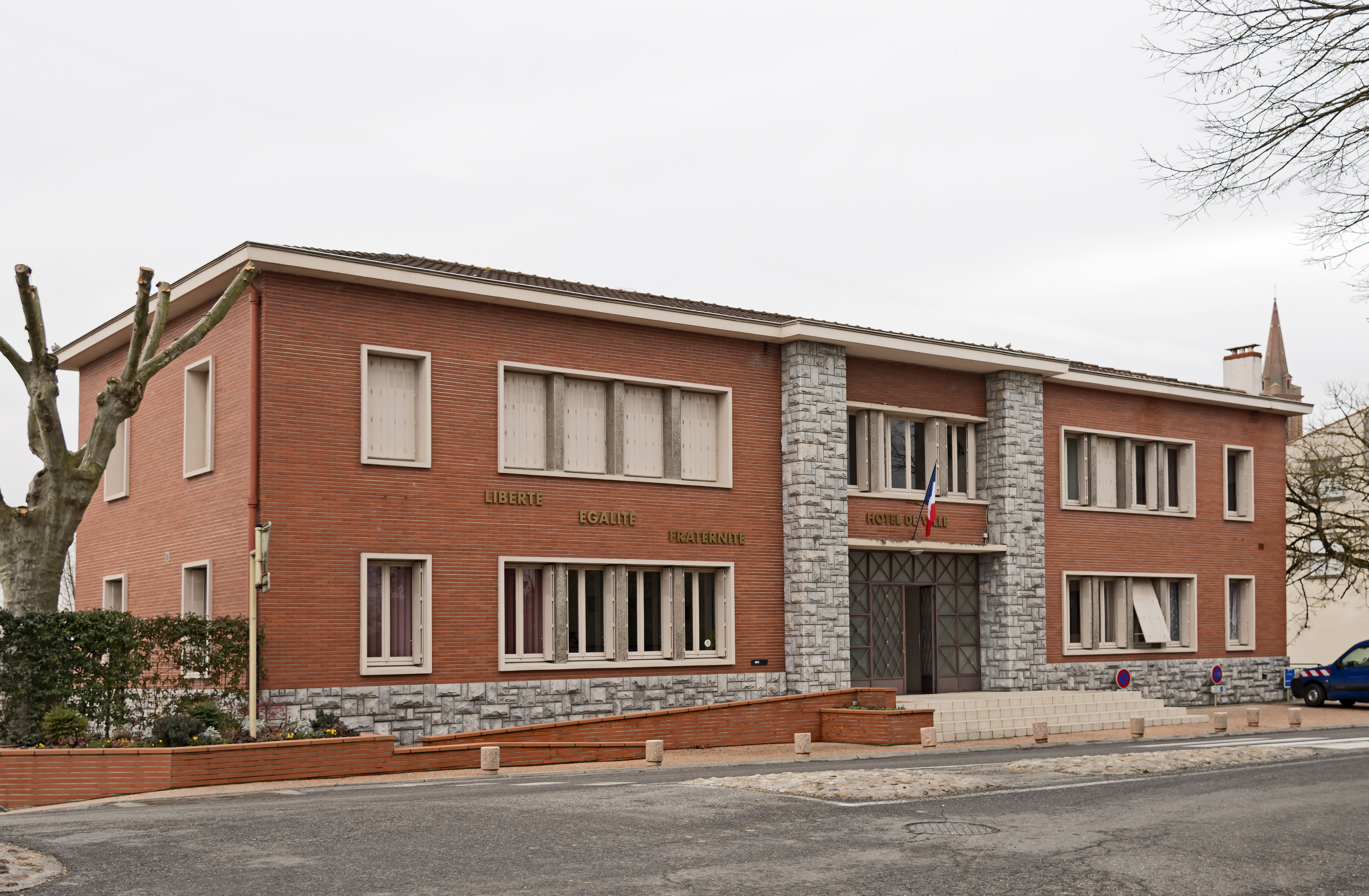
City hall

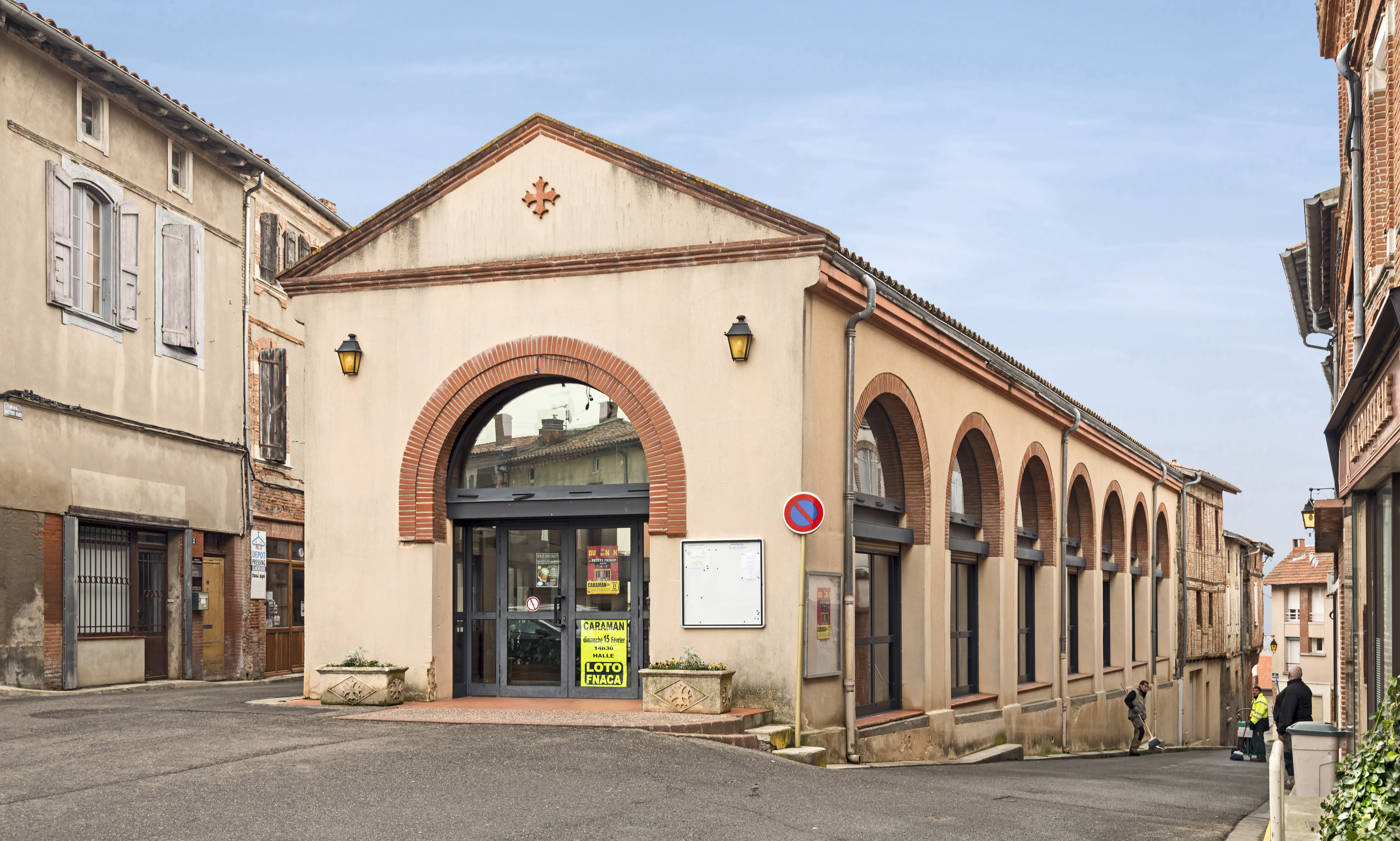
The covered market.

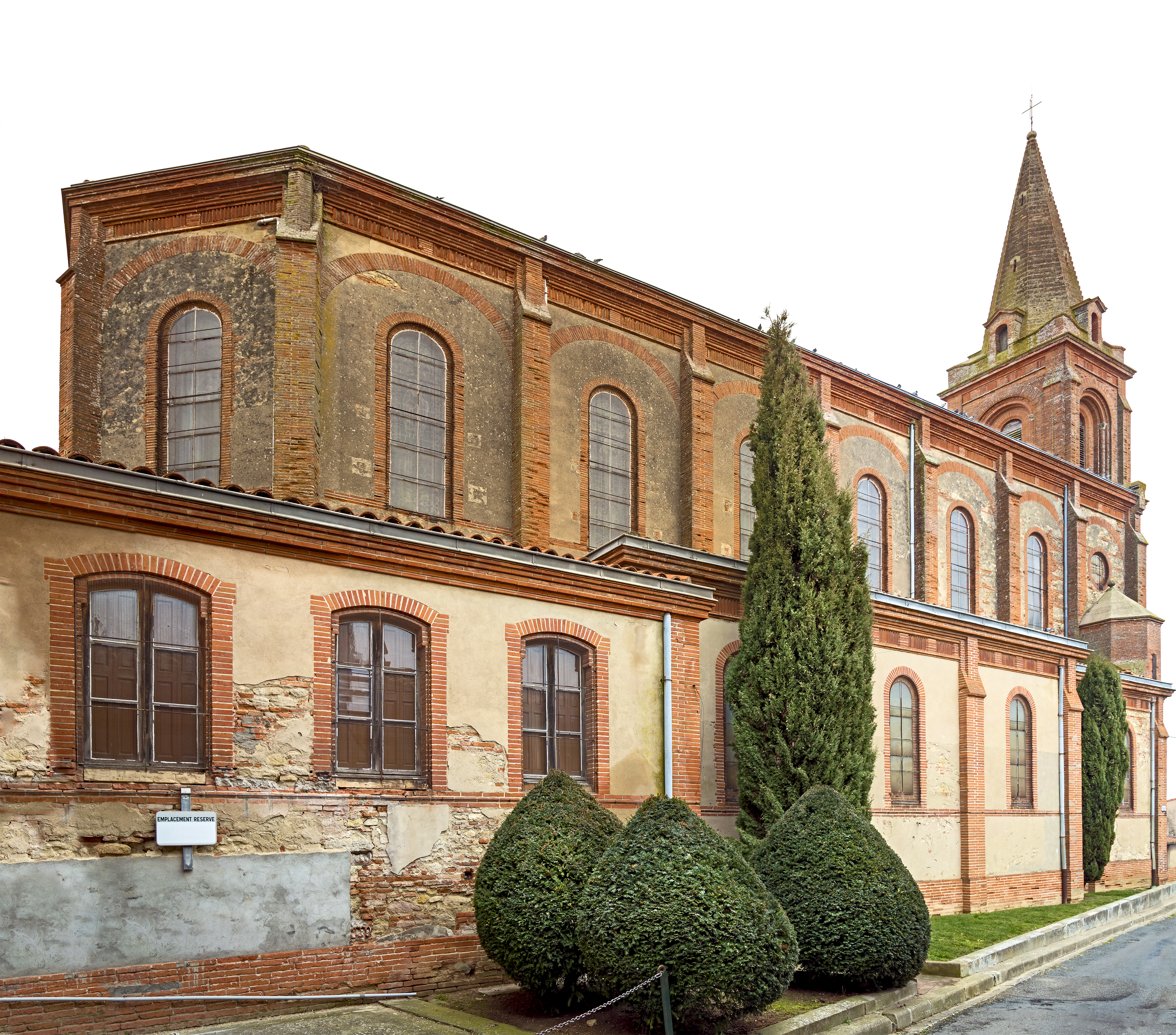
St Peter Church

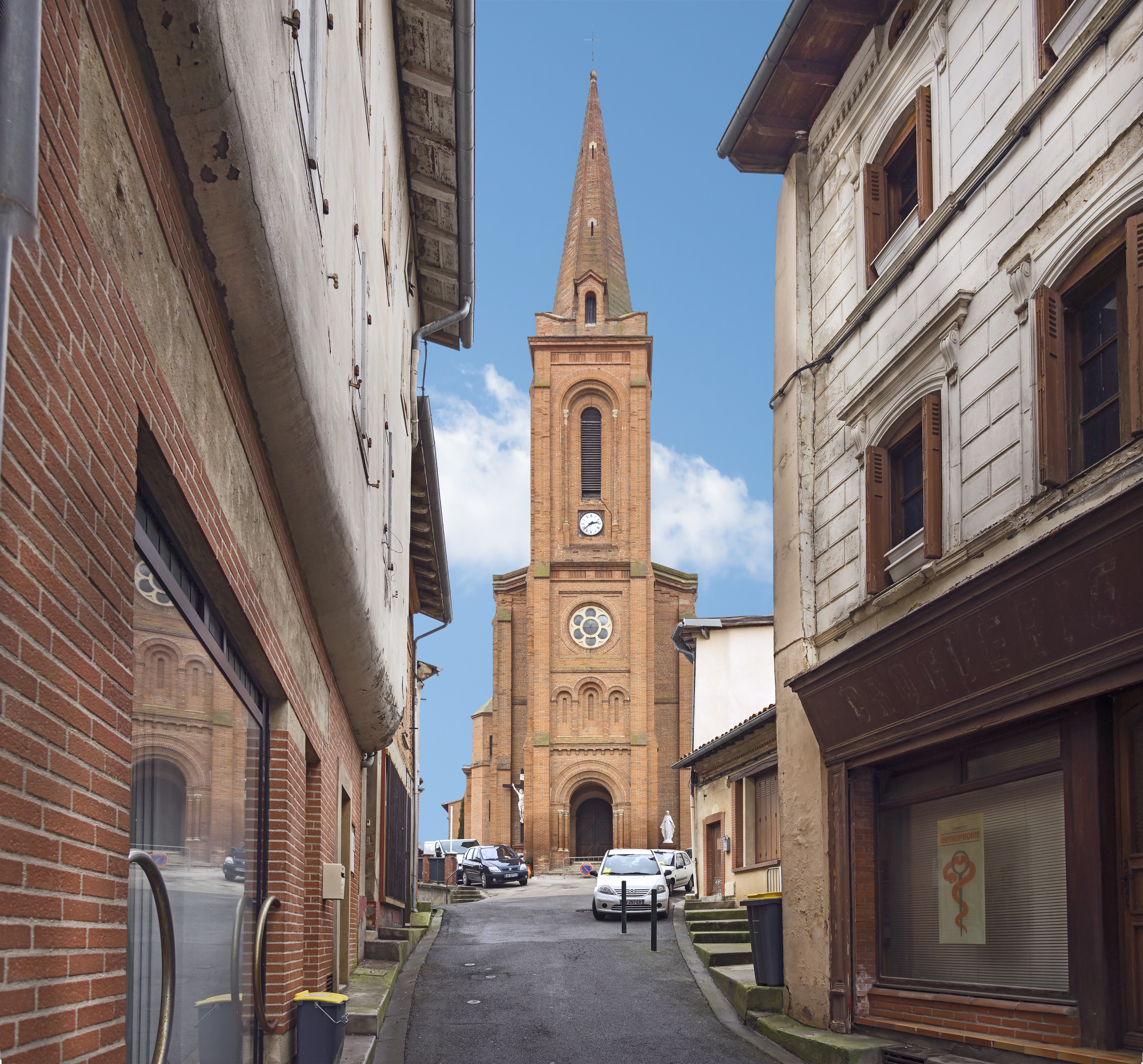
Bell tower

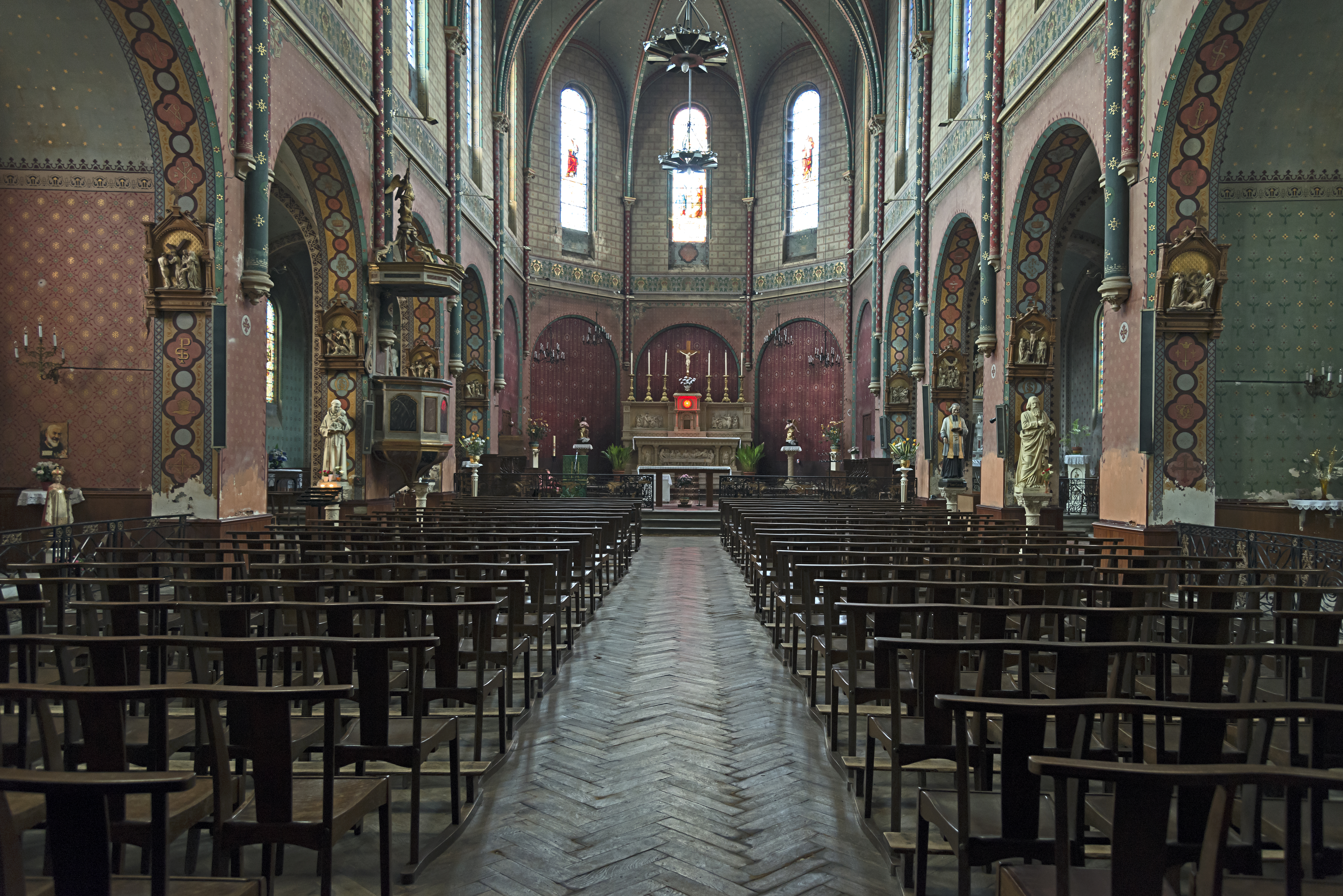
The Nave.

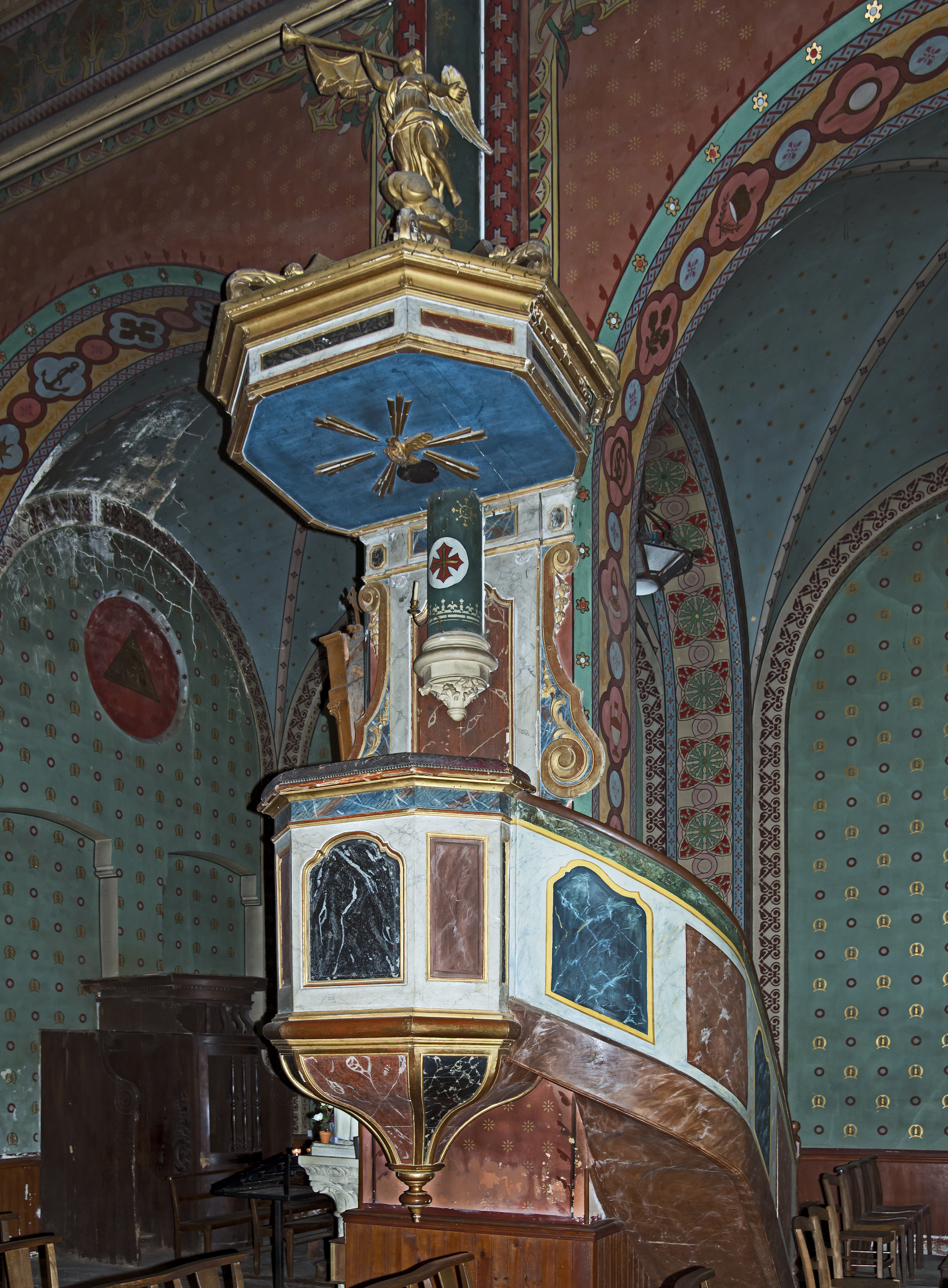
Pulpit

== See also ==
- Communes of the Haute-Garonne department
