= Chimay =

City in Hainaut Province, Wallonia, Belgium

Chimay Chimai (Walloon)
- Municipality
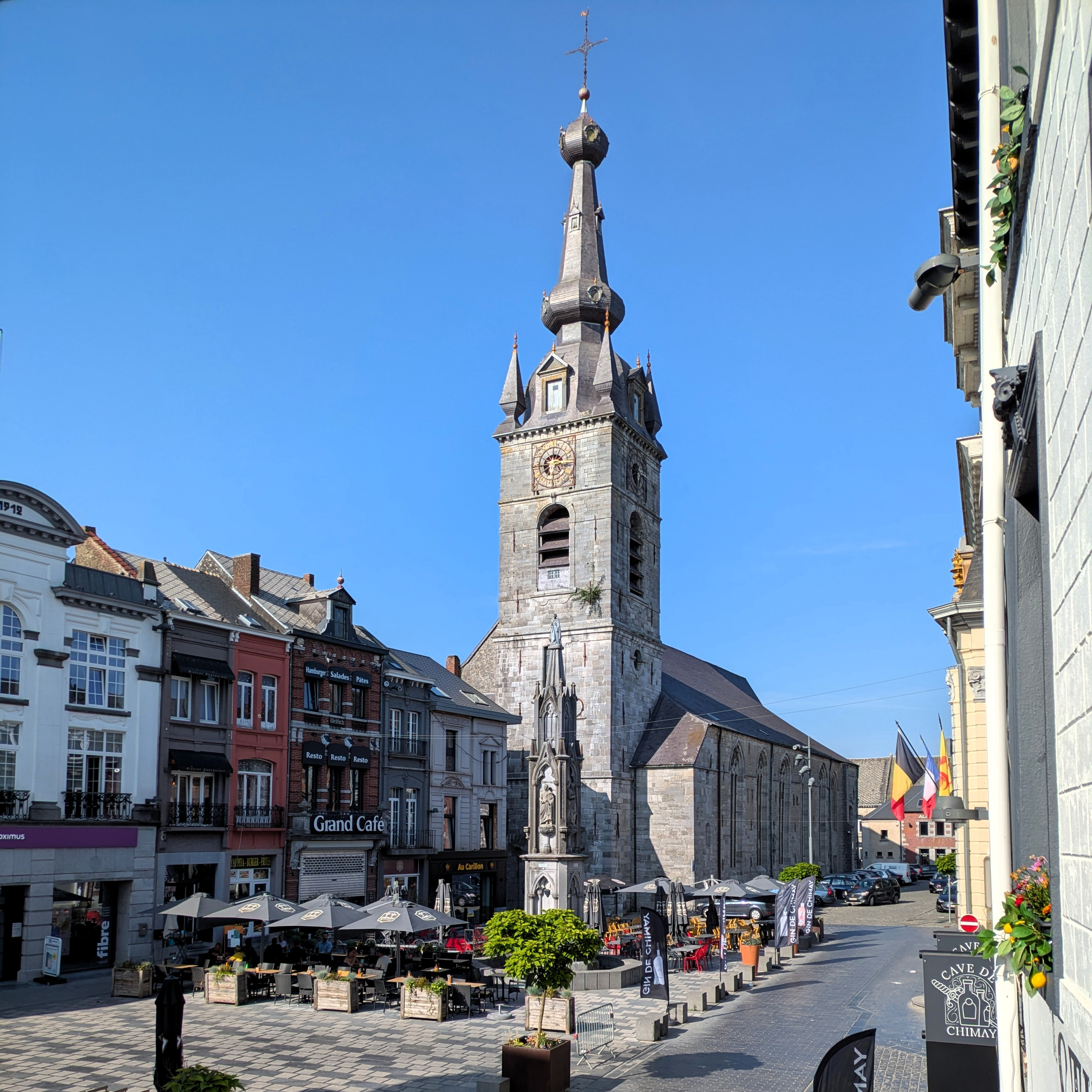
- Chimay: Grand Place

- Flag Coat of arms

- Location of Chimay in Hainaut
- Interactive map of Chimay
- Location in Belgium
- Coordinates: 50°03′N 04°19′E
- Country: Belgium
- Community: French Community
- Region: Wallonia
- Province: Hainaut
- Arrondissement: Thuin

Government
  - Mayor: Denis Danvoye (cdH) (CLE)
  - Governing party: Construisons l'Avenir Ensemble (CLE)

Area
  - Total: 198.6 km^{2} (76.7 sq mi)

Population (2026-01-01)
  - Total: 9,606
  - Density: 48.37/km^{2} (125.3/sq mi)
- Postal codes: 6460, 6461, 6462, 6463, 6464
- NIS code: 56016
- Area codes: 060
- Website: www.ville-de-chimay.be

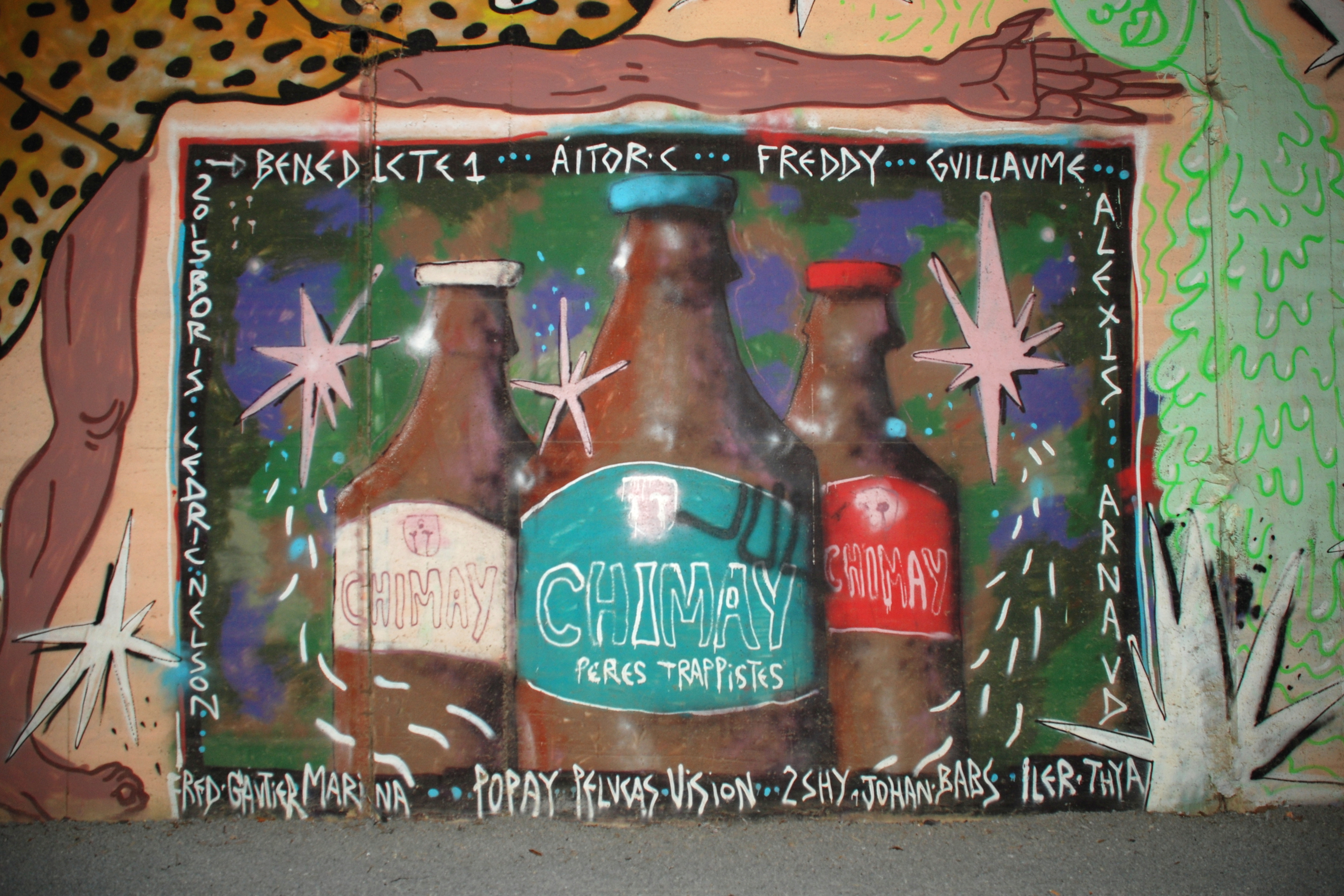
Bottles of Chimay beer represented on a mural of the railway station of Louvain-la-Neuve (Belgium).

Chimay (French pronunciation: [ʃimɛ], Walloon: Chimai) is a city and municipality of Wallonia located in the province of Hainaut, Belgium. In 2006, Chimay had a population of 9,774. The area is 197.10 km^{2} which gives a population density of 50 inhabitants per km^{2}. It is the source of the Oise River.

In the administrative district of Thuin, the municipality was created with a merger of 14 communes in 1977. The Trappist monastery of Scourmont Abbey in the town is famous for the Chimay Brewery.

== Toponymy ==
The etymology of the name is ultimately, via Vulgar Latin, from the Proto-Celtic word koimos meaning "pretty, pleasant".

== Subdivisions ==
The Walloon names of the place names are in brackets and italics.

- Baileux (Balieu)
- Bailièvre (Bailleve)
- Bourlers (Bourlé)
- Chimay (Chimai)
- Forges (Foidjes)
- L'Escaillère (L'Ecayire)
- Lompret (Lompré)
- Rièzes (Rieze)
- Robechies (Robchiye)
- Saint-Remy (Sint-Rmey)
- Salles (Sale)
- Vaulx (Vå)
- Villers-la-Tour (Vilé-al-Tour)
- Virelles (Virele)

== Demographics ==
Year	Population	Change	Density
1904	3,383	—	17.1/km^{2}
2003	9,871	+6,488	50.1/km^{2}
2006	9,774	−22 or −0.23%	49.6/km^{2}
2016	9,850	+76 or +0.78%	50.0/km^{2}

== Attractions ==
- Chimay Castle, the château of the princes of Chimay
- Lake Virelles
- The source of the Oise

Chimay has traditionally hosted an annual motor racing event, run on a street circuit formed from local public roads. From the 1920s to 1960s the event was run for contemporary Grand Prix and sportscar categories, and included the famous Grand Prix des Frontières. In recent times, while the event has persisted it has been run for historic race series. The track briefly lost its licence in 2006 related to safety fears, but has since had it reinstated.

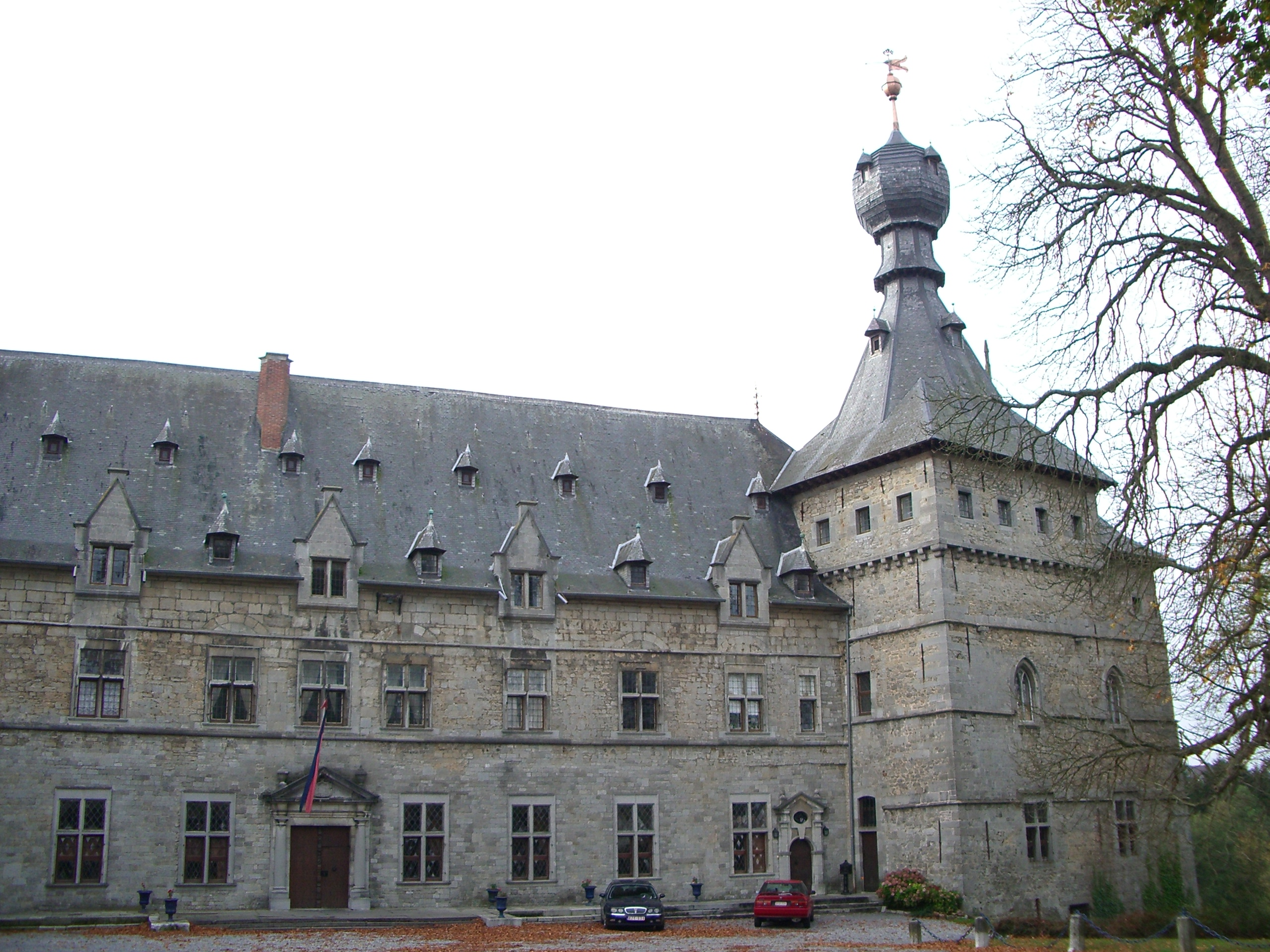
Chimay Castle

The central town square, Chimay

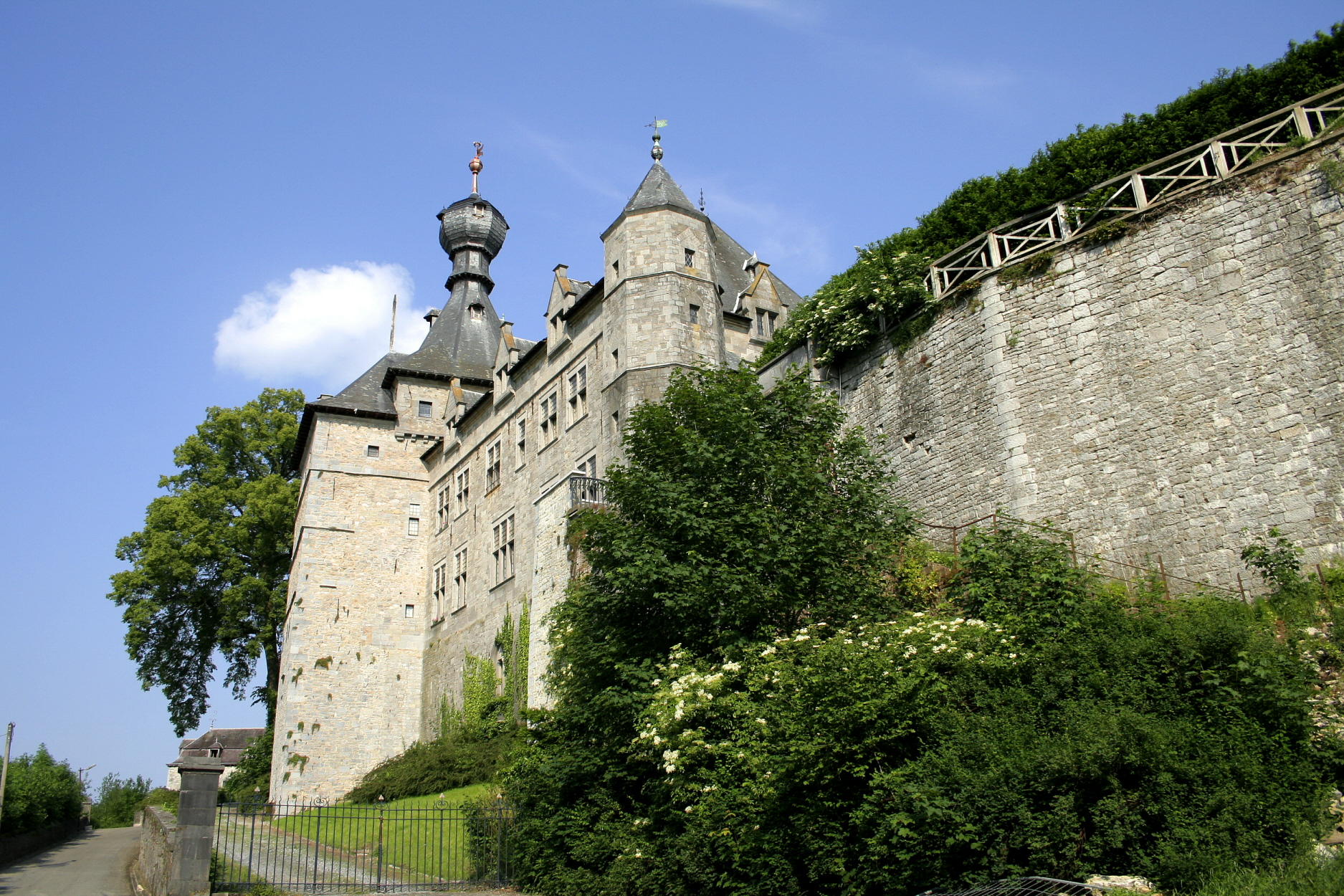
Chimay Castle

Chimay Trappist beers and cheeses are produced in the town by the Chimay Brewery, run by the Trappist monks of Scourmont Abbey, and are internationally renowned.

== Notable people ==
- Daniel van Buyten (b. 1978), football player
- Alfred Cogniaux (1841–1916), botanist
- Émile Coulonvaux (1892–1966), politician
- François Duval (b. 1980), rally car driver
- Jean Froissart (c.1337-c.1405), medieval historian
- Georges Hostelet (1875–1960), mathematician, philosopher, and sociologist
- Thibaut Ramaekers (b. 2009), racing driver
- François-Joseph-Philippe de Riquet (1771–1843), Prince of Chimay, and his wife Thérésa Tallien (1773–1835), French social figure

== Twin cities/towns ==
- Ramsgate, United Kingdom
- Conflans-Sainte-Honorine, France
