= Alexander Henry Stevens =

Banker

- Born: June 16, 1834; New York City, New York, U.S.
- Died: July 10, 1916 (aged 82); Lawrence, New York, U.S.
- Education: Yale College
- Occupation: Banker
- Spouse: Mary Alleyne Otis (m. 1860)
- Parent(s): Byam Kerby Stevens; Frances Gallatin Stevens
- Relatives: Frederic W. Stevens (brother); Byam K. Stevens (brother); Albert Gallatin (grandfather); Ebenezer Stevens (grandfather); John Austin Stevens (uncle); Alexander H. Stevens (uncle)

Alexander Henry Stevens (June 13, 1834 – July 10, 1916) was an American banker.

== Early life ==
Stevens was born on June 13, 1834, in New York City. He was the son of banker Byam Kerby Stevens (1792–1870) and Frances (née Gallatin) Stevens (1803–1877). His father inherited Stevens House, the historic home of his grandfather, Maj. Gen. Ebenezer Stevens. Among his siblings were Among his siblings were Albert Gallatin Stevens, Frances Mary Stevens (wife of Rev. Uriah Tracy), and fellow bankers Frederic W. Stevens and Byam K. Stevens Jr. (who married Elizabeth Langdon Wilks, sister of Matthew Astor Wilks)

His maternal grandfather was Albert Gallatin, the 4th U.S. Secretary of the Treasury who served as the U.S. Ambassador to the United Kingdom and France. His paternal grandparents were Major General Ebenezer Stevens and Lucretia (née Ledyard) Sands Stevens. From his grandmother's first marriage to Richardson Sands (younger brother of Joshua and Comfort Sands), she was the grandmother of fellow banker Samuel Stevens Sands. Among his many prominent relatives was uncle Alexander Hodgdon Stevens, a surgeon, and his first cousins, Lucretia Stevens (née Rhinelander) Jones, the mother of author Edith Wharton.

He was educated at Huddard's School in New York City, entering Yale College in 1850 where he graduated four years later in 1854.

== Career ==
Beginning in January 1855 he served as a cashier's clerk in the Bank of Commerce in New York City, under his uncle, John Austin Stevens, the president of the Bank. After two months of travelling in Cuba, he became a clerk in his brother's store in New York City in May 1856. In early 1857, his elder brother Albert took him into partnership under Stevens, Angelo & Company, and they ran a sugar commission business with Cuba until 1868.

In July of the 1868, he became cashier of the Gallatin National Bank of New York (which was founded by John Jacob Astor and which his grandfather had been the first president). He served as cashier until April 1880 when he became vice-president of the Bank.

In 1890, he was elected president of the Sixth National Bank. When the Sixth National Bank consolidated with the Astor National Bank in 1899, he became vice-president. He served alongside Thomas Cochran as vice-president of the Astor National Bank (later the Astor Trust Company) until his death in 1916.

Stevens also served as president of the Samuel Stevens Realty Company (which had been in the family since its creation by his uncle Samuel Stevens) and was a director of the Mobile and Ohio Railroad and the St. Paul and Duluth Railroad. He was a member of the Sons of the Revolution, founded by his cousin John Austin Stevens.

== Personal life ==
On December 4, 1860, Stevens was married to Mary Alleyne Otis (1833–1918) in Hartford, Connecticut. Mary was the daughter of William Foster Otis and Emily (née Marshall) Otis, and the granddaughter of U.S. Senator Harrison Gray Otis. Mary's sister, Emily Marshall Otis, was married to historian and educator Samuel Eliot. Together, Mary and Alexander were the parents of eight children, including:

- Mary Otis Stevens (1862–1950)
- Frances Gallatin Stevens (1863–1910), who married Capt. Harington Swann of the British Army, a son of John Bellington Swann, in 1893.
- Emily Louise Stevens (b. 1864), who married Frankfurt-born banker Adolph Ladenburg, co-founder of Ladenburg Thalmann and son of Emil Ladenburg, in 1884.
- William Alexander Stevens (1867–1869), who died in infancy.
- Elizabeth Grey Stevens (1869–1893), who died unmarried in Rabodanges, France.
- Eben Stevens (1871–1926), an 1892 Yale graduate who married Evelena Babcock Dixon (1873–1935), daughter of William Palmer Dixon.
- Alexander Eliot Stevens (1873–1883), who died in childhood.
- Francis Kerby Stevens (1877–1945), an 1897 Yale graduate who married Elizabeth Shaw Oliver (1873–1951). He was involved in New York real estate industry and a dairy farm in Gladstone, New Jersey.

On July 10, 1916, Stevens died of heart failure at his home in Lawrence on Long Island, where he had lived since 1874. He was buried in Greenwood Cemetery in Brooklyn.
