= Frederic W. Stevens =

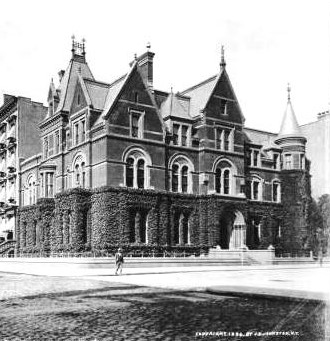
- F.W. Stevens' house (NYC)
- Born: Frederic William Stevens; September 19, 1839; New York City, New York, U.S.
- Died: January 20, 1928 (aged 88); New York City, New York, U.S.
- Education: Yale University; Columbia Law School
- Spouses: Adele Livingston Sampson (m. 1862; div. 1886) Alice Caroline Seely (m. 1904)
- Parent(s): Byam Kerby Stevens; Frances Gallatin Stevens
- Relatives: Byam K. Stevens (brother); Alexander Henry Stevens (brother); Albert Gallatin (grandfather); Ebenezer Stevens (grandfather); John Austin Stevens (uncle); Alexander H. Stevens (uncle)

Frederic William Stevens (September 19, 1839 – January 20, 1928) was an American lawyer and banker.

== Early life ==
Stevens was born on September 19, 1839, in Manhattan. He was a son of Frances (née Gallatin) Stevens (1803–1877) and banker Byam Kerby Stevens (1792–1870), who inherited Stevens House, the historic home of his grandfather. Among his siblings were Byam K. Stevens Jr. and Alexander Henry Stevens, both well-known bankers.

His paternal grandparents were Maj.-Gen. Ebenezer Stevens and Lucretia (née Ledyard) Sands Stevens. Among his many prominent relatives were uncles John Austin Stevens, a banker with his father, and Alexander Hodgdon Stevens, a surgeon. Among his first cousins were John Austin Stevens, founder of the Sons of the Revolution, and Lucretia Stevens (née Rhinelander) Jones, the mother of author Edith Wharton. His maternal grandfather was Albert Gallatin, the 4th U.S. Secretary of the Treasury who served as the U.S. Ambassador to the United Kingdom and France. His uncle was James Gallatin, the second president of the Gallatin National Bank who married Josephine Pascault, a daughter of Louis Pascault, Marquis de Poleon.

After receiving preparatory training Richard P. Jenks, he attended Yale, where he graduated seventh in the class of 1858. While there, he was a member of Psi Upsilon, Skull and Bones, and Phi Beta Kappa.

== Career ==
After graduating from Yale, he spent three years abroad mostly in Berlin, before returning to America to enter Columbia Law School in October 1861. His studies were cut short as the Civil War broke out and he volunteered as a private in the 22nd New York Militia, serving from June to August 1862 during most of which he was stationed at Harper's Ferry. After he was discharged, he spent ten months in Europe before reentering Columbia where he graduated in 1864.

After passing the bar, he practiced law in New York City. He was also actively engaged in the management of his estate and was associated with various banks, including as a director of Chemical National Bank from 1871 until his death in 1928 (of which members of his family had been stockholders for nearly all of its existence); director of Gallatin National Bank (founded by his grandfather) from 1879 until it was taken over by the Hanover National Bank in 1912; director of the Bank for Savings since 1886 (for which he served as First Vice President from 1902 to 1920); director of the New York Gas Light Company from 1871 until it was absorbed into Consolidated Gas Company in 1884; director of the Eagle Fire Insurance Company in 1873; trustee of Bank of New York and Trust Company (formerly New York Life Insurance and Trust Company) from 1872 to 1922 (and then an honorary trustee until his death). At the time of his death, he was the longest serving director of a bank in the United States due to his fifty-seven years as a director of the Chemical National Bank.

Stevens was also a trustee of New York Free Circulating Library and a member of circulating committee of New York Public Library form 1880 to 1908; member of council of University Club from 1879 to 1893 and a member St. James' Episcopal Church in Manhattan.

== Personal life ==
On October 8, 1862, Stevens was married to Adele Livingston Sampson (1841–1912), a daughter of Joseph Sampson and Adele (née Livingston) Sampson. Before their legal separation in 1886, they had a home on Bellevue Avenue in Newport called "the Cedars", were the parents of one son and three daughters, including:

- Adele Livingston "Daisy" Stevens (1864–1939), who married Frederick Hobbes Allen, son of U.S. Representative Elisha Hunt Allen, a former U.S. Minister to the Kingdom of Hawaii.
- Joseph Sampson Stevens (1865–1935), a Rough Rider who married Clara Harriet (née Sherwood) Rollins (1869–1924), the daughter of William Keeler Sherwood and former wife of stockbroker Edward Warren Rollins, in 1899.
- Frederic William Stevens Jr. (1867–1868), who died young.
- Frances Gallatin Stevens (1868–1956), who married Count Charles Alexandre Gaston de Gallifet in 1890. After his death in 1905, she married Count Maurice des Monstiers de Mérinville (1867–1936) in 1914.
- Mabel Ledyard Stevens (1872–1959), who married Count Micislas Orlowski, a polish diplomat and soldier, in 1891.

After their divorce, his wife remarried to the Maurice, Marquis de Talleyrand-Périgord in 1887 (who was recently divorced from Elizabeth Beers-Curtis, another American heiress). They divorced in April 1903, shortly before Stevens married Alice Caroline Seely in New York City on December 8, 1904. Alice was a daughter of Daniel James Seely and Charlotte Louise (née Vail) Seely of Saint John, New Brunswick. They were the parents of one daughter:

- Frederica Stevens (1907–2000), who married John Hone Auerbach (1883–1962) in 1927. After their divorce in 1944, she married French oil executive Philippe Roger Bérard (1893–1977), a grandson of American painter William Parsons Winchester Dana, in 1949.

Stevens died on January 20, 1928, at 925 Park Avenue, his residence in New York City. After a funeral St. James' Church, he was buried in the family vault at Green-Wood Cemetery in Brooklyn. His widow received a life interest in his estate with most of the estate going to his youngest daughter Frederica.
