= Frederic W. Rhinelander =

American museum president (1828–1904)

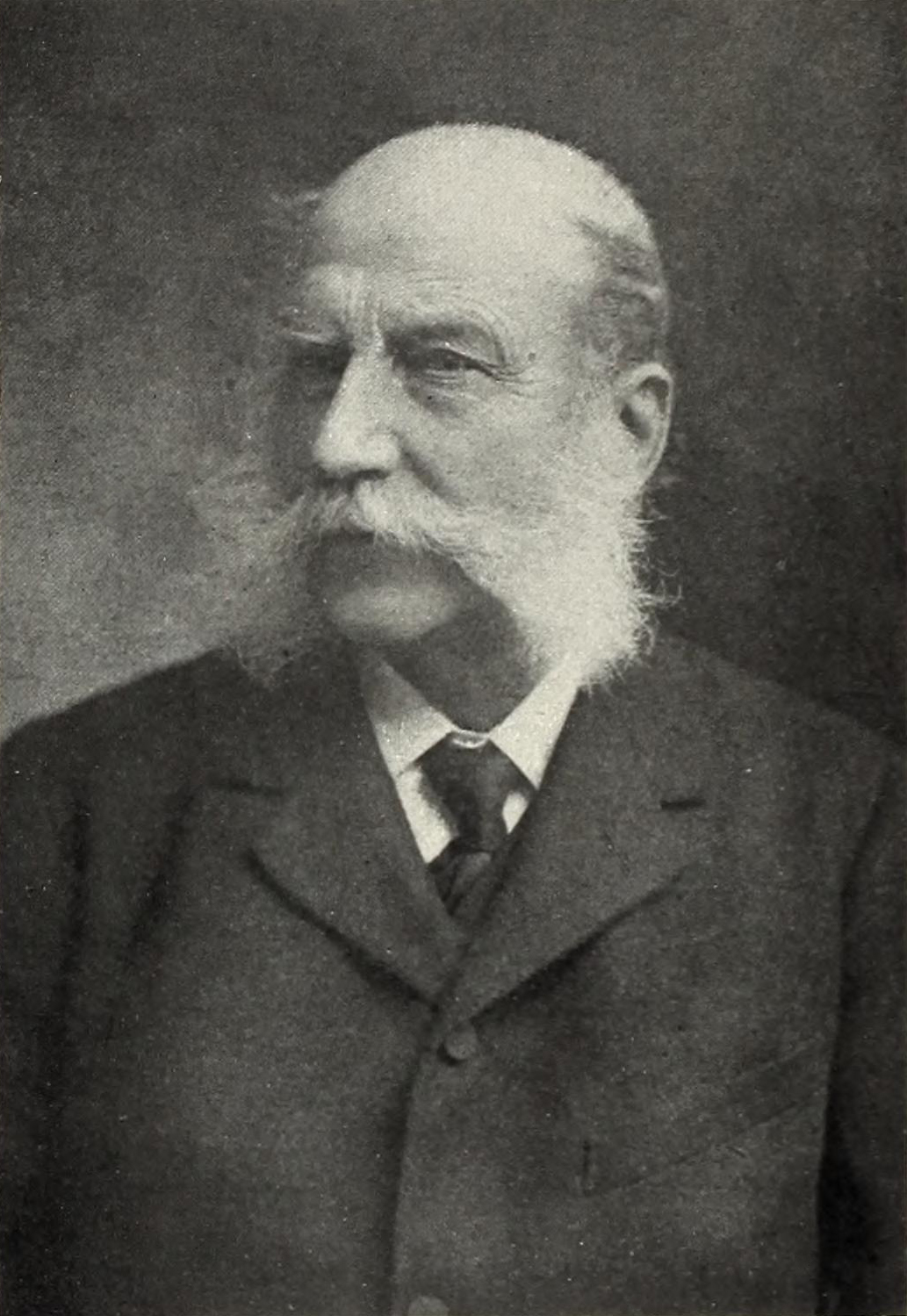

3rd President of the Metropolitan Museum of Art
- In office 1902–1904
- Preceded by: Henry Gurdon Marquand
- Succeeded by: John Pierpont Morgan

Personal details
- Born: Frederic William Rhinelander; February 12, 1828 New York City, U.S.
- Died: September 24, 1904 (aged 76) Stockbridge, Massachusetts, U.S.
- Spouse: Frances Davenport Skinner (m. 1851; died 1899)
- Children: 8, including Philip
- Parent(s): Frederic William Rhinelander; Mary Lucy Ann Stevens Rhinelander
- Relatives: Frederic R. King (grandson); Edith Wharton (niece); Thomas Newbold (nephew); Ebenezer Stevens (grandfather); John Austin Stevens (uncle); Alexander Stevens (uncle); John Austin Stevens (cousin); Samuel Stevens Sands (cousin)
- Education: Columbia University

Frederic William Rhinelander (February 12, 1828 – September 24, 1904) was an American who was prominent in New York society during the Gilded Age and served as president of the Metropolitan Museum of Art.

== Early life ==
Rhinelander was born in New York City on February 12, 1828. He was the only son of four children born to Frederic William Rhinelander (1796–1836) and Mary Lucretia "Lucy Ann" (née Stevens) Rhinelander (1798–1877). Among his sisters was Lucretia Stevens Rhinelander, who married George Frederic Jones (parents of novelist and decorator Edith (née Jones) Wharton and Frederic Rhinelander Jones); Mary Elizabeth Rhinelander, who married Thomas Haines Newbold (parents of New York State Senator Thomas Newbold); and Eliza Lucille Rhinelander, who married William Edgar.

His paternal grandparents were William Rhinelander and Mary (née Robert) Rhinelander, and his uncles included Philip Rhinelander, a member of the U.S. Congress, William Christopher Rhinelander (grandfather of T.J. Oakley Rhinelander and great-grandfather of Anita de Braganza), and New York City Alderman John Robert Rhinelander. His paternal grandmother was the daughter of Col. Robert, an officer under Gen. George Washington during the American Revolutionary War. His mother was the twelfth and last child of Major General Ebenezer Stevens and his second wife, Lucretia (née Ledyard) Sands Stevens. Among his maternal uncles were banker John Austin Stevens (father of John Austin Stevens, founder of the Sons of the Revolution), and surgeon Alexander Hodgdon Stevens. From his grandmother's first marriage, he was a cousin of the banker Samuel Stevens Sands.

Rhinelander's great-great-grandfather, Philip Jacob Rhinelander, was a German-born French Huguenot who immigrated to the United States in 1686 following the revocation of the Edict of Nantes, settling in the newly formed French Huguenot community of New Rochelle, where he amassed considerable property holdings which became the basis for the Rhinelander family's wealth.

Rhinelander graduated from Columbia University in 1847.

== Career ==
In 1876, Rhinelander began serving as president of the Milwaukee, Lake Shore & Western Railroad. Established in 1856, the railroad was taken over by its Eastern bondholders who added Rhinelander and his cousin, Samuel Stevens Sands, to the Board with Rhinelander as president. By 1879, the Railroad owned 188.1 miles of road. By 1889, Rhinelander's son, F. W. Rhinelander Jr., had been installed as assistant to the president and was based in Milwaukee.

=== Metropolitan Museum of Art ===
Rhinelander was a founding trustee of the Metropolitan Museum of Art in 1871 along with Theodore Roosevelt Sr., William Cullen Bryant, Andrew Haswell Green, Alexander Turney Stewart, and John A. Dix. He traveled extensively in Europe seeking to secure "new works of art and to study techniques of organization and preservation at museums and galleries." He was responsible for securing the helmet of Jeanne d'Arc, the Pompeian room, the portrait of the Princess de Condé by Nicolas de Largillière

After the death of Museum president, Henry Gurdon Marquand, in 1902, Rhinelander, who had been vice-president of the Museum since 1892, became the president. He served in this role until his death in 1904. After his death, the banker and philanthropist J. Pierpont Morgan became president of the Met and served until his death in 1913.

== Personal life ==
On November 5, 1851, Rhinelander was married to Frances Davenport Skinner (13 Sep 1828–8 Dec 1899). Frances was a daughter of the Rev. Thomas Harvey Skinner and Frances Louisa (née Davenport) Skinner. The Rhinelanders had a home in New York City and had a French Second Empire style home at 10 Redwood Street in Newport, Rhode Island, built by John Hubbard Sturgis build between 1863 and 1864 (today it is an annex to the Redwood Library located across the street). Together, they were the parents of eight children, including:

- Mary Frederica Rhinelander (1852–1932), who married William Cabell Rives III (1850–1938), a grandson of William Cabell Rives.
- Frances Davenport Rhinelander (b. 1855), who married Rev. William Morgan-Jones of Cardiff, Wales in 1900.
- Ethel Ledyard Rhinelander (1857–1925), who married LeRoy King (1857–1895) in 1881.
- Frederic William Rhinelander (1859–1942), who married Constance Satterlee, daughter of Bishop Henry Y. Satterlee.
- Alice King Rhinelander (1861–1942), who did not marry and lived in Bronxville, New York.
- Helen Lucretia Rhinelander (1864–1898), who married Archdeacon Lewis Cameron (1864–1909) in 1892.
- Thomas Newbold Rhinelander (1865–1928), who married Katherine Blake, daughter of Samuel Hume Blake, in 1894.
- Philip Mercer Rhinelander (1869–1939), the Episcopal Bishop of Pennsylvania who married Helen Maria Hamilton (1870–1956) in, a granddaughter of John Church Hamilton, in 1905.

He was a pall-bearer at the funeral of U.S. Representative John Winthrop Chanler in 1877. He was a member of the Mendelssohn Glee Club, the Knickerbocker Club, the Downtown Club, and the South Side Sportsmen's Club.

His wife died in Washington on December 8, 1899. Rhinelander died at the Red Lion Inn in Stockbridge, Massachusetts on September 24, 1904. His niece Edith Wharton reportedly "mourned his death, wearing black clothes and canceling social engagements." After a funeral at the Belmont Chapel, he was buried at Island Cemetery in Newport, Rhode Island. The pallbearers at his funeral were J. Pierpont Morgan, F. Augustus Schermerhon, Charles F. McKim, Rutherfurd Stuyvesant, John De Witt Warner, James Goodwin, George Gordon King Jr., and Gen. Luigi Palma di Cesnola. At his death, his estate was valued at $10,000,000.

=== Descendants ===
Through his daughter Ethel, he was the grandfather of Frederic Rhinelander King, a prominent architect with the firm of Wyeth and King.

=== Legacy ===
In 1881, the town of Pelican Rapids in Oneida County, Wisconsin was renamed to Rhinelander, Wisconsin after Rhinelander, in an attempt to induce the railroad to extend a spur to the location to further their lumbering business. The Railroad reached the town in 1882.

Cultural offices
Preceded by Henry Gurdon Marquand	President of the Metropolitan Museum of Art; 1902–1904	Succeeded by John Pierpont Morgan
