= Stevens House (Queens) =

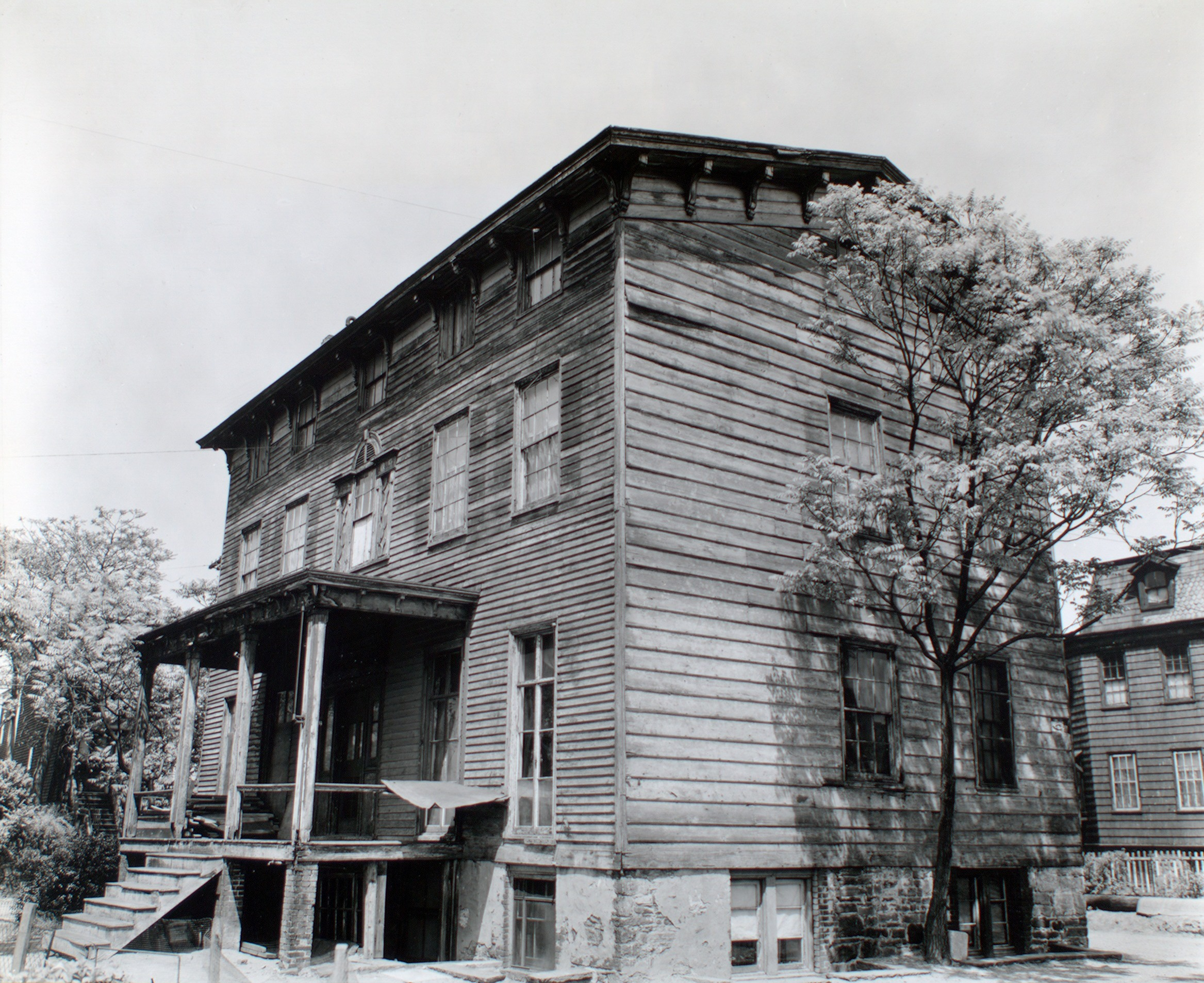
- Stevens House, 1937, by Berenice Abbott

- Location within New York City Stevens House (Queens) (New York)

General information
- Architectural style: Colonial, Federal
- Location: Vernon Boulevard and 30th Road, Astoria, Queens, New York
- Coordinates: 40.7712°N 73.9338°W
- Owner: Ebenezer Stevens

The Stevens House was located on Vernon Boulevard and 30th Road in the Astoria neighborhood of Queens in New York City.

The Stevens House is a large wood-frame house set on a stone foundation featuring a porch supported by brick piers. The original house "stood on the top of a hill, from which there was an extensive view of the East River or Sound, which before the channel was freed from its many obstructions was most picturesque with its ever-changing, whirling, eddying currents."

== History ==
The house was built as a country residence by General Ebenezer Stevens, who named it Mount Napoleon, which was later shortened to "The Mount." Stevens purchased the land from the Hallett family not long after the American Revolutionary War. Stevens was the father of banker John Austin Stevens and surgeon Alexander Hodgdon Stevens, and the grandfather of historian John Austin Stevens (who founded the Sons of the Revolution), and the great-great-grandfather of activist Eugenie Mary Ladenburg Davie.

During the War of 1812, Stevens hosted New York City mayor DeWitt Clinton (the former U.S. Senator from New York and later the 6th Governor of New York) and several other prominent military figures at the house on July 14, 1813, for the inauguration of the military works for the protection against the British located at Hallett's Point (known as Fort Stevens in his honor).

Stevens' son Byam Kerby Stevens (who married the daughter of Albert Gallatin) inherited the house. Gallatin himself died at the home in 1849. The house was later inherited by Stevens' son, Byam Kerby Stevens Jr., a banker who was prominent member of New York society during the Gilded Age.
