= Byam K. Stevens =

American banker (1836-1911)

- Born: Byam Kerby Stevens Jr. January 5, 1836; New York City, New York, U.S.
- Died: December 12, 1911 (aged 75); New York City, New York, U.S.
- Spouse: Elizabeth Langdon Wilks (before 1911)
- Parent(s): Byam Kerby Stevens; Frances Gallatin Stevens
- Relatives: Frederic W. Stevens (brother); Alexander Henry Stevens (brother); Albert Gallatin (grandfather); Ebenezer Stevens (grandfather); John Austin Stevens (uncle); Alexander H. Stevens (uncle)

Byam Kerby Stevens Jr. (January 5, 1836 – December 12, 1911) was an American banker who was prominent member of New York society during the Gilded Age.

== Early life ==
Stevens was born on January 5, 1836, in New York City. He was the son of banker Byam Kerby Stevens (1792–1870) and Frances (née Gallatin) Stevens (1803–1877). His father inherited Stevens House, the historic home of his grandfather, Maj. Gen. Ebenezer Stevens. Among his siblings were brothers and fellow bankers Frederic W. Stevens and Alexander Henry Stevens.

His paternal grandfather was Albert Gallatin, the 4th U.S. Secretary of the Treasury who served as the U.S. Ambassador to the United Kingdom and France. His maternal grandparents were Major General Ebenezer Stevens and Lucretia (née Ledyard) Sands Stevens. From his grandmother's first marriage to Richardson Sands (younger brother of Joshua and Comfort Sands), she was the grandmother of fellow banker Samuel Stevens Sands. Among his many prominent relatives were uncles John Austin Stevens, a banker with his father, and Alexander Hodgdon Stevens, a surgeon. Among his first cousins were John Austin Stevens, founder of the Sons of the Revolution, and Lucretia Stevens (née Rhinelander) Jones, the mother of author Edith Wharton.

== Career ==
Stevens started working in the merchant business importing sugar from Cuba to New York. He later became a member of the Gold Board of New York, formed shortly after the beginning of the American Civil War, the forerunner to the New York Stock Exchange, where he was an active figure holding a seat until his retirement from the exchange in 1883. After 1883, he invested his wealth in real estate, particularly with buildings downtown.

He also served as an editor of Town Topics and the Saturday Evening Post for a time.

=== Society life ===
In 1892, Stevens and his wife (and her brother Matthew Astor Wilks) were both included in Ward McAllister's "Four Hundred", purported to be an index of New York's best families, published in The New York Times. Conveniently, 400 was the number of people that could fit into Mrs. Astor's ballroom.

Stevens was a member of the Metropolitan Club, the Union Club of the City of New York, the Knickerbocker Club and the Metropolitan Club in Washington, D.C.

== Personal life ==
Stevens was married to Elizabeth Langdon Wilks (c. 1843–1930), who went by Eliza. She was the sister of Matthew Astor Wilks and, through her mother, the great-granddaughter of America's first millionaire John Jacob Astor. Among her first cousins were DeLancey Astor Kane, Woodbury Kane, S. Nicholson Kane, and John Jacob Astor IV. Her father, Matthew Wilks, was born in London and was the son of a reverend.

In 1908, Stevens purchased property at 11 East 78th Street, not far from the Stuyvesant Fish mansion at the corner of 78th and Madison Avenue. They built a four-story Italian Renaissance townhouse that was completed in 1909.

Around 1900, they also purchased a villa, known as "Sunnyhome", in Lenox, Massachusetts. The Italianate style residence was originally built c. 1870 and was purchased from Elizabeth Bennett.

Stevens died at his home in New York on December 12, 1911. His funeral was held at Grace Church in Manhattan. His widow died in June 1930, leaving a net estate of $1,606,456, the majority of which was in securities and real estate.
