= George Davie =

George Davie may refer to:

- George Elder Davie (1912–2007), Scottish philosopher
- George Davie (footballer) (1864–?), English footballer
- George M. Davie (1848–1900), American lawyer and poet
