= Fort Stevens =

Fort Stevens may refer to one of three decommissioned American military forts:

- Fort Stevens (Oregon), a fort in Oregon that guarded the mouth of the Columbia River
- Fort Stevens (Washington, D.C.), a fort in Washington, D.C. that defended the city during the Civil War
- Fort Stevens (New York), a fort in New York City built as part of the city's defenses during the war of 1812
