= Eugenie Mary Ladenburg Davie =

American Republican activist

May Davie
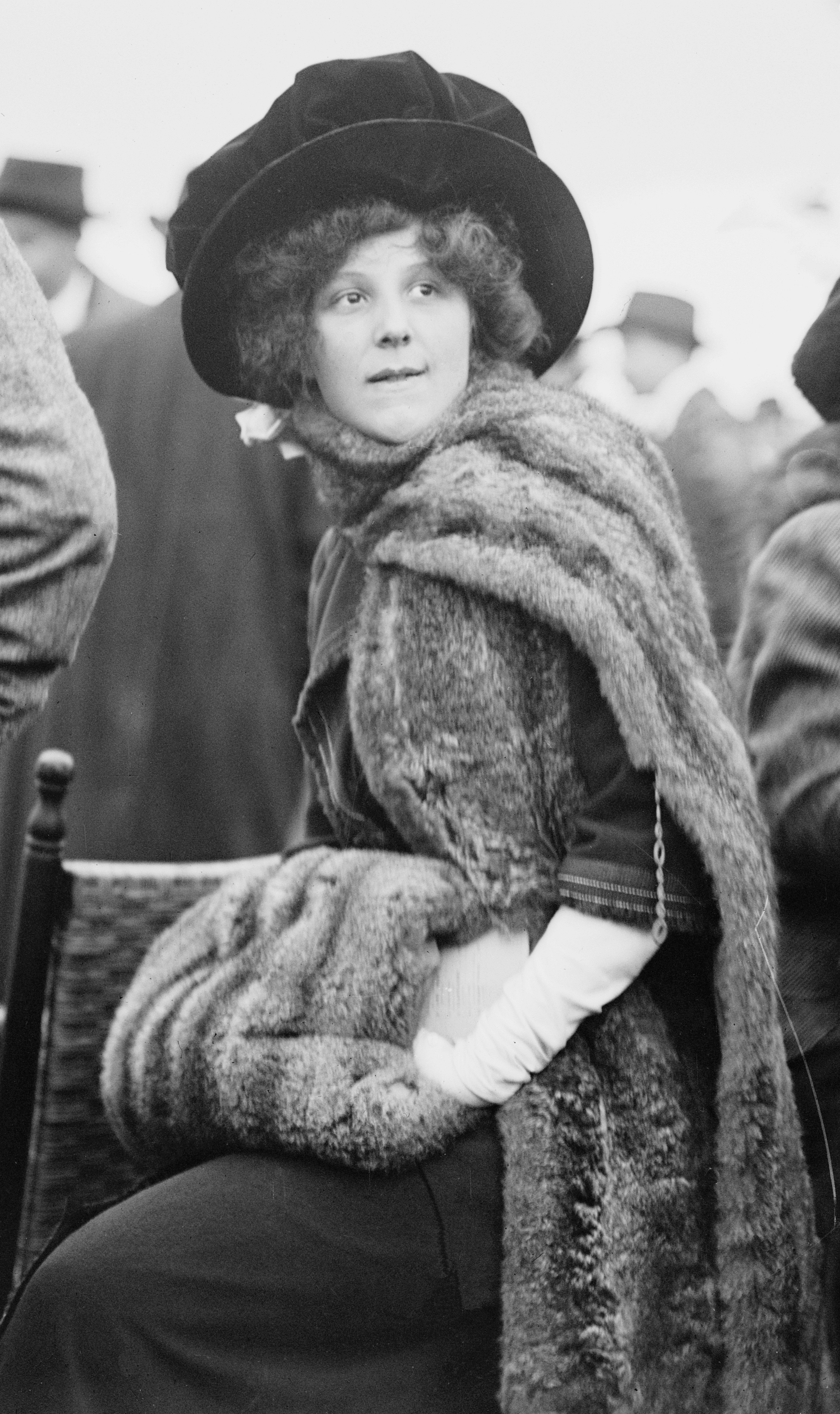
- Eugenie Mary Ladenburg Davie.
- Born: Eugenie Mary Ladenburg; January 31, 1895; New York City, New York, U.S.
- Died: September 19, 1975 (aged 80); New York City, New York, U.S.
- Occupation: Political activist
- Political party: Republican
- Spouse: Preston Davie (died 1967)
- Parent(s): Adolph Ladenburg; Emily Stevens
- Relatives: Emil Ladenburg (grandfather)

Eugenie Mary "May" Ladenburg Davie (January 31, 1895 – September 19, 1975) was a noted Republican activist in New York City and a director of the controversial Pioneer Fund at the end of her life.

== Early life ==
Davie was born in 1895. Davie descended from a Tammany Hall founder. She was the daughter of the former Emily Louise Stevens and Frankfurt-born Adolph Ladenburg, who co-founded Ladenburg Thalmann in 1876 with Ernst Thalmann. Her father died a year after her birth when he was lost overboard from a steamer. Her mother inherited her father's entire estate.

Her mother, the daughter of Alexander Henry Stevens (brother of Byam K. Stevens) and Mary Alleyne (née Otis) Stevens (granddaughter of U.S. Senator Harrison Gray Otis), was from a prominent New York City family descended from Major General Ebenezer Stevens, an officer in the American Revolution, and Albert Gallatin, the 4th U.S. Secretary of the Treasury who served as the U.S. Ambassador to the United Kingdom and France. Her paternal grandparents were Eugénie Adèle (née Halphen) Ladenburg (who was from a respected Parisian family related to the Paris Rothschilds) and Emil Ladenburg, a prominent banker who was born in Mannheim, Grand Duchy of Baden.

== Political activism ==
Davie was a long-time political activist. She once angered pilot Amelia Earhart by injecting political commentary into a speech introduction.

Davie was on the Republican National Finance Committee, a regent of the National Library of Medicine, a trustee at Adelphi College and Long Island University. She was also the chairwoman of the Robert A. Taft Institute of Government.

A onetime leader of the Landon Volunteers, she was vice president of the American Women's Voluntary Services, Inc. She butted heads with Fiorello La Guardia during World War II after he told William Fellowes Morgan, Jr. to dismiss her as an unpaid assistant. She became an active member of the Republican Party and was the head of the Woman’s Auxiliary during Wendell Willkie’s campaign to unseat Franklin D. Roosevelt in 1940. La Guardia's tenure marked the end of the Tammany power in New York, and Davie's political influence gradually faded over the ensuing decades.

Davie made "a handsome gift" to Vanderbilt University in Nashville, Tennessee while Harvie Branscomb was chancellor. When G. Alexander Heard became chancellor in 1963, they "immediately became fast friends" and they attended presidential candidate Barry Goldwater's speech in Madison Square Garden on October 26, 1964. Davie was also a director of the Pioneer Fund.

== Personal life and death ==
Davie was the second wife of lawyer Preston Davie. Her husband died in 1967, but she continued to go by Mrs. Preston Davie in formal situations. She was informally known as May Davie, the name under which her New York Times obituary appeared. Her 1917 affair with Bernard Baruch was of great interest to Alice Roosevelt Longworth who monitored the affair "in the name of patriotism," in the words of historian Blanche Wiesen Cook.

Davie died on September 19, 1975.
