= Emil Ladenburg =

German Banker

- Born: 22 August 1822; Mannheim, Baden
- Died: 8 January 1902 (aged 79); Frankfurt, Hesse-Nassau
- Occupation: Businessman
- Known for: President of E. Ladenburg
- Spouse: Eugénie Adèle Halphen (after 1852)
- Children: 4
- Parent(s): Sara Mayer Ladenburg; Herrmann Ladenburg
- Relatives: Eugenie Mary Ladenburg Davie (granddaughter)

Emil Ladenburg (22 August 1822 – 8 January 1902) was a Privy Councilor, German banker, and co-owner of the Frankfurt-based bank E. Ladenburg which was eventually purchased by Deutsche Bank in 1930.

== Early life ==
Ladenburg was born to a wealthy Jewish family on 22 August 1822 in Mannheim, Grand Duchy of Baden. He was the son of banker Herrmann Ladenburg (1791–1862) and Sara Mayer (1793–1855).

His grandfather, Wolf Ladenburg, had founded W. H. Ladenburg & Söhn in 1789. His uncle, Leopold Ladenburg, and his wife Delphine, were close friends of Johannes Brahms.

== Career ==
In 1838, his brother, Ludwig Ladenburg, established a branch in Frankfurt, Germany. In 1848, after the departure of his brother, Emil assumed control of the Frankfurt bank. The name of the bank was changed to E. Ladenburg after the parent in Mannheim went public. In 1930, E. Ladenburg was purchased by Deutsche Bank.

Landenburg served as a Geheimrat (equivalent to a Privy Councilor).

== Personal life ==
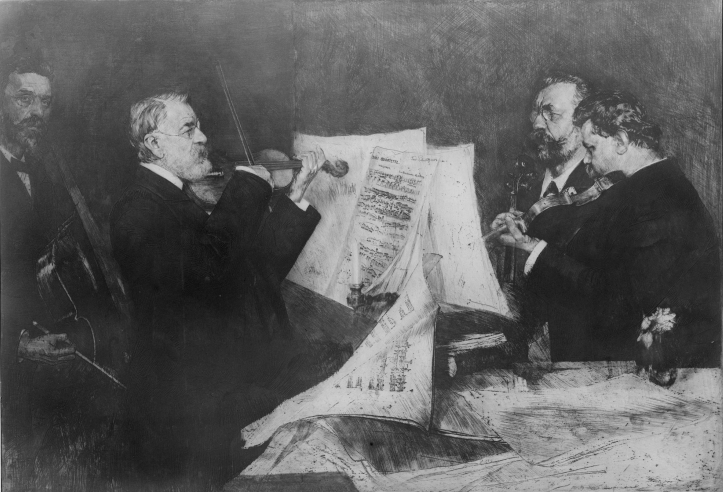
The famous Joachim Quartet. From left to right: Robert Hausmann (cello), Josef Joachim (1st violin), Emanuel Wirth (viola) and Karel Halíř (2nd violin)

On 17 March 1852, Ladenburg married Eugénie Adèle Halphen (1829–1866), the daughter of a respected Parisian family related to the Paris Rothschilds. Together, Eugenie and Emil were the parents of four children, two sons and two daughters:

- Adolph Ladenburg (1855–1896), who co-founded the private American merchant bank Ladenburg Thalmann, with Ernst Thalmann in 1876. He married the American Emily Louise Stevens, daughter of Alexander Henry Stevens and niece of Byam K. Stevens.
- August Ladenburg (1856–1929), who married Gertrud von Hergenhahn (Carl Friedrich August von Hergenhahn). After her death, he married Charlotte Emilie Schmidt (daughter of Gustav Adolf Schmidt).
- Marie Ladenburg (b. 1857), who married the British Engineer Robert Searles Lindley (1854–1925), the son of William Lindley and brother of William Heerlein Lindley.
- Emma Ladenburg (1859–1939), who in 1877 married Dr. Wilhelm Ralph Merton, a founder of the University of Frankfurt and Metallgesellschaft.

Ladenburg died on 8 January 1902 in Frankfurt, then part of Hesse-Nassau. He is buried in the Jewish cemetery in Rat-Beil-Straße.

His strong interest in music made his home a meeting place for respected artists. The violinist and composer Joseph Joachim and the pianist and composer Clara Schumann were amongst the family's closest friends. Ladenburg hosted Johannes Brahms at his home when the "Joachim Quartet" played there in November 1894.
