= Edward Manning Ruttenber =

American historian

Edward Manning Ruttenber, usually published as E. M. Ruttenber (July 17, 1825 in Bennington, Vermont– Dec. 5, 1907) was an American historian who wrote History of the Indian Tribes of Hudson's River and other histories of the Hudson River Valley.

== Works ==
- History of the Indian Tribes of Hudson's River. Albany: J. Munsell, 1872.
- Footprints of the red men. Indian geographical names in the valley of Hudson's river, the valley of the Mohawk, and on the Delaware: their location and the probable meaning of some of them. Newburgh Journal Print, 1906.
