= Charles Grymes McCawley =

United States Marine Corps general

Charles McCawley
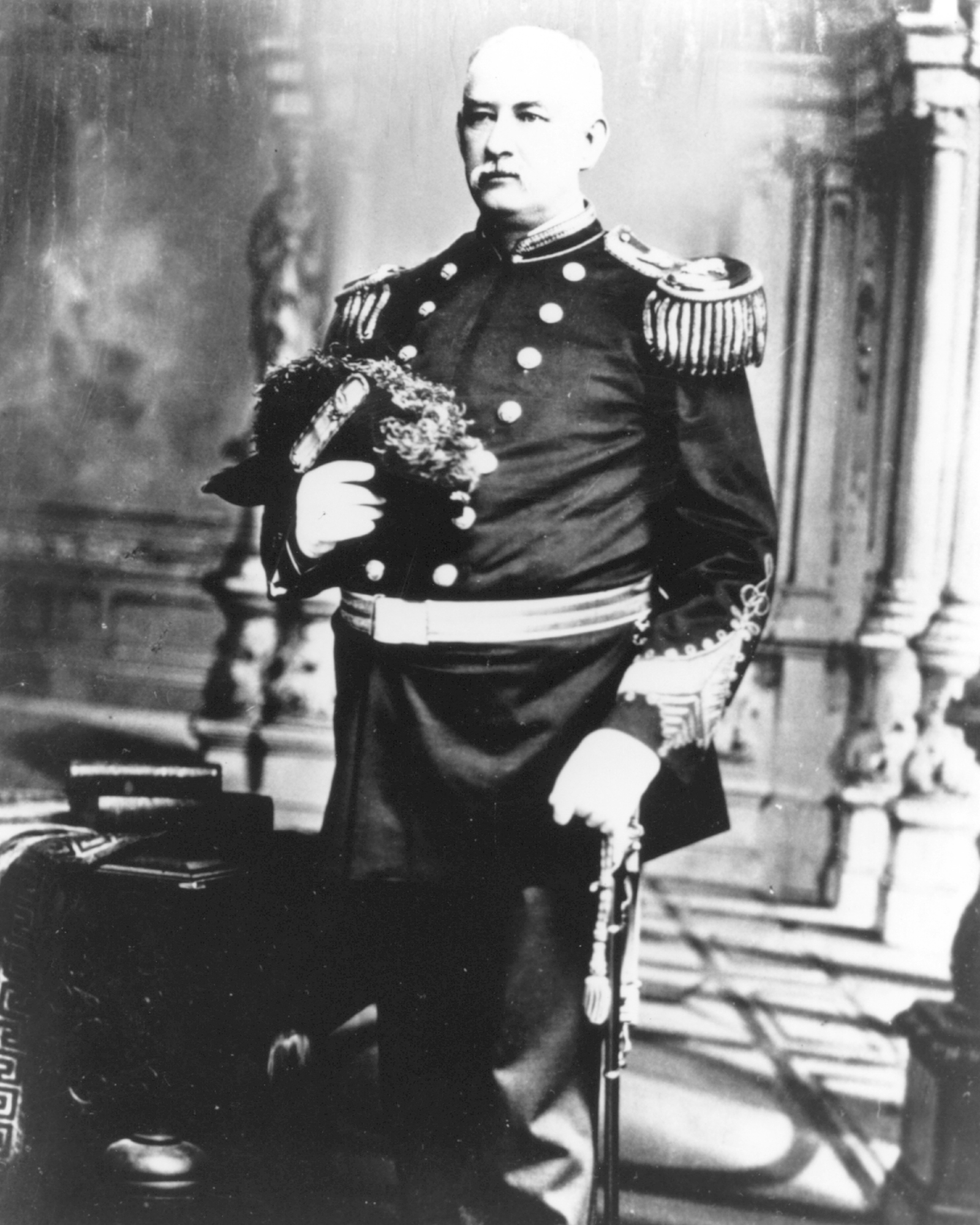
- Born: January 29, 1827; Philadelphia, Pennsylvania, U.S.
- Died: October 13, 1891 (aged 64); Philadelphia, Pennsylvania, U.S.
- Relatives: Charles L. McCawley (son)
- Military career
- Allegiance: United States of America
- Branch: United States Marine Corps
- Service years: 1847–1891
- Rank: Colonel
- Commands: Commandant of the Marine Corps
- Conflicts: Mexican–American War: Battle of Chapultepec; American Civil War: Battle of Fort Wagner

Charles Grymes McCawley (January 29, 1827 – October 13, 1891) was the eighth commandant of the Marine Corps and served as an officer in the United States Marine Corps during the Mexican–American War and the American Civil War.

== Biography ==
Born at Philadelphia, Pennsylvania, McCawley was appointed a second lieutenant in the Marine Corps on March 3, 1847 by President James K. Polk. He took part in the Battle of Chapultepec and the capture of Mexico City during the Mexican–American War. (It is this battle which is commemorated in the Marine Hymn's words, "From the Halls of Montezuma ...")

He was brevetted first lieutenant September 13, 1847, for gallantry in those actions. After the war he commanded the guard of the frigates USS Cumberland and USS Independence in the Mediterranean from 1849 to 1852. He then served at the Philadelphia Navy Yard until 1854. He received promotion to first lieutenant on January 2, 1855 and, after various services afloat and ashore, became captain on July 26, 1861.

In the Civil War, he aided in the capture of Port Royal, South Carolina, November 7, 1861, and led a detachment of 200 marines to reoccupy the Norfolk Navy Yard, May 1862. He subsequently commanded Marine detachments during operations in Charleston Harbor against Forts Wagner, Gregg, and Sumter. For gallant and meritorious conduct during the boat attack on Fort Sumter, September 8, 1863, he was brevetted to the rank of major and received a full promotion to that rank on June 10, 1864.

After the war, he became a First Class Companion of the Military Order of the Loyal Legion of the United States and was promoted to lieutenant colonel on December 5, 1867.

On November 1, 1876, he was appointed colonel commandant, the highest post in the Marine Corps, and served in that position until he retired on January 29, 1891. In 1883, Colonel McCawley chose Semper Fidelis, Latin for 'Always Faithful', as the official Marine Corps motto.

He was a member of the District of Columbia Society of the Sons of the Revolution. In 1890 he became a Veteran Member of the Aztec Club of 1847.

Colonel McCawley died at Philadelphia on October 13, 1891.

== Relations ==
Son of Mary E. (1809–1881) and Marine captain James McCawley (1797–1839). He married his first wife, the former Mary Elizabeth Colegate (1843–1867), on March 28, 1863. The oldest of two sons from this marriage, Charles L. McCawley, also received a commission in the Marine Corps and went on to receive the Marine Corps Brevet Medal and to modify the enlisted Marines sword.

In May 1870 he married his second wife, Elise Alden Henderson, whom he met while commanding the Marine guard at the Boston Navy Yard.

== Namesakes ==
Two ships in the United States Navy have been named USS McCawley in his honor.

Military offices
Preceded by Brig. Gen. Jacob Zeilin	Commandant of the United States Marine Corps; 1876–1891	Succeeded by Maj. Gen. Charles Heywood
