= Preston Davie =

American lawyer and military officer (1881–1967)

- Born: January 31, 1881; Louisville, Kentucky, U.S.
- Died: May 21, 1967 (aged 86); Manhattan, New York, U.S.
- Education: Harvard College; Harvard Law School
- Occupation: Lawyer
- Spouses: Emily H. Bedford (div. 1930) Eugenie Mary Ladenburg (m. 1930)
- Father: George M. Davie
- Relatives: William Preston (grandfather)
- Military career
- Allegiance: United States
- Branch: United States Army
- Rank: Colonel
- Conflicts: World War I
- Awards: Distinguished Service Medal (U.S. Army)

Preston Davie (January 31, 1881 – May 21, 1967) was an American lawyer and colonel during World War I. Davie received a Distinguished Service Medal for his efforts.

== Early life ==
Davie was born in Louisville, Kentucky on January 31, 1881, a son of George M. Davie. He was a grandson of Maj. Gen. William Preston of the Confederate Army who was a member of Congress and U.S. Minister to Spain, and a descendant of William Richardson Davie, the 10th Governor of North Carolina and U.S. Minister to France who was a General in the Continental Army during the American Revolutionary War.

Upon completing military service, he graduated from Harvard College and Harvard Law School.

== Career ==
Davie amassed a large collection of historical documents over the course of his life, pertaining to the early settling of the United States. These include The Preston Davie Collection of Early Americana housed at University of North Carolina.

== Personal life ==
From his first marriage to Emily H. Bedford, which ended in divorce, Davie was the father of a son and daughter, E. T. Bedford Davie and Mrs. Emily Davie Kornfeld.

In 1930, he married his second wife Eugenie Mary "May" Ladenburg (1895–1975), who was a prominent activist in the Republican Party. She assisted in the donation of many of his collections following his death.

Davie died at his home, 71 East 71st Street, in Manhattan, on May 21, 1967.
