= Charles L. McCawley =

United States Marine Corps general

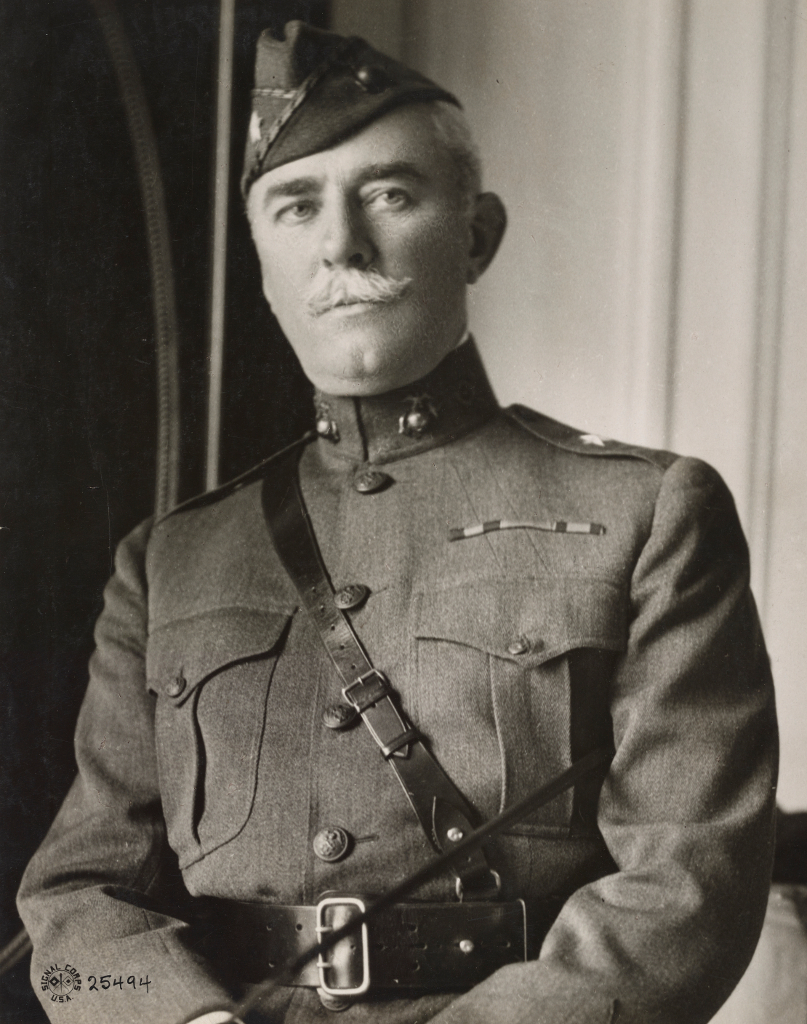
- Brigadier General Charles McCawley, 1919
- Born: August 24, 1865; Massachusetts, U.S.
- Died: April 29, 1935 (aged 69); Washington, D.C., U.S.
- Military career
- Allegiance: United States
- Branch: United States Marine Corps
- Service years: 1881–1929
- Rank: Brigadier general
- Conflicts: Spanish–American War; World War I
- Awards: Marine Corps Brevet Medal; Navy Distinguished Service Medal

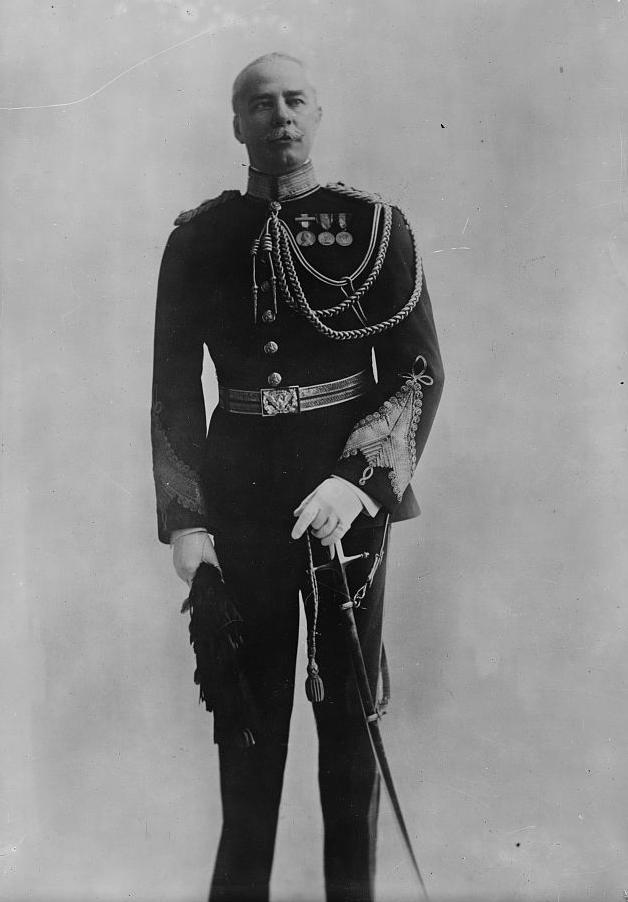
Charles L McCawley

Charles Laurie McCawley (August 24, 1865 – April 29, 1935) was an American officer who served in the United States Marine Corps during the Spanish–American War and World War I. He was one of only 23 Marine Corps officers awarded the Marine Corps Brevet Medal for bravery.

== Early life and marriage ==
McCawley was born August 24, 1865, in Massachusetts to Charles G. McCawley who became the 8th Commandant of the Marine Corps.

He married Sarah Helen Frelinghuysen Davis July 24, 1906, at Washington, D.C.

== Military career ==
McCawley worked in the Commandant of the Marine Corps office as Chief Clerk from 1881 to 1897. His father Colonel Charles Grymes McCawley assumed the duties as the Commandant in 1876, being appointed colonel commandant, the highest post in the Marine Corps, and served in that position until he retired in 1891. The younger McCawley remained on as the Chief Clerk for six years after his father retired, serving under Charles Heywood.

Following his father's death, McCawley became a Hereditary Companion of the Military Order of the Loyal Legion of the United States by right of his father's service in the American Civil War. He was also a member of the District of Columbia Society of the Sons of the Revolution.

In June 1897, Charles L. McCawley was appointed a direct commission in the Marine Corps as a captain.

Captain McCawley was assigned as quartermaster (supply and logistics officer) of the First Marine Battalion on April 19, 1898, at New York Navy Yard in Brooklyn. The First Marine Battalion (Reinforced) was transferred to the North Atlantic Squadron on April 22 and boarded the transport USS Panther for shipment to Key West, Florida. He served as the battalion's quartermaster until September 23, 1898. During that time he participated in battles with the Spanish Army and Cuban irregulars on June 11, 12, and 13 at and near Camp McCalla during operations to capture Guantanamo Bay, Cuba.

He also participated, while on board USS Resolute with his unit, in the bombardment of Manzanillo, Cuba, on August 12 to support the planned invasion of Manzanillo. The invasion was cancelled when a dispatch was received stating that President McKinley had proclaimed an armistice with Spain.

On September 23 McCawley was transferred to Marine Corps Headquarters in Washington, D.C. On March 3, 1899, he was promoted to major and assigned as an assistant quartermaster. On April 1, he was assigned to duty in the Philippines and arrived in Manila on May 23. After brief service in the Philippines, he was ordered on October 4 to inspect the public buildings at Mare Island, California, and Puget Sound, Washington. Upon completion of that duty, he reported to the Commandant of the Marine Corps on November 20, 1899. On March 18, 1900, McCawley received a brevet (honorary promotion) to major for distinguished conduct and public services in the presence of the enemy at Guantanamo Bay on June 11, 1898. As a result of this brevet, McCawley would later be awarded the Marine Corps Brevet Medal.

On July 1, 1900, he reported as ordered to the Philadelphia Navy Yard. On July 25, 1901, he was assigned to temporary duty with the Office of the Quartermaster at Marine Corps Headquarters. He held this assignment until December 31. On November 17, 1902, he was ordered to report to Colonel Theodore A. Bingham, United States Army, Office of Public Buildings and Grounds, Washington, D.C., for duty in connection with social functions of the winter season at the White House, in addition to other duties.

On July 24, 1906, Major McCawley was married to Mrs. Sarah Helen Frelinghuysen Davis at Washington, D.C.

McCawley was appointed Assistant Quartermaster of the Marine Corps on May 23, 1908. The new position came with a promotion to the rank of lieutenant colonel (to rank from May 13, 1908). On July 19, 1910, he assumed charge of the Quartermaster’s Department of the Marine Corps during the absence of Colonel F. L. Denny, Quartermaster, a position he held until Denny's return on April 17, 1913.

On June 24, 1913, Lieutenant Colonel McCawley was appointed as Quartermaster of the Marine Corps, with the rank of colonel (to rank from June 2, 1913). On September 8, 1916, he was appointed as the Quartermaster of the Marine Corps, with the rank of brigadier general (to rank from August 29, 1916).

On September 27, 1918, McCawley accompanied Major General Commandant George Barnett to France on a tour of inspection before resuming his duties on December 16, 1918, as The Quartermaster of the Marine Corps.

On November 11, 1920, Brigadier General McCawley was awarded the Navy Distinguished Service Medal by President Woodrow Wilson.

He retired from the Marine Corps August 24, 1929, having reached the mandatory retirement age of 64.

He died April 29, 1935, at his home in Washington, D.C., and was buried at Arlington National Cemetery May 1, 1935. His grave can be found in the south section, site 3888. His wife Sarah was buried beside him when she died.

== Awards ==
=== Presidential citation ===
Citation:

The President of the United States takes pleasure in presenting the Marine Corps Brevet Medal to Charles Laurie McCawley, Captain, U.S. Marine Corps, for distinguished conduct and public service in the presence of the enemy at Guantanamo, Cuba, 11 June 1898. On 18 March 1901, appointed Major by brevet.

=== Secretary of the Navy citation ===
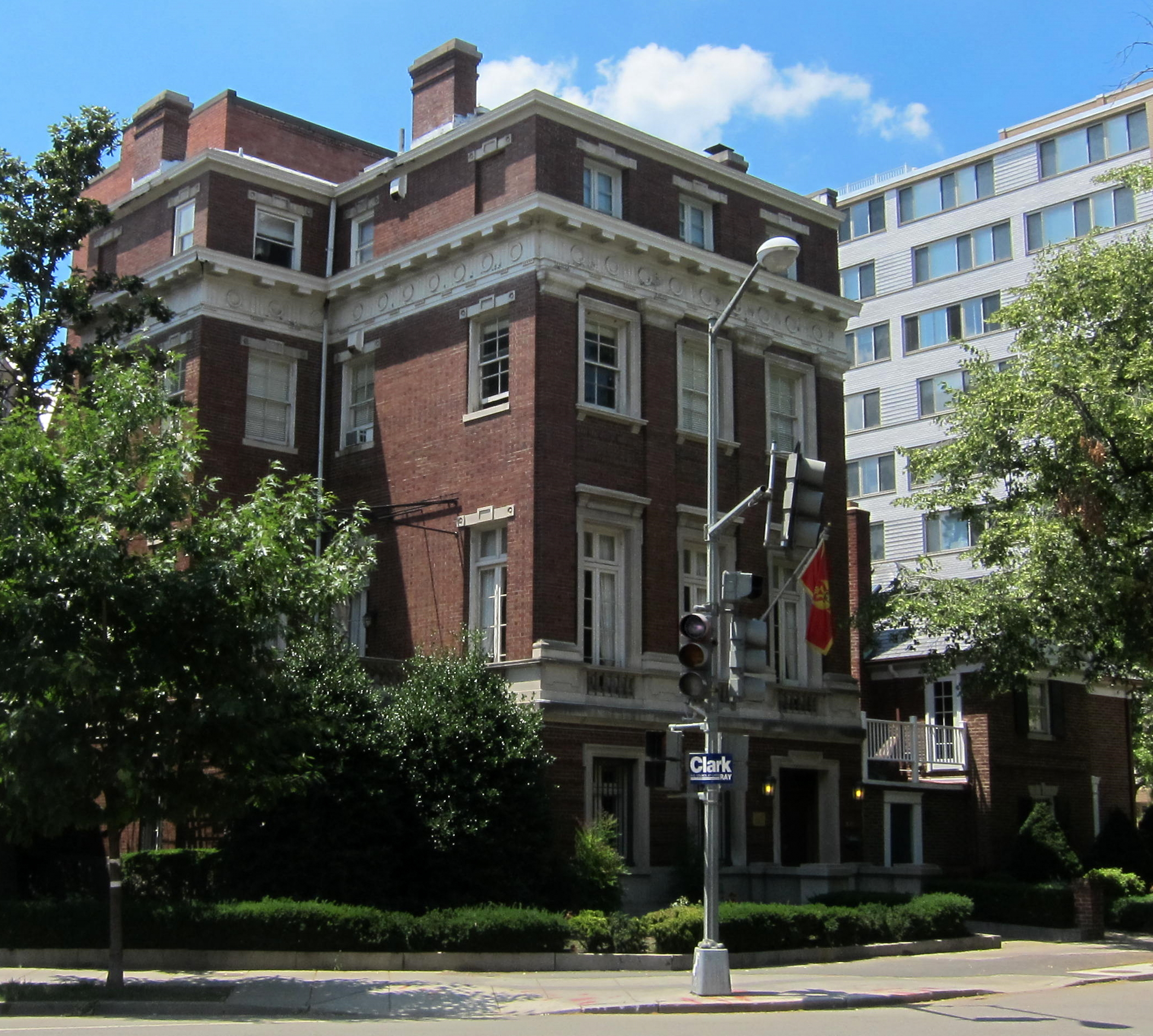
McCawley's former residence in Washington, D.C.

Citation

The Secretary of the Navy takes pleasure in transmitting to Captain Charles Laurie McCawley, United States Marine Corps, the Brevet Medal which is awarded in accordance with Marine Corps Order No. 26 (1921), for distinguished conduct and public service in the presence of the enemy while serving as Quartermaster, First Marine (Huntington's) Battalion, at Guantanamo, Cuba, on 11 June 1898. On 18 March 1901, Captain McCawley is appointed Major, by brevet, to take rank from 11 June 1898.

=== Navy Distinguished Service Medal ===
Citation:

The President of the United States of America takes pleasure in presenting the Navy Distinguished Service Medal to Brigadier General Charles Laurie McCawley, United States Marine Corps, for exceptionally meritorious service in a duty of great responsibility in the organization and administration of the Quartermaster's Department of the Marine Corps during World War I. Through his energy and efficient management this Department was able successfully to meet the various emergencies and difficulties connected with the transportation, subsistence, housing and clothing of the personnel of the Marine Corps throughout the period of the war.

=== Medals ===
- Marine Corps Brevet Medal
- Navy Distinguished Service Medal
- Sampson Medal
- Spanish Campaign Medal
- Philippine Campaign Medal
- World War I Victory Medal

== See also ==
Biography at Spanish–American War Centennial Website
