= George M. Davie =

American lawyer and poet (1848–1900)

George Montgomery Davie
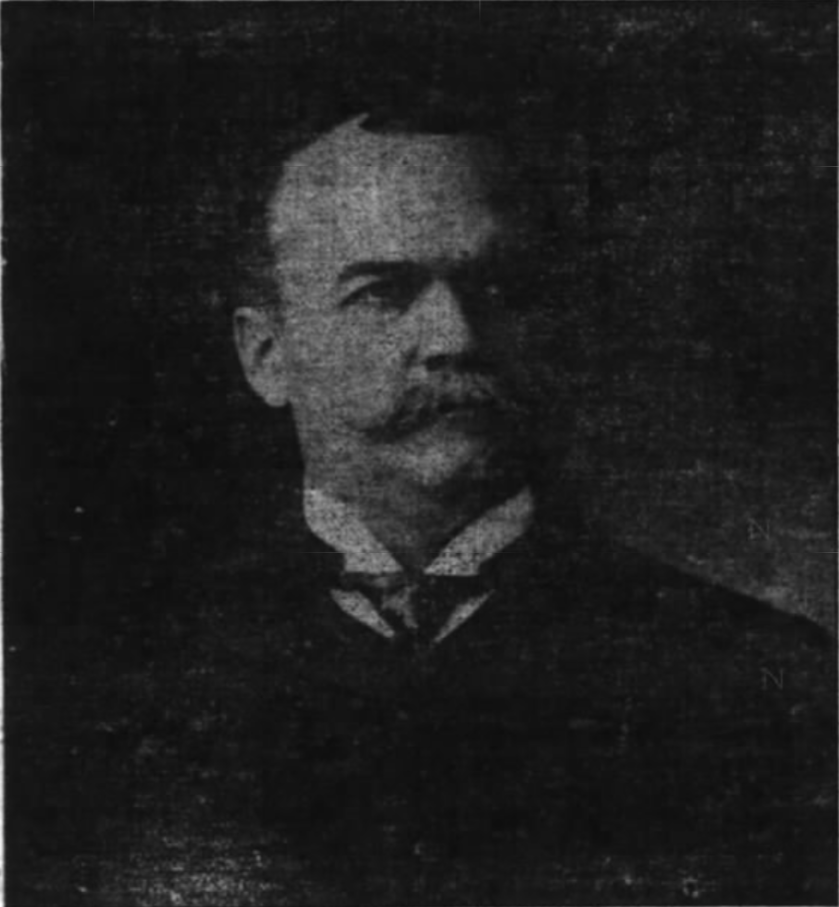
- Davie in a 1900 newspaper
- Born: March 16, 1848; Christian County, Kentucky, U.S.
- Died: February 22, 1900 (aged 51); New York City, New York, U.S.
- Resting place: Cave Hill Cemetery; Louisville, Kentucky, U.S.
- Education: Centre College
- Alma mater: Princeton University; University of Louisville School of Law
- Occupations: Lawyer; poet
- Political party: Democratic
- Spouse: Margaret Preston (m. 1878)
- Children: Preston Davie

George Montgomery Davie (March 16, 1848 – February 22, 1900) was an American lawyer and poet from Louisville, Kentucky. He is regarded as the founder of Louisville's system of parks.

== Early life ==
George Montgomery Davie was born on March 16, 1848, in Christian County, Kentucky to Sarah A. (née Phillips) and Winston J. Davie. His father was a wealthy planter, originally from North Carolina. He attended school in the country and lived on his father's farm. Davie studied at the Centre College in Louisville, Kentucky. He graduated from Princeton University in 1868 and studied law at the University of Louisville School of Law. He worked in the law offices of Robert W. Woolley and was admitted to the bar in 1870.

== Career ==
In 1874, he entered as a junior partner to Muir & Bijur. The partnership dissolved and it became Bijur & Davie in 1877. In 1885, Davie went into a law partnership with John Mason Brown. Alexander Pope Humphrey joined the law firm and Brown died in 1890. Davie remained with the firm Humphrey & Davie until his death.

Davie served as the counsel for the Board of Trade and Park Commission of Louisville. Brown and Davie helped organize Louisville's system of parks and The New York Times called Davie the "founder of Louisville's system of parks" upon his death.

He wrote a poem titled "A Yearn for the Romantic" that was printed in magazines across the United States. He was a noted poet and his translation of the Odes (Horace) was lauded. He was one of the founding members of The Filson Historical Society.

Davie was a Democrat, though he opposed free silver. He was friends with Generals John M. Palmer and Simon Bolivar Buckner, candidates in the 1896 United States presidential election. He served as the chairman of the Palmer and Buckner National Democratic Committee in Kentucky.

== Personal life ==
Davie married Margaret Howard Preston, daughter of General William Preston, on December 5, 1878. They had one son, Preston Davie. His wife's sister, Mary Owen Preston, married his law partner John Mason Brown.

Davie died on February 22, 1900, of a sarcoma at the Park Avenue Hotel in New York City. He was buried at Cave Hill Cemetery in Louisville.
