= Samuel Stevens Sands =

American banker, head of S.S. Sands & Co. (1827–1892)

- Born: November 18, 1827; New York City, US
- Died: July 24, 1892 (aged 64); New Hamburg, New York, US
- Education: University of the City of New York
- Occupation: President of S.S. Sands & Co.
- Spouses: Eliza Dickson Aymar (m. 1849; died 1850) Mary Ellis Aymar (m. 1852; died 1879)
- Children: 11, including Charles and Benjamin
- Relatives: John Austin Stevens (uncle); Alexander Hodgdon Stevens (uncle)

Samuel Stevens Sands (November 18, 1827 – July 24, 1892) was an American banker who served as the head of S.S. Sands & Co.

== Early life ==
Sands was born at 112 Chambers Street in New York City on November 18, 1827. He was a son of Austin Ledyard Sands, a merchant in New York City, and Anne Maria (née Hodge) Sands. Among his siblings was brother Austin Ledyard Sands Jr.

His paternal grandparents were Richardson Sands and Lucretia (née Ledyard) Sands. After his grandfather's death, his grandmother married Ebenezer Stevens (1751–1823), a Lieutenant Colonel in the Continental Army during the American Revolution, a Major General in the New York State Militia, and a merchant. She then became the mother of banker John Austin Stevens and surgeon Alexander Hodgdon Stevens.

He was a graduate of the University of the City of New York with the Class of 1846.

== Career ==
In 1854, he became a member of the New York Stock Exchange. Sands was a banker and broker in partnership with William Henry Reese. He acted as broker for a number of important financial interests, including the Astor family. For many years, Sands was the president of S.S. Sands & Co. He had several partners throughout his career, including his brother, William Richardson Sands, his brother-in-law, Edmund Brandt Aymar, William Henry Reese, and his sons Samuel Jr. and Charles.

Towards the end of his career, he became involved in the railroad business, financing Boston and New York Air-Line Railroad, the Indianapolis, Decatur & Springfield Railway, the Milwaukee Railroad, the Lakeshore and Western Railway and the Colorado Midland Railway.

=== Country home ===
In 1865, Sands built "Elmhurst" at New Hamburg, New York, a small hamlet along the Hudson River in Dutchess County, New York.

== Personal life ==
On June 14, 1849, Sands was married to Eliza Dickson Aymar, a daughter of Benjamin Aymar, also a merchant, and Elizabeth (née Van Buren) Aymar. After her death in 1850, he married her sister, Mary Ellis Aymar on April 15, 1852. Their elder sister was married to John D. Van Buren Jr., the New York State Engineer and Surveyor. After his marriage he lived at 80 Fifth Avenue in New York City and, later, at 385 Fifth Avenue. Together, they were the parents of:

- Benjamin Aymar Sands (1853–1917), who married Amy Kirby Akin, the daughter of William H. Akin.
- Ledyard Sands (1854–1897), who married Sarah F. Thornton and died in Sri Lanka.
- Samuel Stevens Sands Jr. (1856–1889), who married Anne Harriman (1861–1940), the daughter of banker Oliver Harriman and Laura (née Low) Harriman. He died from a fall during a hunt at Meadow Brook Golf Club in 1889. After his death, his widow remarried first to Lewis Morris Rutherfurd Jr., and after his death, William Kissam Vanderbilt in 1903.
- Eliza Louise Sands (1858–1934), who was involved in the Social Service Committee of the Volunteer Hospital and did not marry.
- Mary Emily Sands (1859–1863), who died young.
- William Henry Sands (1861–1920), who married Frances Augusta Lorillard (August 8, 1864 – January 30, 1931), daughter of Jacob Lorillard and granddaughter of Pierre Lorillard III.
- Anna Sands (1864–1932), a social leader in New York City and Newport, Rhode Island, who did not marry.
- Charles Edward Sands (1865–1945), an Olympic tennis player who married Sarah Wilson Simonton in 1920.
- Robert Cornell Sands (1867–1932), who did not marry.
- Harold Cater Sands (1869–1881), who also died young.
- Katharine Aymar Sands (1871–1951), who married Theodore Augustus Havemeyer Jr. (1868–1936), son of Theodore Havemeyer, in 1893.

He died on July 26, 1892, at his country home, "Elmhurst", near New Hamburg, New York. Sands was buried at Greenwood Cemetery, in Brooklyn.

=== Descendants ===
Through his son Samuel Jr., he was a grandfather of Samuel Stevens Sands III, who married Gertrude Sheldon, daughter of George R. Sheldon, in 1910, and George Winthrop Sands, who was married to Tayo Newton, daughter of Dr. B. Newton of New York, in 1905.
