= Ebenezer Stevens =

US Army officer (1751–1823)

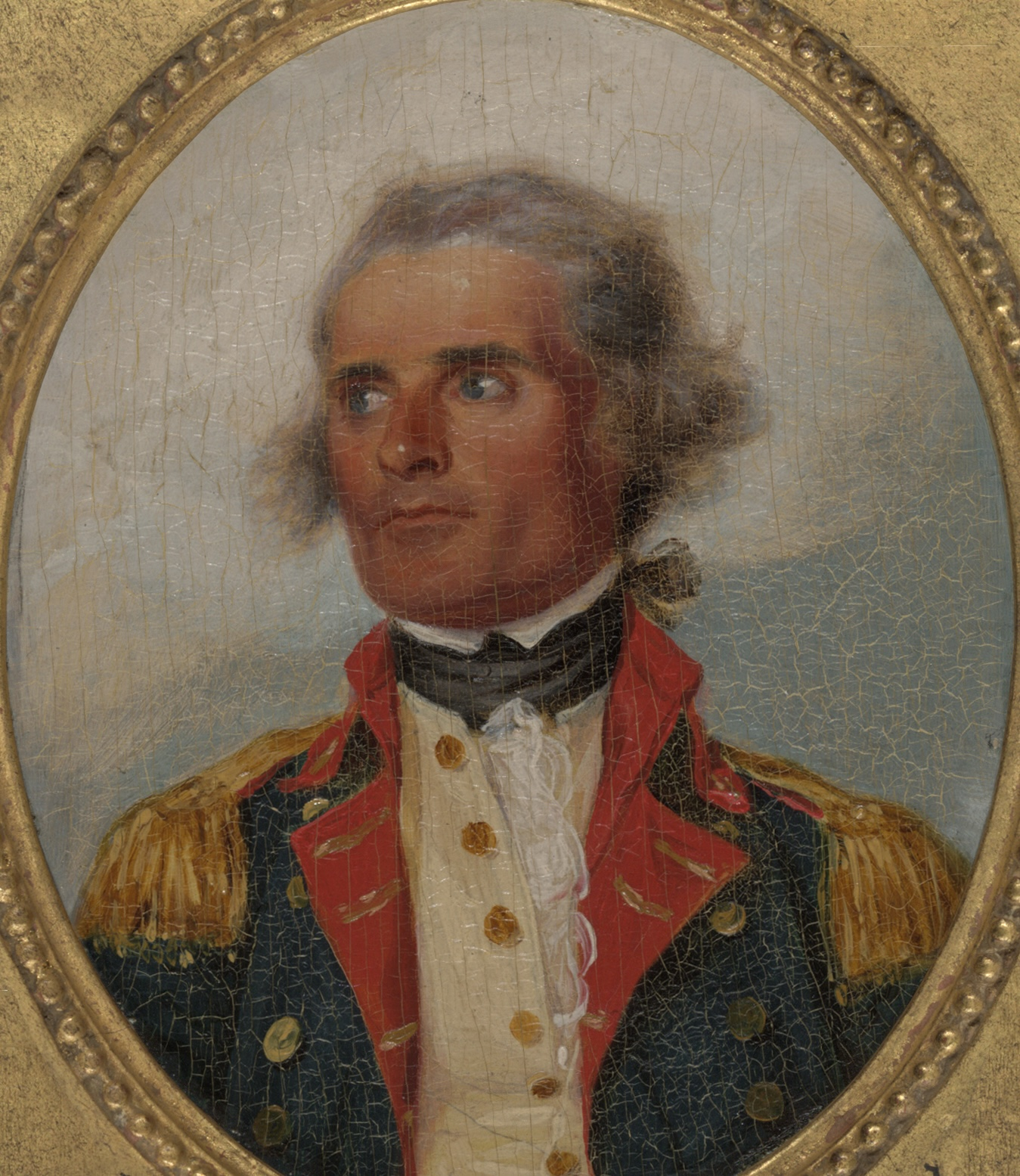
- Portrait miniature by John Trumbull, c. 1791
- Born: August 11, 1751; Roxbury, Province of Massachusetts Bay, British America
- Died: September 2, 1823 (aged 72); Rockaway, New York, United States
- Occupations: General, merchant
- Spouses: Rebecca Hodgden (m. 1774, died) Lucretia Ledyard Sands (m. 1784)
- Children: 11, including Alexander, John
- Relatives: Byam K. Stevens (grandson); John A. Stevens Jr. (grandson); Edith Wharton (great granddaughter)

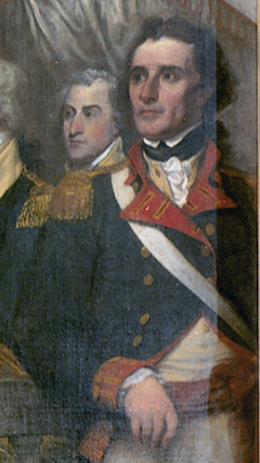
Detail from Surrender of General Burgoyne (1821) depicting Stevens

Ebenezer Stevens (August 11, 1751 – September 2, 1823) was a lieutenant colonel in the Continental Army during the American Revolution, a major general in the New York state militia, and a New York City merchant.

== Early life ==
Stevens was born on August 11, 1751, in Roxbury in what was then the Province of Massachusetts Bay in British America. He was the son of Ebenezer Stevens (1726–1763) and Elizabeth (née Weld) Stevens (b. 1727), and his paternal grandfather was Erasmus Stevens, a native of Boston, a lieutenant with the Military Company of the Massachusetts.

== Career ==
Ebenezer Stevens was a participant in what became known as the Boston Tea Party. A member of the Sons of Liberty, he began his career in Paddock's Artillery Company along with the likes of Paul Revere and Thomas Crafts. Together with other members of the company, and under the leadership of Jabez Hatch, he participated in the Boston Tea Party. His later recollections to his family debunked the myth that the participants had dressed up as Native Americans.

=== Revolutionary War service ===
Not long after the Boston Tea Party he moved to Rhode Island and there, upon receiving news of the Battle of Lexington, volunteered for the Continental Army. He was commissioned as a first lieutenant in the Company of Rhode Island Artillery in May 1775, and fought in the Battle of Bunker Hill under Major General Nathanael Greene. He was promoted to major of the Independent Battalion of Artillery on November 9, 1776.

Ebenezer was selected by George Washington to raise battalions against Quebec, Canada. Ebenezer was present at the surrender of the British General Burgoyne at Saratoga, New York, on October 17, 1777. He served under the French general the Marquis de Lafayette in Virginia with distinction.

On November 24, 1778, he was promoted to the rank of lieutenant colonel in Lamb's Continental Artillery Regiment (later the 2nd Continental Artillery Regiment) to rank from April 30, 1778. In 1781 he was one of the artillery commanders at the Siege of Yorktown. He was discharged from the army in June 1783.

=== After the war ===
Although it is stated in several sources that Stevens was a major general in the United States Army, there is no official documentation to support this notion. He was, however, a major general in the New York state militia after the Revolution and mobilized militiamen to defend New York City in case of British attack in September 1814. He was the initial commander of Fort Stevens, which was named after him, which was built to protect Hell Gate from a potential British invasion.

He lived as a merchant in New York City. In 1795 Stevens and Peter Schermerhorn purchased a water lot from William Beekman. Three years later, four buildings at 220-226 Front Street were built on the portion that had been filled in. Stevens, a fleet owner and liquor importer, operated out of 222 Front Street.

== Personal life ==
Stevens was married twice. He married his first wife, Rebecca Hodgden (sometimes spelled Hodgdon), in Providence, Rhode Island, on October 11, 1774. Rebecca was the daughter of Benjamin Hodgdon. Together, Ebenezer and Rebecca were the parents of:

- Elizabeth Stevens (1775–1777), who died young.
- Horatio Gates Stevens (1778–1873), who married Eliza Lucille Rhinelander (1789–1873), a daughter of William Rhinelander. He was also a major general in the New York state militia.
- Rebecca Hodgden Stevens (1780–1815), who married John Peter Schermerhorn, a brother of Abraham Schermerhorn (both sons of Peter Schermerhorn).
- George Alexander Stevens (1782–1807), who died unmarried, lost at sea.

After the death of his first wife in July 1783, he married secondly to Lucretia (née Ledyard) Sands (1756–1846) on May 4, 1784, in New York City. Lucretia was the widow of Richardson Sands (younger brother of Joshua and Comfort Sands). From her first marriage, Lucretia was the grandmother of banker Samuel Stevens Sands. Together, they were the parents of:

- Samuel Stevens (1785–1844), a prominent lawyer and commissioner of the Croton Aqueduct.
- William Stevens (1787–1867).
- Alexander Hodgdon Stevens (1789–1869), a surgeon who married three times; Mary Jane Bayard (1792–1823), Catherine Morris (1801–1838) (granddaughter of Lewis Morris) in 1825, Phoebe Coles Lloyd (1818–1907).
- Byam Kerby Stevens (1792–1870), who married Frances Gallatin (1803–1877), the daughter of Albert Gallatin, the 4th U.S. Secretary of the Treasury who served as the U.S. Ambassador to the United Kingdom and France.
- John Austin Stevens (1795–1874), a banker who married Abigail Perkins Weld (1799–1886). Abby was a first cousin of Ebenezer.
- Henry Hewgill Stevens (1797–1869), who married Catherine Clarkson Crosby (1812–1882), sister of Clarkson F. Crosby, in 1836.
- Mary Lucretia Stevens (1798–1877), who married Frederic William Rhinelander (1778–1836).

Stevens died on September 2, 1823, in Rockaway, New York. He was buried at Green-Wood Cemetery in Brooklyn.

=== Descendants ===
Through his oldest son Horatio, he was the grandfather of Mary Lucille Stevens (1817–1892), who married Albert Rolaz Gallatin (1800–1890), a son of Albert Gallatin, in 1837. Albert Rolaz Gallatin was the older brother of Frances Gallatin, the wife of Ebenezer's son Byam (Mary's half-uncle).

Through his son Byam, he was the grandfather of New York bankers Byam Kerby Stevens Jr. (1836–1911) and Alexander Henry Stevens (1834–1916), himself the grandfather of Eugenie Mary (née Ladenburg) Davie, a Republican activist who served as a director of the Pioneer Fund.

Through his son John, he was the grandfather of historian John Austin Stevens who founded the Sons of the Revolution.

Through his daughter Mary Lucretia, Stevens was the grandfather of Frederic W. Rhinelander, president of the Metropolitan Museum of Art, and Lucretia Stevens (née Rhinelander) Jones (1824–1901), mother to novelist and decorator Edith Wharton (née Edith Newbold Jones) and Frederic Rhinelander Jones.
