= Fort Stevens (New York) =

- Part of Fortifications of NYC during the War of 1812
- Hell Gate, New York City in United States
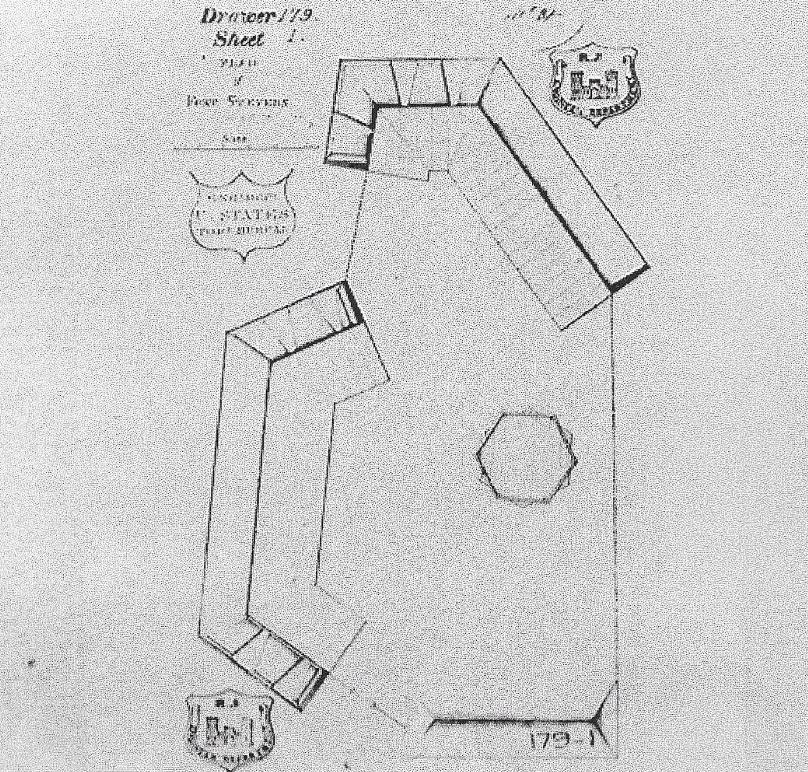
- US Army Corps of Engineers outline of Fort Stevens from 1814

Site information
- Type: Artillery battery

Location
- Coordinates: 40°46′40″N 73°56′5″W

Site history
- Built: 1814
- Built for: War of 1812
- In use: Until 1815; 211 years ago
- Fate: Abandoned
- Demolished: 1982 (last building)

Garrison information
- Past commanders: Ebenezer Stevens

Fort Stevens was a fort on Hallett's Point, Queens, along the East River, constructed in 1814. The fort included a blockhouse on Mill Rock in the River at Hell Gate. Plans from February 1776 showed earlier forts on both sides of the East River including opposite Fort Stevens at Horn's Hook Battery.

== History ==
Prior to the construction of the fort the location was used by the British during the American Revolution as a battery to bombard New York City after the battle of Long Island. The fort itself was named after Ebenezer Stevens, its only commander. Stevens, a revolutionary general in service to George Washington came out of retirement during the War of 1812 with the fort being built during the war to protect the east river from a prospective British invasion. The fort's cornerstone was laid by then mayor De Witt Clinton and the fort was designed to be temporary and consisted of 12 guns.

Unlike other temporary forts from the time which were made of timber Fort Stevens was made of stone, however, due to the fort's low lying location right on the water of the East River, its practical defense capabilities were low as the fort was designed to thwart one-off raiders. Behind the fort, on the hill overlooking it, was another defensive structure, Castle Bogardus or "Halletts Point Tower", which would've protected the fort from a ground assault.

The fort would be decommissioned after the war in 1815 when the British threat passed. By 1836 Hallett’s Cove Village a small settlement of about 20 to 30 dwellings was built around the abandoned fort including an Episcopalian church. This village would eventually develop into the Astoria neighborhood of Queens.

Part of the fort remained in operation as a light house complete with a lighthouse keeper's residence until 1982 when the last building of the fort had been demolished. Today the site of the fort is home to Whitey Ford Field, a park managed by the NYC Department of Parks and Recreation named after Whitey Ford. A navigational beacon continues to guide ships at the edge of the field.

The former site of the fort, and the current baseball field, is the subject to redevelopment debates, with a 2,400 unit apartment complex being built adjacent to the site, and plans for a ferry service and major refurbishment at the field.

== Gallery ==
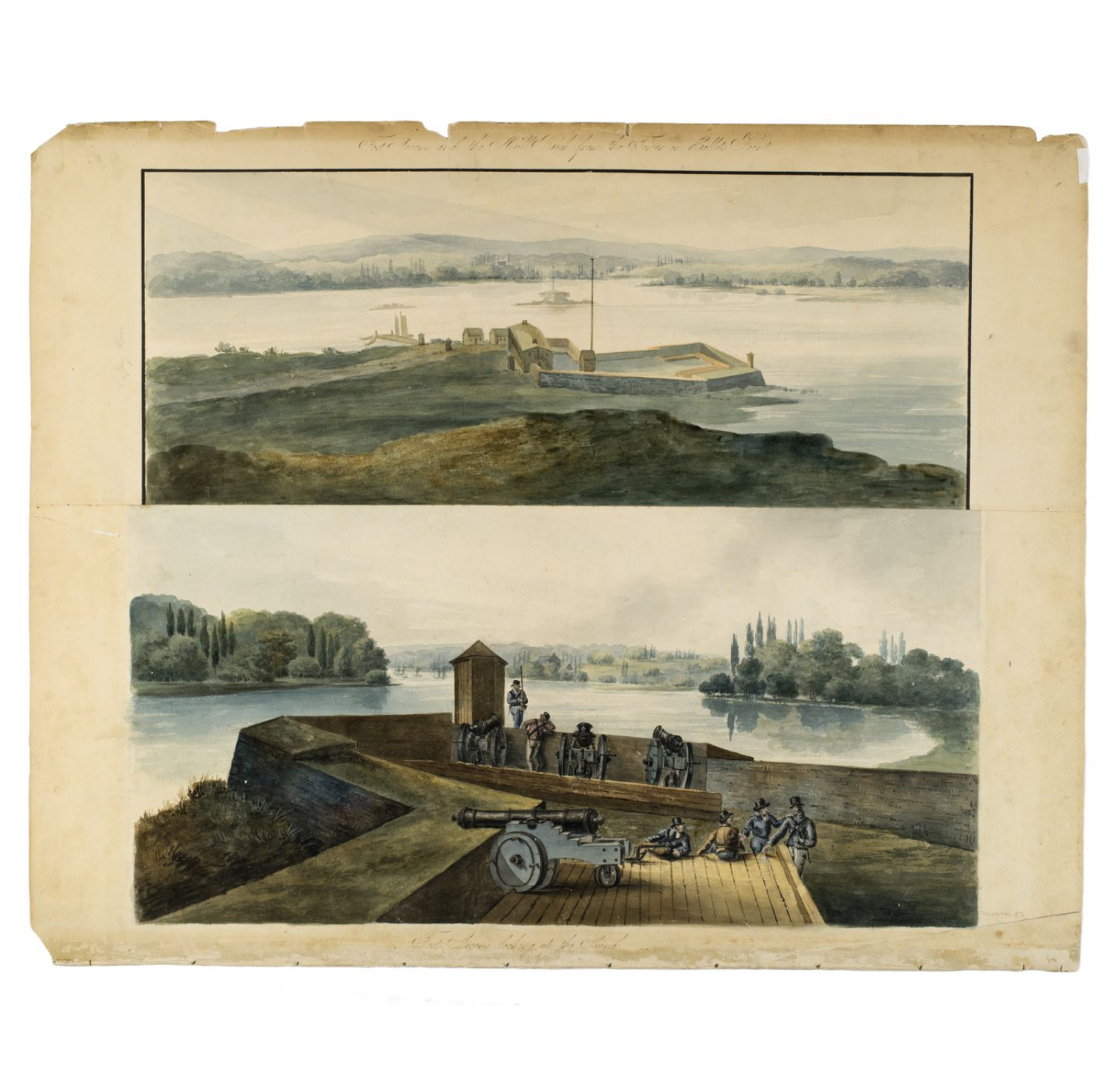
Painting of Fort Stevens from 1814

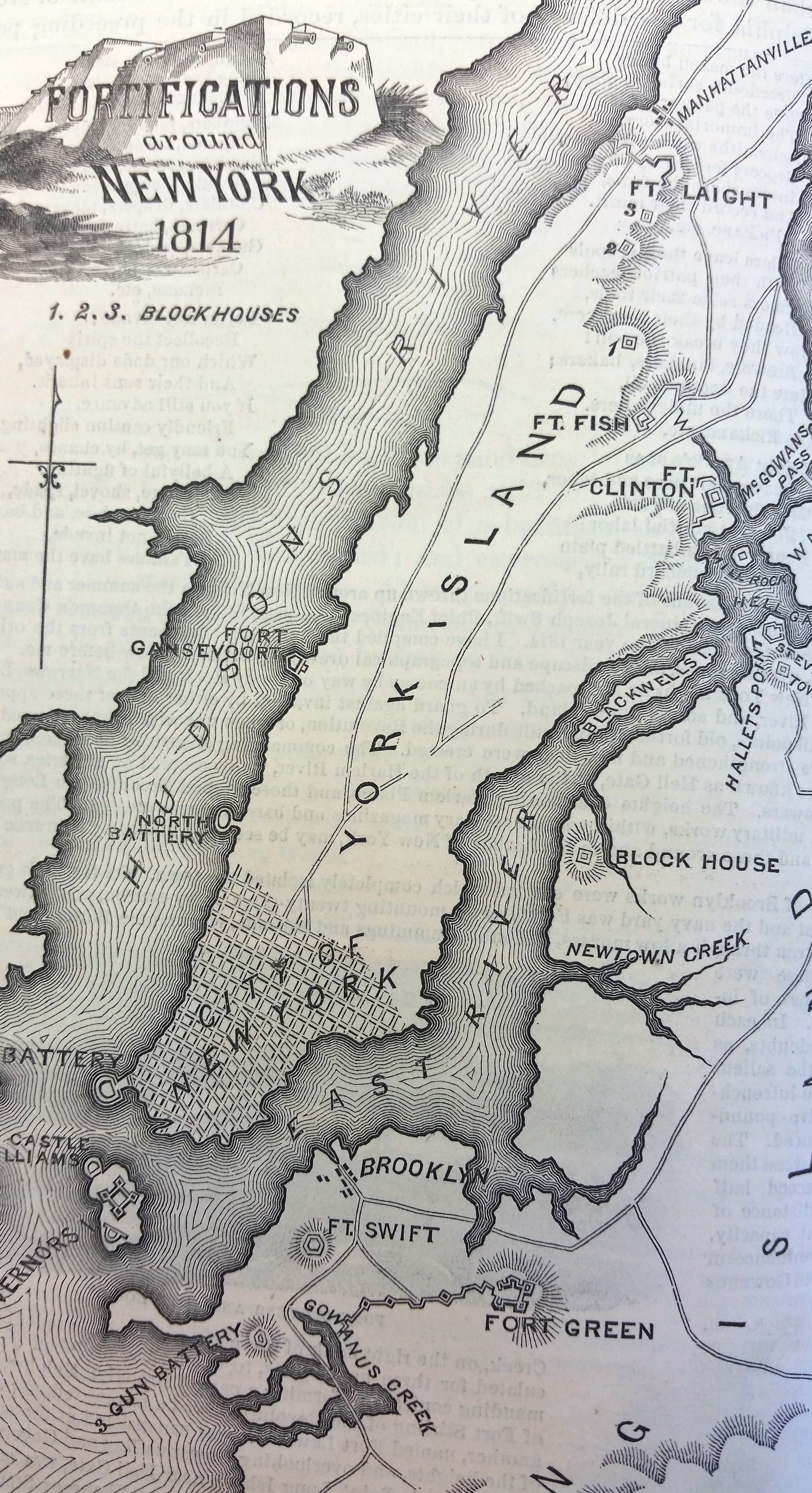
Ft. Stevens (right edge) was part of the northern defenses of New York during the War of 1812, alongside Ft. Clinton, Ft. Fish, and Ft. Laight.

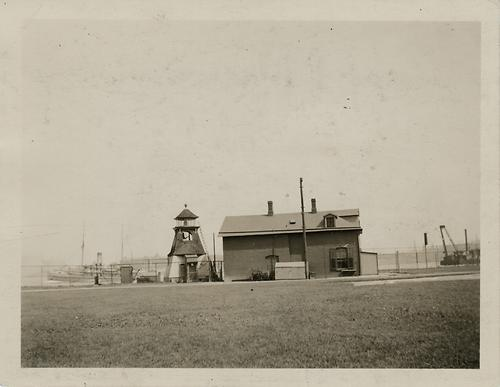
The main building of Fort Stevens (pictured 1922) was used as a lighthouse keepers residence until 1982

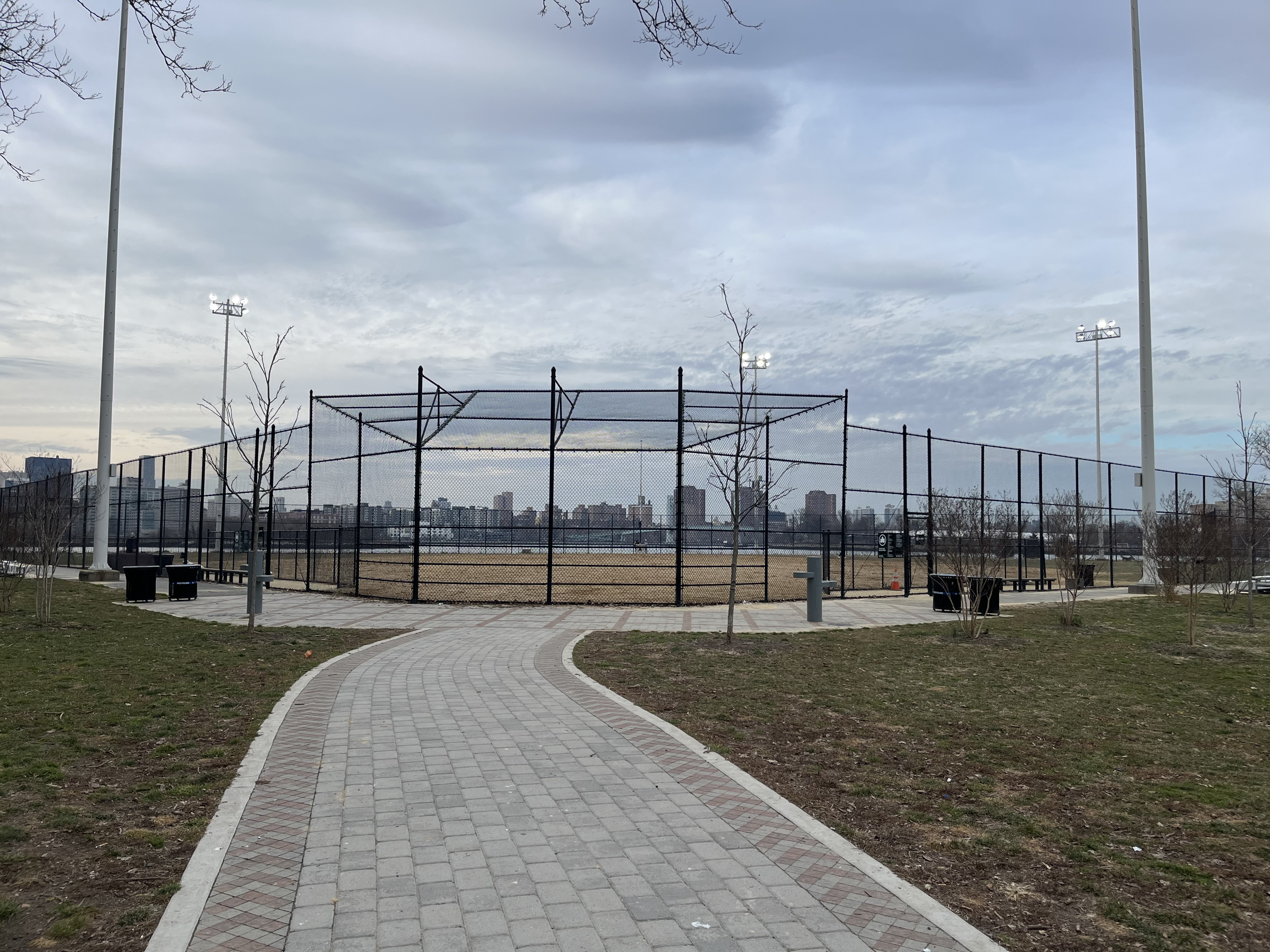
The former site of Fort Stevens in 2024, now occupied by a baseball field
