= John Austin Stevens (banker) =

American banker (1795-1874)

- Born: January 22, 1795; New York City, U.S.
- Died: October 19, 1874 (aged 79); New York City, U.S.
- Education: Yale University
- Occupations: Merchant, banker
- Spouse: Abigail Perkins Weld (m. 1824)
- Children: John Austin Stevens Jr.
- Parent(s): Ebenezer Stevens; Lucretia Ledyard Stevens
- Relatives: Alexander Hodgdon Stevens (brother)

John Austin Stevens, Sr. (January 22, 1795 – October 19, 1874) was an American banker who was the son of Revolutionary War General Ebenezer Stevens and father of Sons of the Revolution founder John Austin Stevens.

== Early life ==
Stevens was born on January 22, 1795, in New York City. He was the youngest of four sons of American Revolutionary War soldier and merchant Ebenezer Stevens, and Lucretia (née Ledyard) Sands Stevens, herself the widow of Richardson Sands (brother of Joshua and Comfort Sands). His brother was Alexander Hodgdon Stevens, a surgeon who served as the second President of the American Medical Association from 1848 to 1849.

He graduated from Yale University in 1813, where he was a member of Brothers in Unity and the Linonian Society, one of the university's oldest secret societies.

== Career ==
After graduating from college, Stevens entered mercantile life, and became a partner in his father's business in 1818. He was for many years secretary of the New York Chamber of Commerce, and one of the organizers and the first president of the Merchants' Exchange. From its first establishment in 1839 until 1866, he was president of the Bank of Commerce. He was a Whig in politics, but an earnest advocate of low tariffs.

He was chairman of the committee of bankers of New York, Boston, and Philadelphia which first met in August 1861, and decided to take $50,000,000 of the government 7.30 loan. They subsequently advanced $100,000,000 more, and the terms of the transactions were arranged chiefly by Stevens, as the head of the treasury note committee. His advice was frequently sought by the officers of the United States Department of the Treasury during the American Civil War.

For many years, Stevens was a governor of the New York Hospital, and took an interest in other benevolent institutions.

== Personal life ==
In 1824, Stevens was married to Abigail Perkins Weld, the daughter of Benjamin Weld of Boston (the namesake of Weld, Maine). Together, they were the parents of:

- John Austin Stevens (1827–1910), a historian who founded the Sons of the Revolution.
- Caroline Weld Stevens (1828–1904), who married Alfred Colvill (1810–1878) in 1860.
- Lucretia Ledyard Stevens (1830–1907), who married Richard Heckscher (1822–1901).
- Mary Emeline Stevens (1833–1895), who married Maurice Bonjour de Limoelan and Peter Remsen Strong.
- Abigail Austin Stevens (1836–1913), who married Gen. Robert Brown Potter (1829–1887), a son of Bishop Alonzo Potter, in 1865.
- Gertrude Stevens (1841–1926), who married William Bordman Rice (1824–1899) in 1869 and was a leader in the New York State Charities Aid Association

Stevens died on October 19, 1874, in New York City.
