= Alexander Hodgdon Stevens =

American surgeon

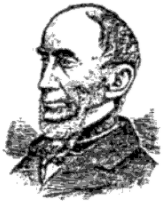
- Born: September 4, 1789; New York City, New York, U.S.
- Died: March 30, 1869 (aged 79); New York City, New York, U.S.
- Education: New York College of Physicians and Surgeons
- Alma mater: Yale University; University of Pennsylvania Medical School
- Occupation: Surgeon
- Spouses: Mary Jane Bayard (died 1823) Catherine Morris (m. 1825; died 1838) Phoebe Coles Lloyd (before 1869)
- Parent(s): Ebenezer Stevens; Lucretia Ledyard Sands Stevens
- Relatives: John Austin Stevens (brother); John A. Stevens Jr. (nephew); Byam K. Stevens (nephew)

Alexander Hodgdon Stevens (September 4, 1789 – March 30, 1869) was an American surgeon who served as the second President of the American Medical Association from 1848 to 1849.

== Early life ==
Stevens was born in New York City on September 4, 1789. He was one of eleven children born to New York City merchant Ebenezer Stevens. His mother was Lucretia (née Ledyard) Sands Stevens. From his father's first marriage, he was a half-sibling to Horatio Gates Stevens and Rebecca Hodgden (née Stevens) Schermerhorn, wife of John Peter Schermerhorn (a brother of Abraham Schermerhorn). Among his full-siblings were Samuel Stevens; William Stevens; Henry Hewgill Stevens; Mary Lucretia (née Stevens) Rhinelander; John Austin Stevens, father of John A. Stevens Jr.; and Byam Kerby Stevens, who married Frances Gallatin (daughter of U.S. Secretary of the Treasury and Ambassador Albert Gallatin) and was the father of Byam K. Stevens Jr.

He graduated from Yale University in 1807, studied in the office of Edward Miller, attended medical lectures in the New York College of Physicians and Surgeons and at the University of Pennsylvania Medical School, and received his M.D. from the latter institution in 1811. His thesis on “The Proximate Causes of Inflammation” was praised by medical men.

== Career ==
After graduating from Medical School, Stevens traveled to France with the object of pursuing surgical studies, but, on being captured by an English cruiser and taken into Plymouth, he went to London and received instruction from John Abernethy and Astley Cooper for a year, and then studied for a year longer under Alexis Boyer and Baron Larrey in Paris.

On his return to the United States, he was appointed a surgeon in the United States Army. Establishing himself in New York City, he was elected professor of surgery in the New York medical institution in 1814. When appointed surgeon to the New York Hospital in 1818, he introduced the European system of surgical demonstrations and instruction at the bedside. In 1825 he became professor of the principles and practice of surgery in the College of Physicians and Surgeons. He became professor of clinical surgery in 1837, but in the following year resigned his active duties in this institution and in the college, and thenceforth acted mainly as a consulting surgeon, both in public and private practice. He was appointed consulting surgeon to the New York hospital, and emeritus professor in the College of Physicians and Surgeons, of which he was made president in 1841.

He was president of the American Medical Association in 1848–49. In 1848, he was elected as a member to the American Philosophical Society. In 1849 he received from the New York State University the degree of LL.D. He retired from the presidency of the college faculty in 1855.

== Personal life ==
Stevens was married three times: firstly to Mary Jane Bayard (1792–1823); secondly to Catherine Morris (1801–1838), a granddaughter of Lewis Morris, in 1825; and thirdly to Phoebe Coles Lloyd (1818–1907).

== Published works ==
Besides his contributions to medical periodicals, he published:

- Inflammation of the Eye (Philadelphia, 1811)
- Cases of Fungus Haematodes of the Eye (New York, 1818)
- Medical and Surgical Register, consisting chiefly of Cases in the New York Hospital, with John Watts Jr., and Valentine Mott (1818)
- Astley Cooper, First Lines of Surgery, editor (1822)
- Clinical Lecture in Injuries (1837)
- Lectures on Lithotomy (1838)
- Address to Graduates (1847)
- Plea of Humanity in Behalf of Medical Education, an address before the New York state medical association (Albany, 1849).
