= John Austin Stevens =

American government advisor (1827-1910)

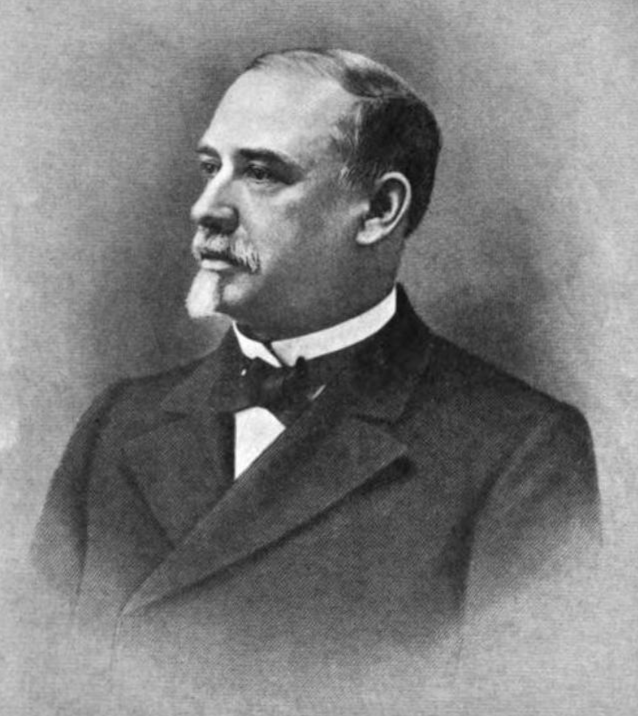
- Born: January 21, 1827; New York City, U.S.
- Died: June 16, 1910 (aged 83); Newport, Rhode Island, U.S.
- Burial place: Green-Wood Cemetery
- Education: Harvard University
- Known for: Founder of the Sons of the Revolution
- Spouse: Margaret Antoinette Morris (m. 1855)
- Parent(s): John Austin Stevens; Abigail Perkins Weld
- Relatives: Ebenezer Stevens (grandfather)

John Austin Stevens Jr. (January 21, 1827 – June 16, 1910) was a leader of business, an adviser of government and a student of the American Revolution. While he was born to a prominent banking family with political connections, it was his interest in U.S. history and his founding of Sons of the Revolution for which he is best known.

== Early life ==
Stevens was born on January 21, 1827, in New York to John Austin Stevens Sr., and Abigail Perkins Weld. Stevens' father was a prominent banker who introduced his son to future U.S. secretary of the treasury Salmon P. Chase and others from New York, Philadelphia and Washington.

Stevens was a grandson of Ebenezer Stevens who had served as a participant of the Boston Tea Party and later as a lieutenant colonel during the Revolution. Ebenezer escorted General George Washington at his triumphal entry at New York on November 25, 1783, when British troops evacuated the city, and served in 1799 as an honorary pallbearer for Washington during a New York service after his death and burial at Virginia. Ebenezer also cofounded the Society of the Cincinnati in 1783 with Lieutenant Colonel Alexander Hamilton and other officers of the Continental Army.

In 1842, at age 15, Stevens was enrolled at Harvard University. He graduated in 1846 with a proficiency in mathematics, logic and literary composition, and thoroughly versed in English and Spanish literature. While attending college, he accompanied his class to hear U.S. secretary of state Daniel Webster speak at the site of the Battle of Bunker Hill. The speech moved Stevens deeply and led him to the lifelong belief that honoring patriot ancestors was a duty.

== Career ==
After Stevens graduated from college, he moved to New York where he worked initially as a cashier before he established a trading business with Cuba. He also joined and served as an officer of the New York Chamber of Commerce.

In 1860, Stevens joined his father to organize a large political rally for the election of Abraham Lincoln as the president of the United States. After Lincoln was elected, Stevens assisted the President during the Civil War by helping organize logistics for the Union Army, managing an expedition to Texas and arranging for a $150 million loan to finance the war. Stevens also raised a regiment of volunteers and helped to organize a corps for the conquest of the Carolina coast.

The Lincoln Administration workers offered to appoint Stevens to various government jobs including those of consul general to Paris, commissioner of Internal Revenue and registrar of the Treasury. Stevens visit Lincoln on the morning before his assassination to urge him to name a day of national rejoicing over the peace at the end of the war.

Stevens joined his family in 1868 for a five-year tour of Europe where he witnessed the downfall of the Second French Empire, fled Paris during the Franco-Prussian War and helped organize American aid to the French after the Siege of Paris. He returned to New York to take an active role in business, government and the study of U.S. history.

=== Writing ===
Stevens' study of history led him to write many articles and several books about the subject. He authored articles from 1877 to 1893 for The Magazine of American History with Notes and Queries, and in 1882 and 1890 for Harper's Magazine.

Among his books, Stevens authored a biography about U.S. Secretary of the Treasury Albert Gallatin in 1883 which was published by Houghton, Mifflin and Co. as part of its American Statesmen Series.

=== Sons of the Revolution ===
After Stevens was denied membership with The Society of the Cincinnati because of its rules of primogeniture, he founded Sons of the Revolution on February 22, 1876, at New York. He intended to include members by recognizing any descendant of a revolutionary ancestor, and held a preliminary meeting on December 18, 1875, at New-York Historical Society at New York. At a secondary meeting held in January 1876, the first SR constitution was adopted and a flier which invited members was published.

The fledgling group languished for several years until December 4, 1883, when an elaborate "turtle feast" dinner was held in the Long Room of Fraunces Tavern at lower Manhattan in New York to commemorate the centennial of the dinner and speech of Washington where he bade farewell to his officers of the Continental Army in the room by saying "[w]ith a heart full of love and gratitude, I now take leave of you. I most devoutly wish that your latter days may be as prosperous and happy as your former ones have been glorious and honorable." At the end of the 1883 dinner, the SR constitution was signed by more than 40 new members, and the group was reorganized as the Sons of the Revolution in the State of New York Inc. with Stevens as its president.

Stevens declined reelection as president of the Sons of the Revolution in a letter addressed to its annual meeting on December 4, 1884. Stevens declined reelection in protest to the decision by the membership to raise funds for the construction of the pedestal for the Statue of Liberty. The reason for Steven's disagreement was that Stevens viewed the Sons of the Revolution as being an exclusive social organization not to be involved with external matters.

In the early years after the reorganization, Society of the Cincinnati President-General Hamilton Fish gave much support and encouragement to the New York society. He referred often to its members as the "younger brothers of the Cincinnati."

General Society Sons of the Revolution President Frederick Tallmadge presented the society Founder's badge to Stevens on October 28, 1898, and wrote that "[t]he noblest tribute that can be paid to your patriotism is the fact that the Society organized by you now numbers over two thousand members, that, of itself, is the proudest monument you could ask for to your energy and patriotism."

Stevens was also a member of the General Society of Colonial Wars.

== Personal life ==
On June 5, 1855, Stevens married Margaret Antoinette Morris (1830–1911), a daughter of William Lewis Morris, in New York. Together, they were the parents of one son and two daughters, none of whom married:

- Abby Weld Stevens (1857–1939)
- Mary Morris Stevens (c. 1857–1943), who wrote poetry, both unpublished and published, and often contain political themes.
- John Austin Stevens III (1859–1909)

After he completed his service as the first president of Sons of the Revolution, Stevens moved to and lived the last 20 years of his life in Newport, Rhode Island where he continued to write about history and cultivated roses.

Stevens died at his home at 73 Rhode Island Avenue in Newport on June 16, 1910. His funeral service was held there on June 18. A second service was held on June 21 at St. Paul's Chapel in New York, and a procession through the city was conducted by Sons of the Revolution, Chamber of Commerce and Historical Society leaders. The procession was viewed by uncovered thousands where it moved down Broadway to Fraunces Tavern which was draped in black. The interment was in the family vault in Green-Wood Cemetery where his Revolutionary grandfather, Ebenezer, also lies.

== See also ==
- Sons of the Revolution
- New-York Historical Society
- Chamber of Commerce of the State of New York
