= Sons of the Revolution =

Patriotic society

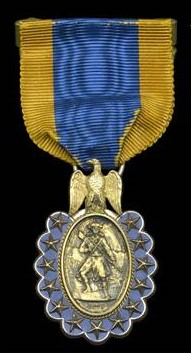
- Ceremonial badge
- Named after: American Revolution
- Established: February 22, 1876 (first state society); April 19, 1890 (General Society)
- Founder: John Austin Stevens Jr.
- Founded at: New York City
- Type: Patriotic society
- Tax ID no.: 23-6269069
- Legal status: Nonprofit corporation
- Headquarters: 412 West Francis Street, Williamsburg, Virginia
- Coordinates: 37.269293°N 76.706717°W
- Region served: Worldwide
- Official language: English
- Publication: Drumbeat
- Website: sr1776.org

The Sons of the Revolution (SR), formally the General Society of the Sons of the Revolution (GSSR), is a patriotic society headquartered at Williamsburg, Virginia, United States.

A nonprofit corporation, the Sons of the Revolution was founded by John Austin Stevens Jr. on February 22, 1876, in New York City. The organization is governed by a board of managers, an executive committee, officers, standing committees and their members, and staff. It includes 28 state societies and chapters worldwide. The Sons of the Revolution's objectives are to maintain and extend "perpetuate the memory of the men, who in the military, naval and civil service of the Colonies and of the Continental Congress by their acts or counsel, achieved the Independence of the Country, and to further the proper celebration of the anniversaries of the birthday of Washington, and of prominent events connected with the War of the Revolution; to collect and secure for preservation the rolls, records, and other documents relating to that period; to inspire the members of the Society with the patriotic spirit of the forefathers; to promote the feeling of friendship among them."

== Membership ==
Membership is open to "Any male person above the age of eighteen years, of good character, and a descendant of one who, as a military, naval, or marine officer, soldier, sailor or marine, in actual service, under the authority of the original thirteen Colonies or States or of the Continental Congress, and remaining always loyal to such authority, or a descendant of one who signed the Declaration of Independence, or of one who, as a member of the Continental Congress or of the Congress of any of the Colonies or States, or as an official appointed by or under the authority of any such legislative bodies, actually assisted in the establishment of American Independence by services rendered during the War of Revolution, becoming thereby liable to conviction of treason, against the government of Great Britain, but remaining always loyal to the authority of the Colonies or States, or who served honorably in a military or naval expedition against the British during the War of the Revolution under the authority of the French or Spanish governments."

Junior, senior and life memberships are also available. Members receive benefits which include:

- Invitation to general-society, state-society and chapter events, including the triennial meetings and the annual Let Freedom Ring celebrations
- Issues of the general-society quarterly, Drumbeat
- Availability of accoutrements, including membership certificate, rosette, formal and informal insignia, and other regalia

Based on the President's message from 2015, there are approximately 5,000 members.

== History ==
=== Founding ===
Sons of the Revolution was founded on February 22, 1876, in New York City, primarily by leading members of the Society of the Cincinnati and the businessman John Austin Stevens. He disagreed with Society of the Cincinnati requirements limiting membership to the eldest male descendants based on the rules of primogeniture. Stevens held a preliminary meeting on December 18, 1875, at the New-York Historical Society at New York. At a second meeting held in January 1876, the first constitution was adopted and a flier which invited members was published.

After a few years of little activity, an elaborate "turtle feast" was held on December 4, 1883, in the Long Room of the historic Fraunces Tavern. The banquet was to commemorate the centennial of General George Washington's farewell speech there to his officers. The 1883 dinner helped recruit 40 new members, and the group was reorganized as the Sons of the Revolution in the State of New York Inc. In the early years after the reorganization, Society of the Cincinnati President-General Hamilton Fish gave support and encouragement to the New York Society. In his obituary, he described Sons members as "Younger brothers of the Cincinnati".

=== Formation of state societies ===
From the beginning, the Society's membership included both residents of New York City and gentlemen from nearby states with business or other ties in the city. In 1884 the Society constitution was amended to provide that state societies may organize as "auxiliary branches", and the growth in membership by 1888 made this more likely. The first of the new state societies, the Pennsylvania Society of Sons of the Revolution, was organized on April 3, 1888. This was accomplished chiefly through the efforts of John W. Jordan, later librarian of the Historical Society of Pennsylvania, and Josiah Granville Leach.

The creation of the Pennsylvania Society started a debate over the Society constitution, particularly over who would charter or create new state societies. The Pennsylvania Society was created by members independent of the New York Society. On March 11, 1889, The Sons of the Revolution in the District of Columbia was chartered by the New York Society.

This debate was resolved by the creation of the General Society. The General Society constitution was proposed on February 12, 1890, in Philadelphia and adopted on March 8, 1890, in New York. Members of the three state societies held a meeting on April 19, 1890, in Washington to inaugurate the General Society. The General Society charters new societies but, "The State Societies shall regulate all matters respecting their own affairs".

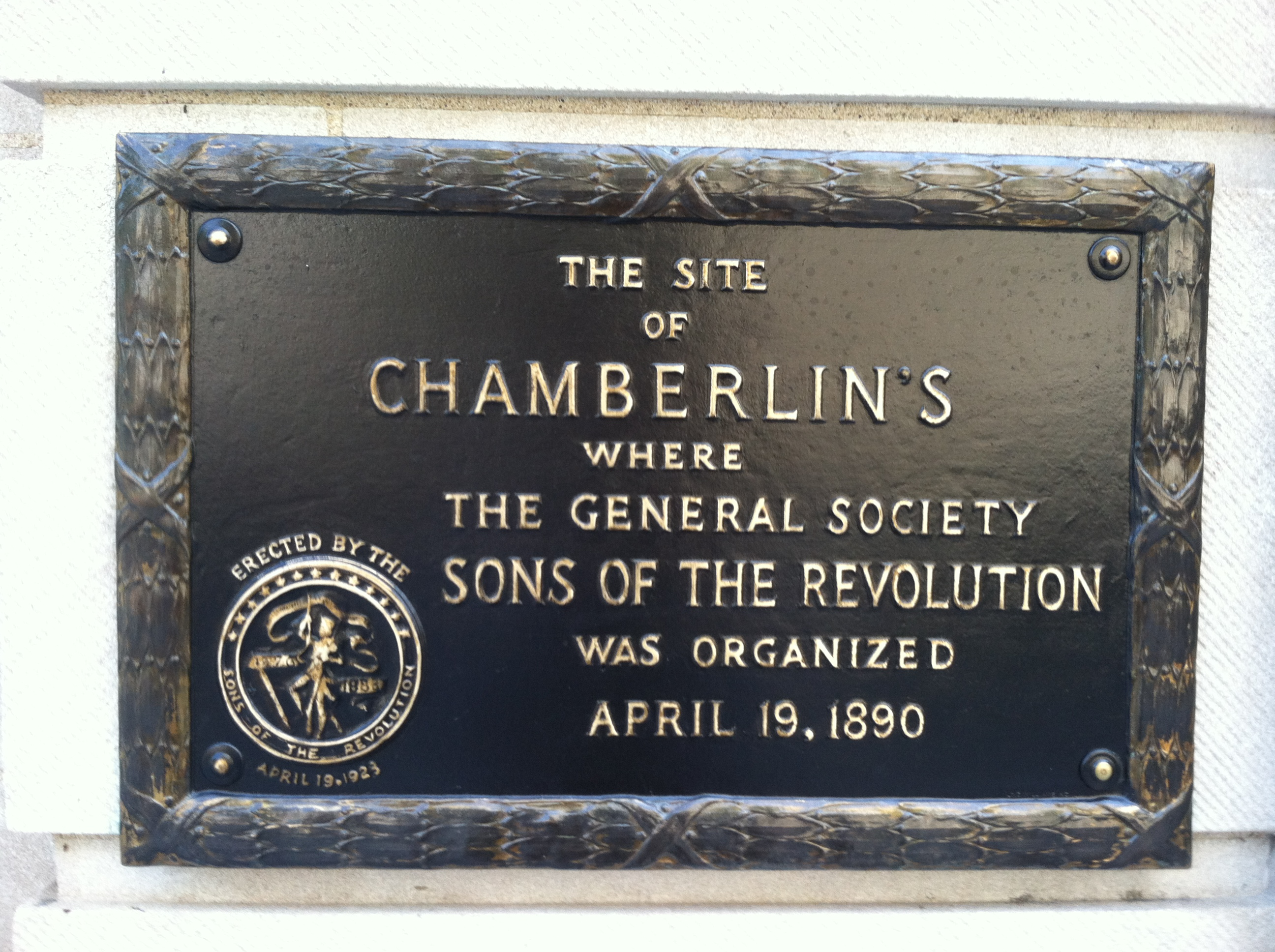
The Sons of the Revolution plaque in Washington, D.C.

In the next few years, several more state societies were formed and the General Society developed a more national character.

== Purpose ==
The General Society and state societies offer patriotic, historical and educational activities for their members and the public. In addition to various dinners, exhibits and holiday events, the societies organize the following specific activities. Several state societies own and operate historic buildings.

=== Triennial general meetings ===
Since its founding, the General Society has held triennial meetings of the membership. The 41st meeting was held on October 4 through 7, 2012 in Savannah, Georgia, by the Georgia society. The 42nd meeting was held on October 1 through 4, 2015, in Williamsburg, Virginia, by the Virginia Society.

=== Citizen awards ===
The General Society has established various citizen awards, given to individuals and state societies for their work to continue the SR mission and honor the memory of the participants of the Revolution. The awards include the Modern Patriot Award, the Patrick Henry Award, the Jay Harris Award, the Richard Farmer Hess Leadership Award, the Trent Trophy, the Membership Achievement Award and the Presidential Commendation of Merit.

=== Fraunces Tavern ===
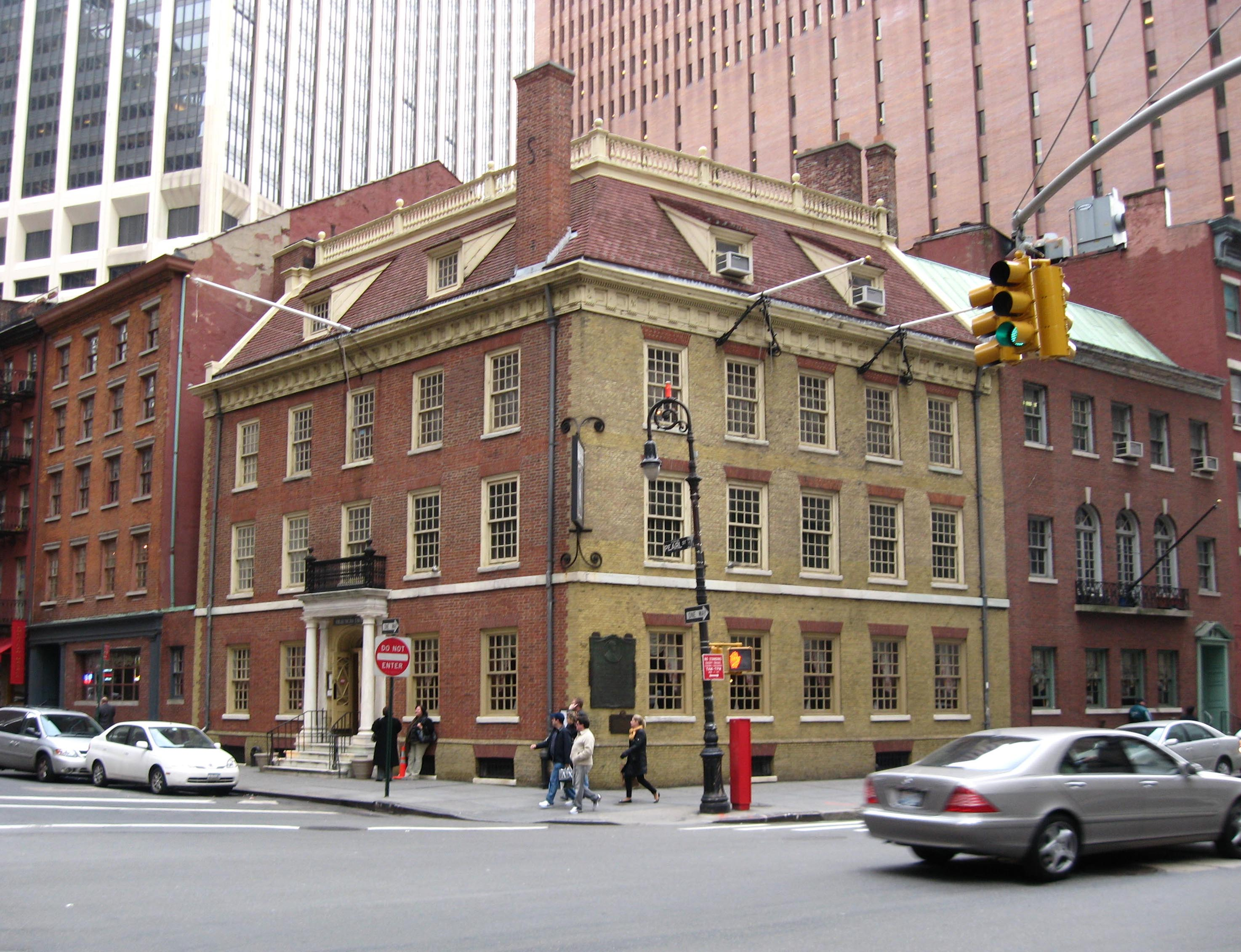
Fraunces Tavern at the southeast corner on Pearl Street at Broad Street at lower Manhattan in New York

Since 1904, the New York Society has owned and operated the Fraunces Tavern as a museum and restaurant. They restored the building, which had a prominent place in pre-Revolution and Revolution history. The society claims the tavern is Manhattan's oldest surviving building.

The Fraunces Tavern Museum maintains several galleries of art and artifacts about the Revolution, including the McEntee "Sons of the Revolution" Gallery that displays much of the Society history.

=== Green End Fort ===
The Rhode Island society has maintained Green End Fort, in the Village of Green's End on the border of Newport and Middletown, since 1969 when its owner, Newport Historical Society, "expressed hope that the Sons would 'maintain the Fort as a memorial and eventually acquire the property.'" The fort was believed to have been built in 1777 by British troops as part of the defenses of Newport, but more recent scholarship indicates it was probably built by the French army under Comte de Rochambeau in 1780.

=== Grave-marker and wreath placements ===
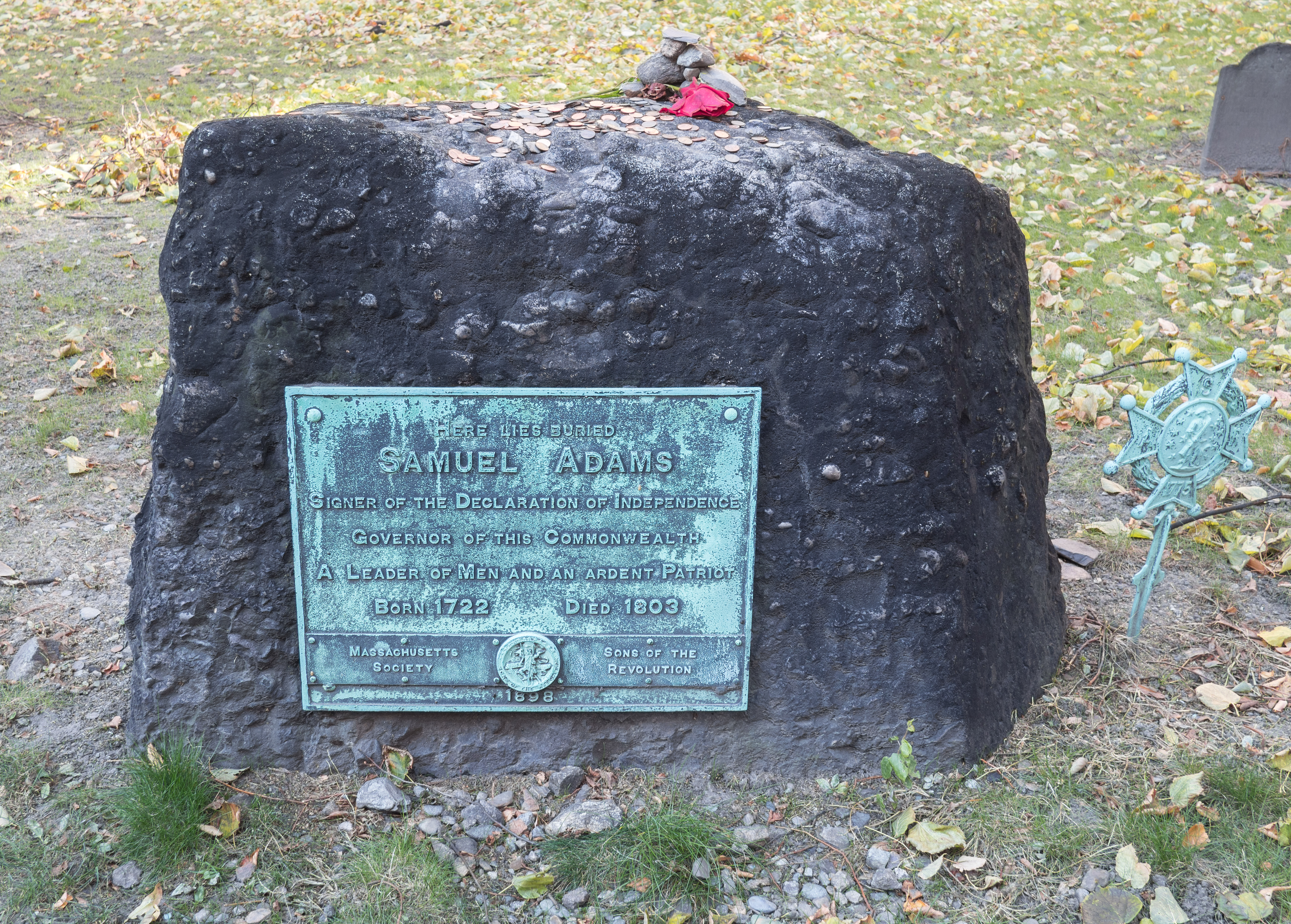
Samuel Adams grave marker with Sons of the Revolution notation in the Granary Burying Ground at Boston

Several state societies have placed Society markers and wreaths at the graves of identified revolutionary patriots; for instance, the Massachusetts society placed markers at the graves of Samuel Adams and James Otis Jr., which are located in the Granary Burying Ground in Boston. The General Society joined the Georgia society in 2005 to place a wreath at the re-interment of U.S. Brigadier General Casimir Pulaski in Savannah, Georgia.

=== "Let Freedom Ring" celebrations ===
Since July 4, 1969, the Pennsylvania society has sponsored "Let Freedom Ring", a nationwide celebration of those who helped achieve the nation's independence during the Revolution. According to U.S. Senate Concurrent Resolution 25 of 1963, bells across the nation are rung 13 times at exactly 2:00 p.m. EDT in honor of the 13 original states represented by the signers of the Declaration of Independence. At the appointed hour, four young descendants of the signers tap Philadelphia's famous Liberty Bell, setting off the chimes of freedom from bell towers throughout the nation. A series of related patriotic festivities take place in the Independence Hall area, including a colorful parade of Revolutionary War flags, fifes and drums, and a wreath-laying ceremony at the Tomb of the Unknown Soldier of the Revolutionary War in Washington Square.

=== Military awards ===
The General Society and several State Societies have established various educational and military awards, which are given to individuals and groups for their academic or service performance. The awards include the Annapolis Cup, which was created in 1905 and given annually by the general society and the Maryland society to a U.S. Naval Academy midshipman; the Knox Trophy (New York), which was created in 1910 and given annually by the New York society to a U.S. Military Academy at West Point cadet; the Capt. Gustavus Conyngham Award which was created in 1999 and given annually by the New York society to a U.S. Merchant Marine Academy at Kings Point midshipman; the Recognition Award, which was created in 2002 and given annually by the Massachusetts society to a U.S. Army ROTC cadet; and the Knox Trophy (Massachusetts), which was created in 1924 and given annually until 1940 by the Massachusetts society to a U.S. Army field-artillery battery and a "redleg" artilleryman.

=== Evacuation Day observances ===
The New York society has organized infrequent Evacuation Day observances of the anniversary of the British departure on November 25, 1783, from New York after the Revolution. After a controversial New York Police Department denial on May 21, 2008, of a New York society application for a parade permit, officials accepted the application on July 30, 2008, for society members to march down Broadway from New York City Hall to Battery Park, "where reenactors in period costumes will lower a Union Jack and raise the Stars and Stripes in a symbolic reprise of what happened in 1783. British and French diplomats, along with others who had roles in the American colonies' struggle for independence," were invited to attend.

== List of notable members ==
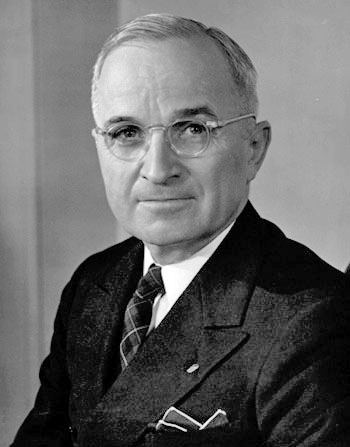
President Harry S. Truman (1884–1972), was a member of the Sons of the Revolution

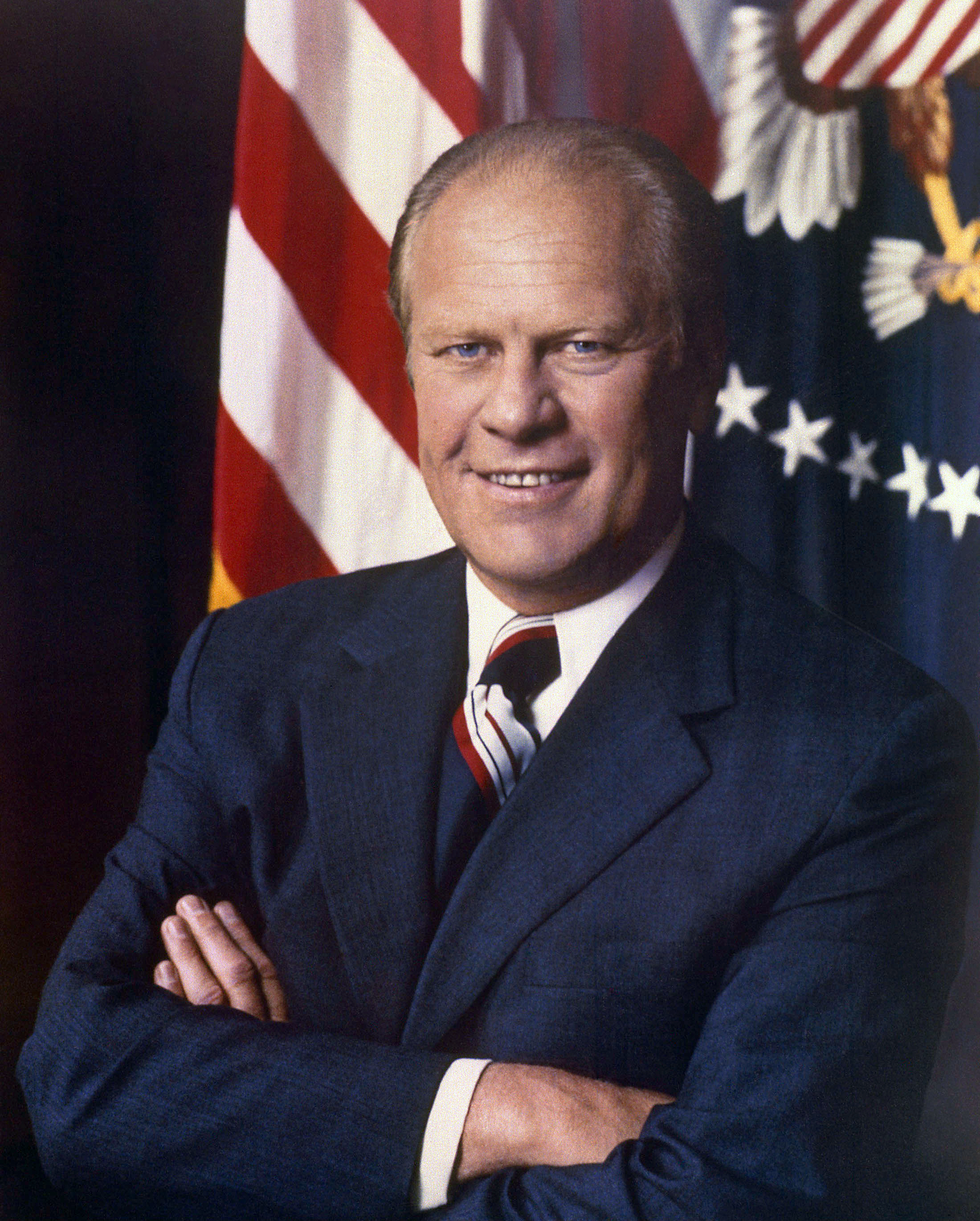
President Gerald R. Ford (1913–2006), was a member of the Sons of the Revolution

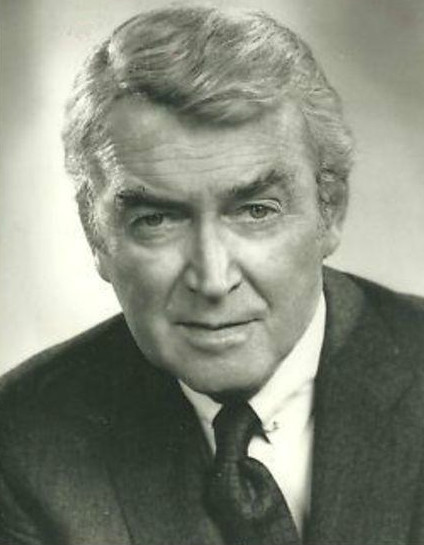
Academy Award Winner James Stewart (1908–1997) was a member of the Sons of the Revolution

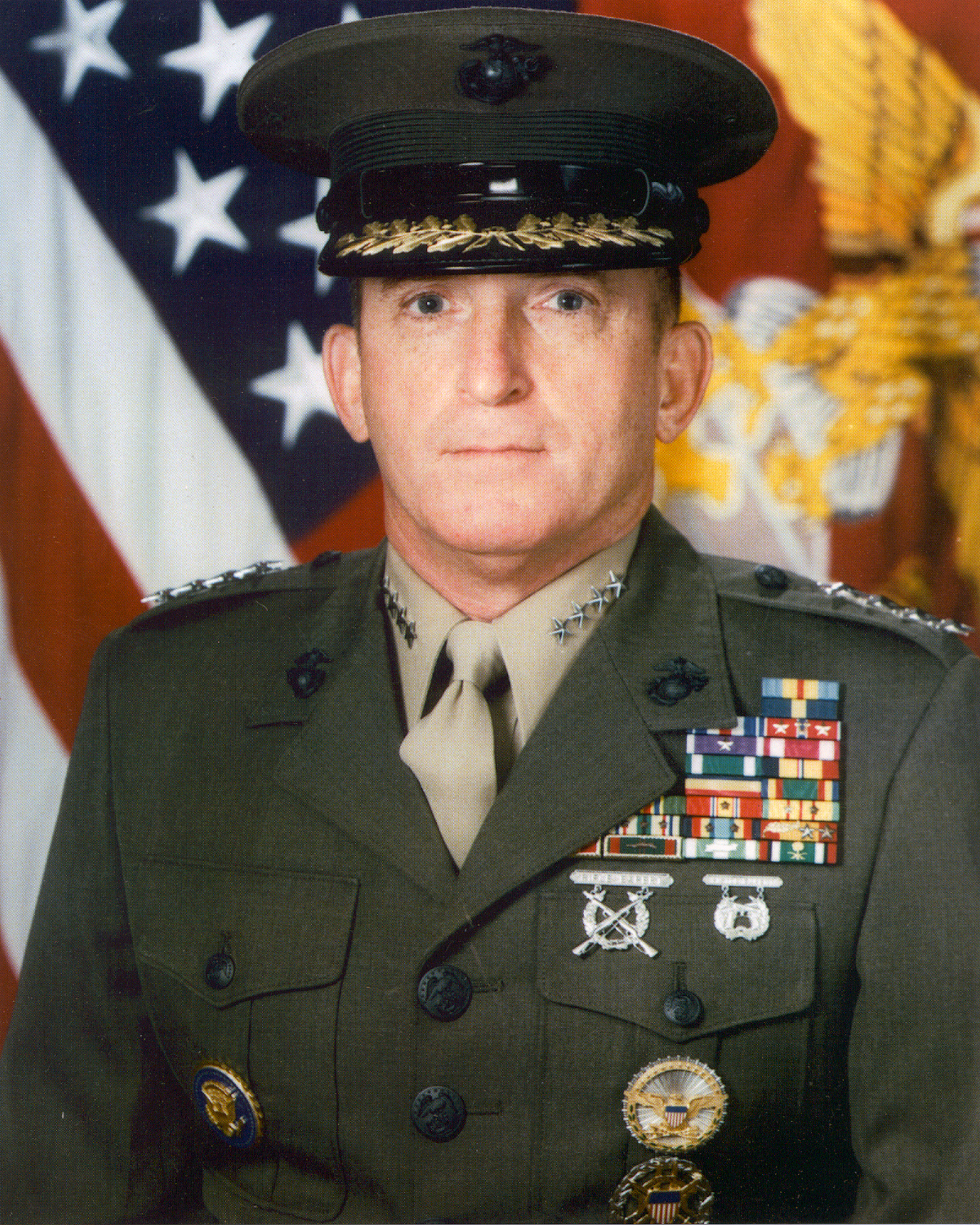
Gen. Charles C. Krulak (born 1942) is a member of the Sons of the Revolution

Many notable celebrities and public leaders in the United States have been members of the Sons of the Revolution.

They include the following persons:

=== Presidents of the United States ===
- George W. Bush of Texas
- George H. W. Bush of Texas
- Gerald Ford of Michigan
- Dwight D. Eisenhower of Kansas
- Harry S. Truman of Missouri
- Herbert Hoover of Iowa
- Theodore Roosevelt of New York
- Benjamin Harrison of Ohio

=== United States senators ===
- U.S. Sen. Lamar Alexander of Tennessee
- U.S. Sen. and Governor Morgan Bulkeley of Connecticut
- U.S. Sen. Cornelius Cole of California
- U.S. Sen. Frank Putnam Flint of California
- U.S. Sen. John McCain of Arizona
- U.S. Sen. Hugh Scott of Pennsylvania
- U.S. Sen. Lawrence Tyson of Tennessee

=== United States representatives ===
- U.S. Rep. Franklin Bartlett of New York
- U.S. Rep. Perry Belmont of New York
- U.S. Rep. Charles E. Bennett of Florida
- U.S. Rep. Thornton G. Berry Jr. of West Virginia
- U.S. Rep. Chester C. Bolton of Ohio
- U.S. Rep. Edmund N. Carpenter of Pennsylvania
- U.S. Rep. Howard Coble of North Carolina
- U.S. Rep. William H. Douglas of New York
- U.S. Rep. Charles I. Faddis of Pennsylvania
- U.S. Rep. E. Hart Fenn of Connecticut
- U.S. Rep. Barry Goldwater Jr. of California
- U.S. Rep. Benjamin F. James of Pennsylvania
- U.S. Rep. Jefferson M. Levy of New York
- U.S. Rep. George B. McClellan Jr. of New York
- U.S. Rep. Cornelius A. Pugsley of New York
- U.S. Rep. Dana Rohrabacher of California
- U.S. Rep. Jacob van Vechten Olcott of New York

=== Ambassadors ===
- U.S. Ambassador Larz Anderson of Massachusetts
- U.S. Ambassador S.G.W. Benjamin of New York
- U.S. Ambassador Lewis Einstein of New York
- U.S. Ambassador Charles S. Francis of New York
- U.S. Ambassador Hampson Gary of Texas
- U.S. Ambassador George A. Gordon of New York
- U.S. Ambassador Franklin Mott Gunther of the District of Columbia
- U.S. Ambassador John Langeloth Loeb Jr. of New York
- U.S. Ambassador J. William Middendorf of Rhode Island
- U.S. Ambassador Richard C. Patterson Jr. of New York
- U.S. Ambassador Phelps Phelps of Germany
- U.S. Ambassador Charles H. Sherrill of New York

=== Other government officials ===
- Secretary of the Interior James Rudolph Garfield of California
- Secretary of the Interior Ethan A. Hitchcock
- Secretary of War John W. Weeks of Massachusetts
- Secretary of the Treasury and Federal Judge William Adams Richardson
- Governor of Maryland John Lee Carroll
- Governor of West Virginia Arch A. Moore Jr.
- Governor of New Mexico Territory LeBaron Bradford Prince
- Panama Canal Zone Gov. Chester Harding of the District of Columbia
- Assistant Secretary of the Navy Charles H. Darling of Vermont
- Attorney for the Southern District of New York William Hayward of New York
- Attorney for the District of Connecticut Francis H. Parker of Connecticut
- Civil Service Commission Member William Gorham Rice of New York
- Mayor of New York George B. McClellan Jr.
- Los Angeles City Council member George P. McLain
- Consul Charles H. Delavan of New York
- Consul Augustin W. Ferrin of New York
- Consul Thomas H. Norton of New York
- Consul James R. Parsons Jr. of New York
- Court of Appeals for the 2nd Circuit Judge J. Edward Lumbard of New York
- Federal Trade Commission Chairman Robert E. Freer of Ohio
- Solicitor General James M. Beck of Pennsylvania
- U.S. Treasurer Daniel Nash Morgan of Connecticut

=== Military and naval officers ===
- Admiral of the Navy George Dewey, USN of Vermont
- Commandant of the Marine Corps Gen. Charles C. Krulak, USMC of California
- Commandant of the Marine Corps Col. Charles Grymes McCawley, USMA of the District of Columbia
- Quartermaster General of the Army Charles G. Sawtelle, USA of the District of Columbia
- Vice Admiral Howard Fithian Kingman, USN of California
- Maj. Gen. Frank Ross McCoy
- Maj. Gen. William Denison Whipple, USA of New York
- Brig. Gen. and Medal of Honor recipient Richard Napoleon Batchelder, USA of the District of Columbia
- Brig. Gen. John Ross Delafield
- Brig. Gen. Morris Cooper Foote of New York
- Brig. Gen. Royal T. Frank, USA
- Brig. Gen. Green Clay Goodloe, USMC of the District of Columbia
- Brig. Gen. Lyman W. V. Kennon, USA of Rhode Island
- Brig. Gen. Charles L. McCawley, USMC of the District of Columbia
- Brig. Gen. Samuel Mills, USV
- Brig. Gen. and Medal of Honor recipient Edmund Rice, USA of Massachusetts
- Brig. Gen. and Academy Award-winning actor James Stewart, USAFR of California
- Brevet Maj. Gen. Nicholas Longworth Anderson, USA
- Brevet Maj. Gen Harrison Gray Otis, USA of California
- Brevet Brig. Gen. DeLancey Floyd-Jones, USA of New York
- Chaplain (Colonel) Michael A. Milton, USA-R of North Carolina
- Col. Charles Greenlief Ayers, USA of New York
- Col. J. Fulmer Bright, USA of Virginia
- Col. Bibb Graves, USA of Alabama
- Col. Lawrence D. Tyson, USA of Tennessee
- Col. Stephen Edward Huskey, USA of Texas
- Lt. Col. Asa Bird Gardiner, USA of New York
- Maj. Pierre Christie Stevens, USA of the District of Columbia
- Brevet Maj. James Edward Carpenter, USA of Pennsylvania
- Lt. Orlando Henderson Petty, USN, Medal of Honor recipient of Pennsylvania

=== Distinguished citizens ===
- Historian, author, genealogist and heraldist Henry L. P. Beckwith
- American author and screenwriter James Warner Bellah of California
- Financier Perry Belmont of Rhode Island
- Atchison, Topeka and Santa Fe Railway President Samuel T. Bledsoe of California
- Actor Richard Dix of California
- 1932 Summer Olympics President William May Garland of California
- Naval Historian John B. Hattendorf of Rhode Island
- Studebaker Corporation President Paul G. Hoffman of California
- Railroad executive Henry E. Huntington of California
- Bank of America founder Orra E. Monnette of California
- Geologist and explorer Raphael Pumpelly of Rhode Island
- Businessman Frederick H. Rindge of California
- Motion-picture Director W. S. Van Dyke of California
- Science-fiction writer Robert A. Heinlein of Missouri
- President & CEO Pathmark Consulting & Design Mark M. Jakobowski of Virginia. General President, Sons of the Revolution

== See also ==
- List of hereditary and lineage organizations
