= Amritjit Singh =

Indian-born American literary scholar

- Born: October 20, 1945 (age 80); Rawalpindi, India
- Citizenship: India (by birth); United States (naturalized)
- Education: New York University (PhD); Kurukshetra University (MA); Panjab University (BA)
- Occupations: Literary Scholar; Professor Emeritus
- Known for: African American Literary Studies; Ethnic American Literary Studies; South Asian Studies; Postcolonial Theory
- Children: Samir; Reshma

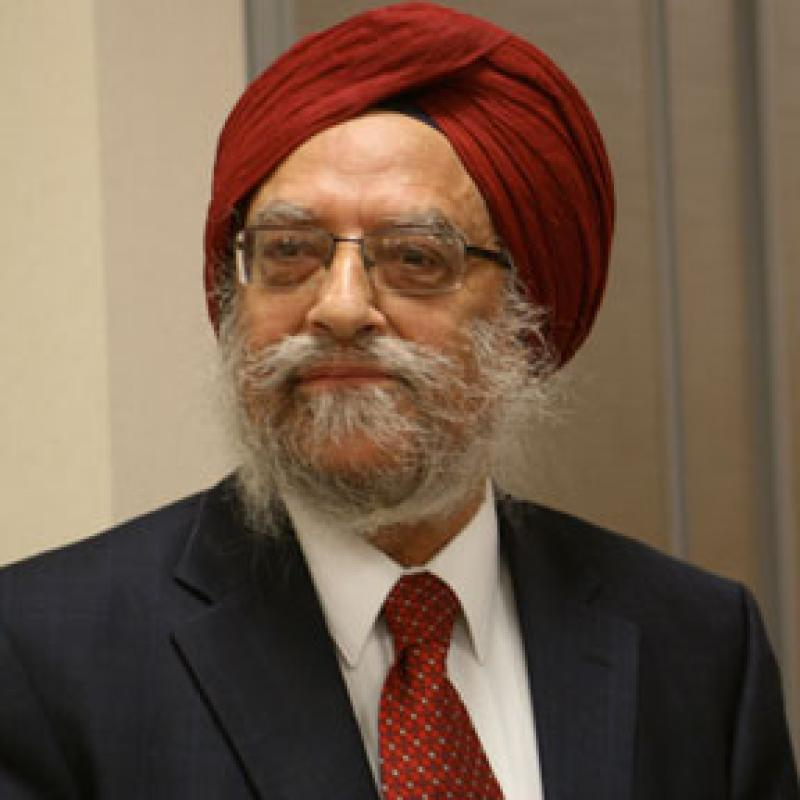
Amrtijit Singh

Amritjit Singh (born 1945) is an Indian-born American literary scholar known for his contributions to African American, ethnic American, and South Asian literary studies. He is professor emeritus of English and African American Studies at Ohio University, where he held the Langston Hughes Professorship. His scholarship in books such as The Novels of the Harlem Renaissance (1976), Postcolonial Theory and the United States: Race, Ethnicity, and Literature (2000), and The Collected Writings of Wallace Thurman: A Harlem Renaissance Reader (2003) has been noted for its contributions to African American literary history as well as comparative approaches to ethnic and postcolonial studies in the United States. Singh has served as president of the South Asian Literary Association (SALA) and the Society for the Study of the Multi-Ethnic Literature of the United States (MELUS). A 2017 festschrift, Crossing Borders, was published in his honor. He has lectured widely in North America, South Asia, Japan, South Korea, Germany, Austria, Egypt, Ghana, and South Africa.

== Early life and education ==
Singh was born in 1945 in Rawalpindi (then British India) and grew up in Ambala Cantonment, India. He studied at Panjab University and Kurukshetra University before completing a Ph.D. in English at New York University in 1973. His doctoral dissertation, The Novels of the Harlem Renaissance: A Thematic Study, was supervised by William M. Gibson, James W. Tuttleton, and novelist Ralph Ellison.

== Academic career ==
Singh began his teaching career at the University of Delhi in 1965, holding positions at several institutions including the University of Rajasthan, New York University, and the Herbert H. Lehman College of CUNY. Between 1974 and 1977, he served as Academic Associate and deputy director of the American Studies Research Centre (ASRC) in Hyderabad, then the largest American Studies collection outside the United States.

From 1986 to 2006, Singh taught at Rhode Island College, where he was named the Mary Tucker Thorp Professor of Arts and Sciences and received a Distinguished Faculty Award. In 2006, he joined Ohio University as Langston Hughes Professor of English and African American Studies and was named professor emeritus in 2019.

Singh has held visiting appointments at several institutions including the University of California, Berkeley; Wesleyan University; College of the Holy Cross; and University of Calgary. Singh has received many fellowships from organizations such as the Fulbright Program, Ford Foundation, American Council of Learned Societies, Bellagio Center (Rockefeller Foundation), and National Endowment for the Humanities.

Singh has had editorial roles for the journals MELUS and the South Asian Review, and was senior editor of the Multi-Ethnic Literatures of the Americas (MELA) Series published by Rutgers University Press.

== Scholarship ==
Singh's research focuses on African American Studies, ethnic American literatures, South Asian Studies, and postcolonial theory, with an emphasis on transnational and comparative approaches. His work has examined the relationships between race, migration, and literary production in relation to the United States and South Asia.

His edited collections have received attention in forums such as American Literary History, where they are noted for their comparative treatment of ethnic American and postcolonial literatures. His books have also been reviewed in MELUS and related journals within the context of multi-ethnic American literary studies. Singh's Postcolonial Theory and the United States: Race, Ethnicity, and Literature (2000) was referenced in overviews of postcolonial and American studies, including Postcolonial Studies: The Key Concepts and American Culture Studies: An Introduction to American Culture. Additionally, his work, including The Novels of the Harlem Renaissance (1976), has been noted for its pioneering contribution to critical studies of African American literary history in publications such as African American Review.

Since the 1980s, Singh has also made notable contributions to South Asian literary studies, as demonstrated in publications such as Indian Literature in English, 1827–1979: A Guide to Information Sources (1981) and the co-edited special issue of Comparative Literature Studies (2016) focused on comparative South Asian literatures. From 1975 to 1983, he published book reviews and review articles in India, as demonstrated in publications such as Indian Book Chronicle.

== Honors and recognition ==
In 2007, Singh received the Lifetime Achievement Award from MELUS. In 2014, he was awarded the Distinguished Achievement Award in Literary Scholarship by the South Asian Literary Association and Ohio University's Faculty Award for Excellence in Global Engagement.

In 2017, Fairleigh Dickinson University Press published a festschrift in his honor: Crossing Borders: Essays on Literature, Culture, and Society in Honor of Amritjit Singh.

== Selected publications ==
Singh has authored, edited, or co-edited more than fifteen books, including:

- The Novels of the Harlem Renaissance (1976; ISBN 978-0-271-01208-7)
- Indian Literature in English, 1827–1979: A Guide to Information Sources (1981; ISBN 978-0-8103-1238-8)
- India: An Anthology of Contemporary Writing (1983; ISBN 978-0-8214-0736-3)
- The Harlem Renaissance: Revaluations (1989; ISBN 978-0-8240-5739-8)
- American Studies Today: An Introduction to Methods and Perspectives (1995; ISBN 978-81-86318-08-9)
- Memory, Narrative, and Identity: New Essays in Ethnic American Literatures (1994; ISBN 978-1-55553-203-1)
- Memory and Cultural Politics: New Approaches to American Ethnic Literatures (1996; ISBN 978-1-55553-254-3)
- Postcolonial Theory and the United States: Race, Ethnicity, and Literature (2000; ISBN 978-1-4968-0021-3)
- The Collected Writings of Wallace Thurman: A Harlem Renaissance Reader (2003; ISBN 978-0-8135-3301-8)
- Interviews with Edward W. Said (2004; ISBN 978157806366)
- Revisiting India's Partition: Essays on Memory, Culture, and Politics (2016; ISBN 978-1-4985-3105-4)
- Critical Perspectives on Chitra Divakaruni: Feminism and Diaspora (2022; ISBN 978-1-4985-5618-7)

He has also edited reprint editions of works by Wallace Thurman and Richard Wright

== Poetry and translation ==
Singh's own poetry and his translations from Punjabi literature have appeared in journals such as South Asian Review, Re-Markings, Kavya Bharati, Edinburgh Review, New Letters, and Toronto Review of Contemporary Writing Abroad. In 2011, he published The Circle of Illusion, a volume of translations of Punjabi poems by Gurcharan Rampuri, co-translated with poet Judy Ray.
