= The Fruit of the Tree =

1907 novel by Edith Wharton

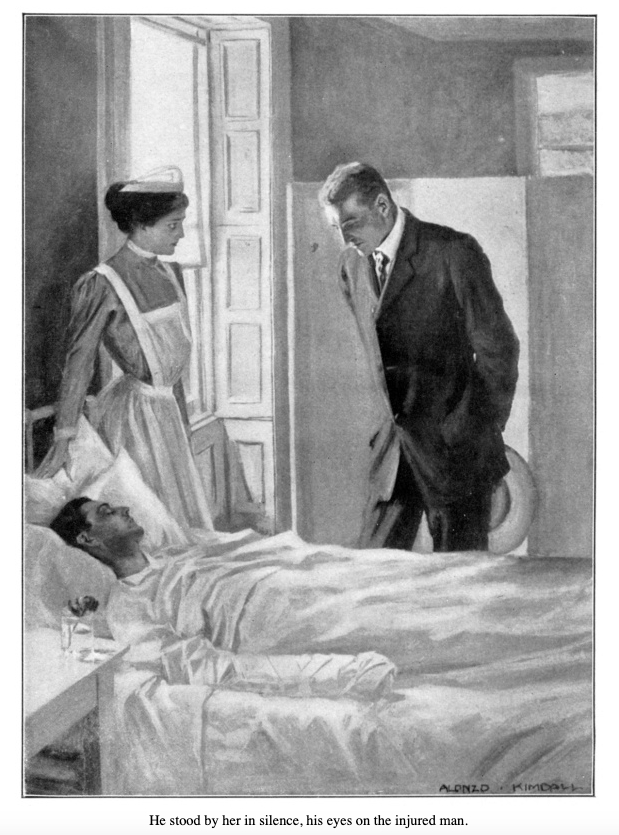
- Frontispiece illustration, 1907.
- Author: Edith Wharton
- Illustrator: Alonzo Kimball
- Published: October 19, 1907; 119 years ago
- Publisher: Charles Scribner's Sons
- Publication place: U.S.
- Pages: 633
- Preceded by: The House of Mirth
- Followed by: The Reef
- Text: The Fruit of the Tree online

The Fruit of the Tree is the third full-length novel by Edith Wharton, published in New York by Charles Scribner's Sons in 1907, with illustrations by Alonzo Kimball. Often considered a problem novel, The Fruit of the Tree, unique in Wharton's fiction, focuses on two contemporary social themes: industrial reform and the ethics of euthanasia.

== Plot and characters ==
Its story involves the intertwined lives of two major characters, John Amherst and Justine Brent, with a third character, Bessy Westmore, serving as a link between them. The setting is the fictional New England mill town of Westmore, in western Massachusetts, just after the turn of the twentieth century. Amherst, assistant manager at the Westmore cotton mill, is thwarted in his efforts to improve working conditions at the mill, under the control of the wealthy absentee Westmore family. He meets the recently widowed Bessy Westmore, of the owning family. They fall in love and marry. Now, as an owner, Amherst has the power to improve the working environment at the mill. At first, Bessy, sympathetic with his goals, is supportive. But, a spoiled child, she withdraws into a more self-centered life, and she and John drift apart. Then, a bad fall in a riding accident sends Bessy to the hospital in excruciating pain. She dies unexpectedly. Some time later, Justine Brent, her nurse, whom John Amherst had known earlier, and Amherst are drawn together and she becomes his second wife. When it is revealed that Bessy's unexpected death was the result of Justine's administering an overdose of a narcotic, the shock, nearly breaking apart Amherst's second marriage, leads to exploration of the novel's second major theme, the ethics of euthanasia.

With the working out of its themes through the bitter experiences of the novel's protagonists, the title The Fruit of the Tree alludes to the story of Adam and Eve in the Bible. (Note: The title was apparently suggested by a friend and adopted by Wharton as perfectly appropriate.)

== Critical reception ==
The Fruit of the Tree enjoyed positive reviews on its publication, (Note: See, for example, the anonymous review of "The Fruit of the Tree. By Edith Wharton.", in The Athenaeum, no. 4181, December 14, 1907.) but it never attained the popularity of The House of Mirth or Wharton's Pulitzer Prize–winning The Age of Innocence. Its publication engendered controversy, as well, over the accuracy of the depiction of the mill scenes as well as of the "unprofessional" behavior of Justine Brent as a nurse. In commentary written decades later, critic James W. Tuttleton finds much of interest in the novel, but he also contends that overall it is not successful, the tension between the two major themes "breaking its back". According to biographer Hermione Lee, however, the novel, "for all its awkwardness, is an ambitious, courageous, and tough piece of work."

The Fruit of the Tree was the last novel Wharton completed before leaving America for good, residing as an expatriate in Europe for the rest of her life.

== Bibliography ==
- [Anonymous review.] "The Fruit of the Tree. By Edith Wharton". December 14, 1907.The Athenaeum, no. 4181, p. 762
- Tuttleton, James W. (1995). "The Fruit of the Tree: Justine; or, the Perils of Abstract Idealism". In Bell, Millicent (ed.). The Cambridge Companion to Edith Wharton. Cambridge: Cambridge University Press. pp. 157–68. ISBN 978-0-521-48513-5.
- Benstock, Shari (1994). No Gifts from Chance: A Biography of Edith Wharton. New York: Charles Scribner's Sons. ISBN 978-0-684-19276-5.
- Lee, Hermione (2007). Edith Wharton. New York: Alfred A. Knopf. ISBN 978-0-375-40004-9.
- Wolff, Cynthia Griffin (1987). Introduction. Roman Fever and Other Stories. By Wharton, Edith. New York: Collier Books. pp. ix–xx. ISBN 978-0-02-026485-9.
