= Berkshire Opera Company =

The Berkshire Opera Company was an American opera company located in Lee, Massachusetts. The company was founded in 1985 by Rex Hearn and closed in 2009. Amongst the highlights of the company's history were:

- In 1986, the company performed the first professional production of Mozart's "L'oca del Cairo" (The Goose of Cairo), English lyrics by Sheldon Harnick (Fiddler on the roof) at Cranwell Opera House in Lenox, Massachusetts.
- The 1998 production of Gian Carlo Menotti's The Consul which was recorded on the Newport Classic label immediately following the final performance and was the first complete commercial recording ever made of the opera.
- The 1999 world premiere of Stephen Paulus' opera Summer in collaboration with the Boston Symphony and the Tanglewood Music Festival. The opera, which is set in the Berkshires, is based on the novel of the same name by Edith Wharton.

Performances were held at Cranwell Opera House from 1985 until 1992, when the Opera company sought new venues: Pittsfield's Colonial Theatre and The Mahaiwe in Great Barrington, Massachusetts.
