= The Eyes (short story) =

Short story by Edith Wharton

- Short story by Edith Wharton

Publication
- Publisher: Scribner's Magazine
- Publication date: June 1910

"The Eyes" is a short story written by Edith Wharton, a prolific writer best known for The Age of Innocence and The House of Mirth. It was first published in a June 1910 edition of Scribner's Magazine, along with a collection of nine other short stories titled Tales of Men and Ghosts.

== Summary ==
"The Eyes", approximately eight thousand words, details an aging American gentleman named Andrew Culwin, recounting his experiences with the supernatural to two guests late in the evening, a tale that takes place in his bygone youth. The story is told from an unknown narrator, described as a party guest. After settling in to spend the winter with his aunt in New York, Culwin starts to build a relationship with his cousin, Alice Nowell, leading to a sexual encounter. After this encounter, they become engaged (as Culwin understands it to be the right thing to do), and he promises to bring her with him to Europe very soon. That night, he finds himself watched by a pair of supernatural eyes that fill him with immense fear. The next morning, he flees the house and spends the next evening elsewhere, and the eyes do not reappear. He decides to move to Europe for multiple years, leaving Alice behind.

He lives happily in Europe for many years, without seeing the eyes. As he is working on writing a book, a young man named Gilbert Noyes visits him, having been sent from New York by Alice Nowells. She requests that Culwin help Gilbert improve his literary skills and become successful, yet Culwin quickly notices that he has little talent. He later sees the eyes again when he decides to encourage Gilbert Noyes, who Culwin claims has no chance of being successful. He is scared he will lose Gilbert and disappoint his cousin Alice one again if Gilbert fails. The eyes appear every night until Culwin informs Noyes of the truth during a falling out. At the end of this recounting, he looks into the mirror, seeing the eyes once again. With the rejection of the only present female character and its inclusion of several male homosocial bonds, more than one scholar has pointed out homosexual themes in the text.

== Characters ==
=== Andrew Culwin ===
Andrew Culwin serves as the protagonist of the story, and the individual at the center of the supernatural events of the story. The story presents him as a wealthy upper-class man, an Epicurean, who hosts dinners at his home in his old age. These dinners are the method with which the audience is introduced to Andrew Culwin, as he tells the tale of his supernatural encounters in his youth to two of guests of said dinners, one of which being the narrator of the short fiction piece.

=== Alice Nowell ===
Alice Nowell, Andrew Culwin's cousin and temporary lover. Once they had intercourse, Andrew asked her to marry him, having the understanding that it was the correct thing to do. This is the first time he saw the eyes, leading him to flee to Europe. Once he fled, he promised to continue to send notes to her. She later sends him Gilbert Noyes, who Culwin assists out of obligation to her.

=== Phil Frenham ===
Phil Frenham is a young gentleman involved in Andrew Culwin's social circle at the beginning of the story, an example of the younger men Culwin involve in his social circles. He, along with the narrator, hear Culwin's supernatural experience. Frenham's reaction to the story has been interpreted in different ways, with him putting his head down on a table and refusing to meet Culwin's eyes. Some parallels have been made between Frenham and Noyes, specifically the taking of advice and emotional cues from Culwin.

==== Gilbert Noyes ====
Gilbert Noyes is a young aspiring author related to Alice Nowell that Andrew Culwin takes under his wing in Europe. According to Culwin, the boy has no talent, but Culwin encourages him anyway and spends a "delicious summer" abroad with him. He relies on Culwin for advice, paralleling Phil Frenham in Culwin's future, and Noyes ends up in China with a reputation for drinking after his continuous failed attempts to publish work resulted in a falling out with Culwin.

== Themes ==
=== Homosexuality ===
Scholars have pointed out that Culwin's social bonds and interactions can be read as queer, labeling the interactions with Alice Nowell in the beginning of Culwin's story as an attempt at performing heterosexuality as would be expected of him as an upper-class gentleman of the time.

Further evidence is found within his relationship with Gilbert Noyes, noting the length of time Culwin spends describing the physical attractiveness of Gilbert Noyes. This is also involved with the theming of shame due to the homophobia present in the time period.

=== Shame ===
According to many critics such as Urbas and Crow, The Eyes reflect self-shame. At the end of the story, the character sees the eyes once again. “Culwin saw the reflection also. He paused, his face level with the mirror as if scarcely recognizing the countenance in it as his own. But as he looked his expression gradually changed, and for an appreciable space of time he and the image in the glass confronted each other with a glare of slowly gathering hate.” In this story, the eyes reflect his shame, first showing up after having relations with his cousin Alice Nowells, then when Gilbert Noyes fails as an author, and lastly when detailing his story.

=== Supernatural ===
During the time of the Eyes, Edith Wharton became quite engrossed by the supernatural. Wharton herself that in her late 20s she was still frightened by the supernatural and ghost stories. Critics such as Shari Berstock hypothesize that she used these ghost stories to conquer her fear.
