= Summer (Wharton novel) =

1917 novel by Edith Wharton

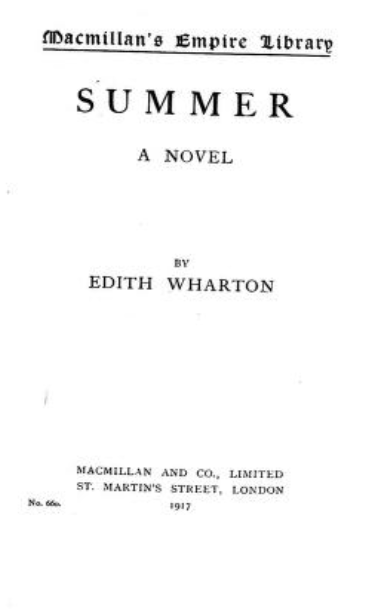
- Title page for Summer (1917)
- Author: Edith Wharton
- Language: English
- Publisher: Charles Scribner's Sons
- Publication date: August 23, 1917
- Media type: Print (hardback & paperback)
- Pages: 194
- Text: Summer online

Summer is a novel by Edith Wharton, which was published in 1917 by Charles Scribner's Sons. While most novels by Edith Wharton dealt with New York's upper-class society, this is one of two novels by Wharton with rural settings. Its themes include social class, the role of women in society, destructive relationships, sexual awakening and the desire of its protagonist, named Charity Royall. The novel was controversial at the time of its publication and is one of the less famous among her novels because of its subject matter.

== Synopsis ==
At the start of the novel, Charity Royall is bored with her life in the small fictional New England town of North Dormer in [western Massachusetts]] near the Berkshires. She was born to poor parents from "up the mountain" who gave her up to the town's learned person, Lawyer Royall, and she dreams of a better, more exciting life outside the town. She secures a job at North Dormer's library in an attempt to save money so she can eventually leave the town and Mr. Royall's care. The widowed Mr. Royall makes an inappropriate advance toward her one night which she rebuffs, and it irrevocably sours their relationship.

When she is 17, that exciting life finds her in the form of a visiting architect named Lucius Harney. Her first encounter with the charming young man is at the library, and there is immediate chemistry between them. Soon he finds himself boarding at Mr. Royall's house when his own living arrangements fall through.

Charity Royall finds herself attracted to Lucius and decides to become his companion as he explores the town. He is putting together a book on colonial houses, and the two of them go around town together so he can inspect and sketch the houses as a part of his research. Mr. Royall, who holds onto the idea of marrying Charity, notices the two of them growing close and immediately evicts Lucius from his house. Lucius leaves town and relocates to a nearby village.

Later on, Charity and Lucius visit Nettleton for the Fourth of July, where they kiss for the first time and Lucius gives Charity a brooch. Before they are finished with their outing they run into Mr. Royall, who seems very drunk. Mr. Royall verbally attacks Charity, causing her to feel intense shame, uon which she falls into Lucius's arms. After the day's events, Charity and Lucius grow even closer and have sex for the first time.

After this, the two lovers meet frequently at an abandoned house. Charity becomes fearful when she sees Lucius with Annabel Balch, a local society girl, at a social event. Lucius promises to meet Charity at their usual place, but when she goes there Mr. Royall confronts her. Lucius promises to marry Charity, but excuses himself to move out of town for a while. Later Charity learns that Lucius went out of town with Annabel Balch. Charity writes a bitter letter to Lucius telling him to marry Annabel.

Immediately after these events, Charity begins feeling sick and a doctor confirms that she is pregnant. Having no money to pay for the check-up, Charity gives the doctor the brooch Lucius gave her as collateral. Upon reaching home, she receives a letter from Lucius that confirms that he is going to marry Annabel and that he is pleased she has given him her blessing to do so. This frustrates her until she decides to go look for her long-lost mother in the mountains. However, it turns out to be too late because Charity's mother dies before they can reunite.

While staying at the mountain with her relatives, Charity observes the poverty of the people living there and she vows she will do everything to ensure that her child does not grow up in poverty. She returns home intending to become a prostitute to support her child. However, along the way, she meets again with Mr. Royall and they decide to marry. In the end, she writes a letter to Lucius telling him about her marriage and finally returns home to stay with her husband in North Dormer.

== Major themes ==
=== Coming-of-age ===
The most notable theme in Summer is Charity's coming-of-age. In a style often found in novels, Charity grows from an immature woman who does not understand her world or realities into an adult who can make complex and difficult decisions. Charity's journey with her forbidden lover Lucius Harney helps her to grow and understand herself sexually. When Charity and Harney meet for the fourth of July the imagery reflects the initial excitement, joy, and sense of control Charity receives from her relationship. Charity is able to explore herself and "The romance of this seemingly mismatched couple ‘breaks, or stretches, many conventions of romantic love stories and in the process creates a new picture." Though their relationship is short-lived Charity does not regret it, she is able to come to terms with her situation and keep her pregnancy. Her decision to marry Mr. Royall can also demonstrate her growth, however a young woman in her position would not have had many other options. It can demonstrate Charity's maturity because she is willing to make personal sacrifices for herself and her child.

== Major characters ==
- Charity Royall: She is the major character in the story. A stranger seduces, impregnates and abandons her. In other terms, according to this scenario, dependence can mean security and she therefore ends up marrying for her former guardian.
- Lawyer Royall: The lawyer's feelings towards Charity have been paternal all along until the death of his wife. After this, his heavy drinking helps to tear down the wall securing his growing lust and desire for sexual satisfaction. He keeps his distance away from Charity, hires workers to be in the house and assists her to achieve her desire for independence; however, he is very much pained by these experiences. When Charity's lover abandons her while she is pregnant, her guardian comes in to rescue the situation by marrying her.
- Lucius Harney: Lucius is a young New York architect who enters the life of Charity and entices with the promise of being everything to her life. On the other hand, Charity strongly feels attracted to Lucius and envious of him too. Lucius is hence more than just her summer lover. He is also the symbol of everything that Charity ever imagines for herself.
- Anabel Balch: Annabel on the other hand is not a symbol of everything that Charity Royall does not have; she is the literal reverse of it. Annabel has been described as a blonde lady, blue-eyed, fashionable, educated, and wealthy. She eventually becomes Mr. Lucius Harney's wife.
- Julia Hawes: The character Julia is described as the oldest sister of Charity's best friend Ally. Julia also happened to have been a victim of a love affair, that later left her pregnant and abandoned. However, Julia's case is slightly different since after aborting, she gets into prostitution and has ever since become the persona non grata in the small town. Julia is the cautionary tale which later interferes with Charity's decision making.

== Adaptations ==
An operatic adaptation of Summer, with music by Stephen Paulus and a libretto by Joan Vail Thorne, was premiered by the Berkshire Opera Company in 1999.
