= The Other Two (short story) =

1904 Edith Wharton story

- Short story by Edith Wharton

Publication
- Publisher: Collier’s Weekly
- Publication date: February 13, 1904

"The Other Two" is a short story by Edith Wharton, originally published in Collier’s Weekly on February 13, 1904. It is considered by some critics to be among her best short fiction. Wharton explores themes of marriage, divorce, and social class through the perspective of businessman Mr. Waythorn, shortly after his marriage to the twice-divorced Alice. The story centers on Waythorn's evolving perspective as he encounters both of Alice's former husbands.

== Plot summary ==
The story follows Mr. Waythorn, newly married to Alice, who has been divorced twice. They are part of upper-class New York City society at the end of the Gilded Age.

Waythorn's initial acceptance of Alice's past is challenged when he is forced to interact with her former husbands, Mr. Haskett and Mr. Varick. Their honeymoon is cut short by the illness of Alice's daughter, Lily, from her first marriage to Mr. Haskett. Haskett's involvement in Lily's life necessitates his presence in the Waythorns' home. Later, Waythorn encounters Varick through business dealings, leading to a professional relationship. These interactions with Alice's former husbands alter Waythorn's perception of his wife, revealing her adaptability and the complexities of her past relationships. He observes how she has adjusted her personality to suit each husband, unsettling him.

The story culminates in a chance encounter between Waythorn, Alice, and both ex-husbands. This awkward situation forces Waythorn to confront the reality of Alice's past and the intricacies of human relationships.

== Analysis ==
Gerard M. Sweeney examined the often-overlooked relationship between Alice and Lily, analyzing the impact of Lily's illness on their dynamic. Paul R. Petrie explored the feminist aspects of the story, arguing that Wharton's use of a male narrator grants male characters authority while subtly critiquing patriarchal structures. Donna Campbell analyzed "The Other Two" through the lens of ghost story structure, highlighting the story's comedic elements derived from its social situations. Meltem Kiran-Raw analyzed how characters grapple with their individual feelings of isolation as they form new and unexpected relationships.
