= Fighting France: From Dunkerque to Belfort =

Literary compilation

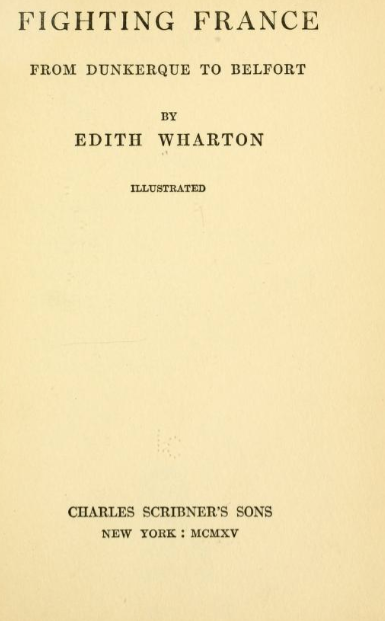
- Title page for Fighting France: From Dunkerque to Belfort (1915)
- Author: Edith Wharton
- Language: English
- Genre: Non-fiction
- Publisher: Charles Scribner's Sons
- Publication date: 1915
- Publication place: United States

Fighting France: From Dunkerque to Belfort is a literary compilation composed, in part, from magazine articles by the American writer Edith Wharton on her time in France during the First World War, including her visits to the French sectors of the Western Front. "Four of the articles originally appeared in Scribner's Magazine" in 1915. "In Alsace" appeared the same year in The Saturday Evening Post. The book's final chapter ("The Tone of France") had not been previously published. Fighting France: From Dunkerque to Belfort was published in 1915 by Charles Scribner's Sons.
