= The Touchstone (novella) =

1900 novella by Edith Wharton

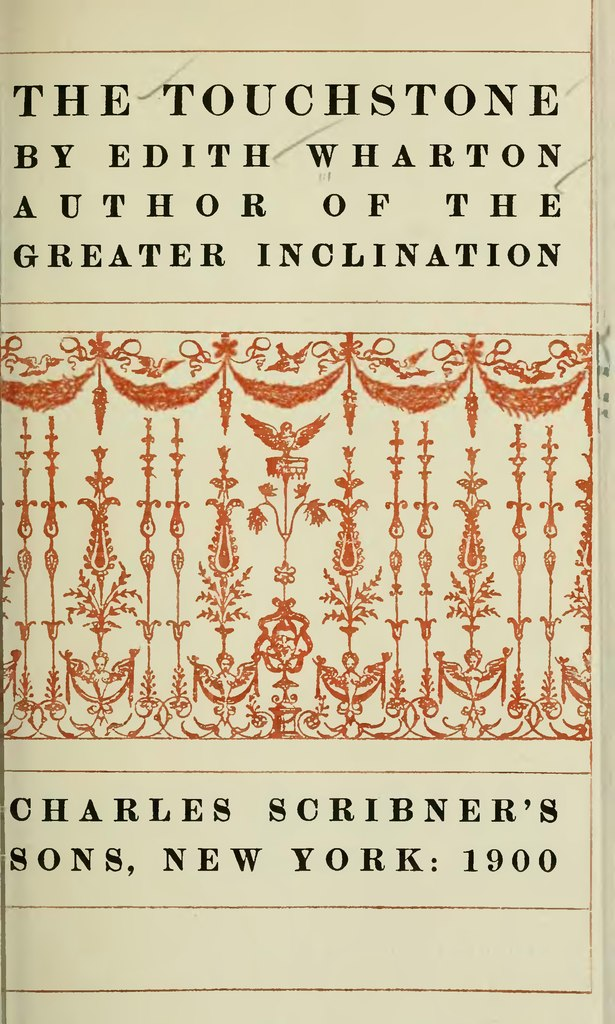
- 1900 first edition title page
- Author: Edith Wharton
- Language: English
- Publisher: Charles Scribner's Sons
- Publication date: June 8, 1900
- Publication place: United States

The Touchstone is a novella by American writer Edith Wharton. Written and published in 1900, it was the first of her many stories describing life in old New York.

Stephen Glennard, the novella's protagonist, is suddenly impoverished and unable to marry Alexa Trent, the woman he loves. He sells the private letters a former deceased admirer named Margaret Aubyn had written to him, before she had become a famous author. He is later overcome by guilt for betraying one who had loved him.

== Synopsis ==
Stephen Glennard's career is rapidly deteriorating and he desperately needs money so that he may marry his beautiful fiancée, Alexa Trent. Glennard happens upon an advertisement in a London magazine promising the prospect of financial gain.

Glennard was once pursued by Margaret Aubyn, a famous and recently deceased author, and he still has her passionate love letters to him. Glennard removes his name from the letters and sells them, making him $50,000 and establishing a marriage based on the betrayal of another.

However, his mounting shame and his guilty conscience ultimately force him to confess his betrayal to his wife, Alexa. Glennard fully expects (and even desires) that his confession will cause Alexa to despise him. However, Alexa's wise and forgiving response opens a way for him to forgive himself and to make what limited amends he can make for his actions.

== Characters ==
Stephen Glennard– A man whose career is deteriorating falls in love with Alexa Trent, and sells the letters of the deceased Margaret Aubyn out of desperation in order to afford his wedding with his fiancée, Alexa.

Alexa Trent– Glennard's attractive and beautiful fiancée and later wife.

Margaret Aubyn– Deceased author who writes passionate love letters to Glennard, which Glennard later sells.

== Analysis ==
The Touchstone is often dismissed as Wharton's early attempt at a sentimentalist work, which she would discard by the publication of The House of Mirth in 1905. Scholar Robin Peel, however, argues against this and notes that the book may be a satire of the genre due to its use of irony.
