= Bunner Sisters =

1916 novella by Edith Wharton

Bunner Sisters is a novella written by American author Edith Wharton, published in 1916. Although she had written the story in 1892, it was rejected twice by Scribner's because of its length and it "being unsuitable to serial publication". It was not published until 1916 in a collection with other shorter works, Xingu and Other Stories. As Nancy Van Rosk writes, "'Bunner Sisters' has had a long history of being overlooked."

== Plot summary ==
Edith Wharton's novella Bunner Sisters is set in 19th century New York, following the lives of sisters Ann Eliza and Evelina Bunner. The sisters lead quiet lives, running their small inconspicuous shop outside of Stuyvesant Square, selling sewing materials, millinery supplies, and mending garments for their customers. While the sisters do everything in their power to liven the shop up, it does not compare to the dreams they once of what the shop could have been. Their reliance on the shop to make their living fosters their sense of co-dependence. The sisters' lives change forever when Mr. Ramy, a local clockmaker and fellow small shop owner, enters, creating the beginnings of a rift between them.

Mr. Ramy is first mentioned when Ann Eliza buys Evelina an inexpensive clock for her birthday. Both sisters feel drawn to Mr. Ramy, viewing him as well educated but in need of having someone to take care of him. As time passes, the three grow closer, eventually leading to Mr. Ramy having dinner at the sisters' shop on a nightly basis. As the sisters' feelings grow for Mr. Ramy, Ann Eliza notices Evelina's feelings; as the elder sister, and out of fear of being too old for marriage, Ann Eliza chooses to step back and allow her sister to find happiness. Shortly after her decision, Mr. Ramy proposes to Ann Eliza, who again denies her own feelings to encourage her sister's. Mr. Ramy then offers his hand to Evelina, who accepts. As a wedding gift, Ann Eliza offers Evelina and Mr. Ramy her savings to allow them to start a new life together.

After Evelina follows her husband to New Orleans, Ann Eliza is left alone in the shop, facing hard economic times and fewer customers. After not hearing from her sister, Ann Eliza finds herself in need of the kind of care that she had previously provided to Evelina. A few friends and neighbors try to help Ann Eliza heal and run the shop.

As her marriage deteriorates, Evelina eventually returns to the shop in need of her sister's care once again. With her sister back, Ann Eliza begins to feel better and returns to her natural caregiving role. The more that is revealed about Evelina's marriage, the more the sisters become out of touch with one another, realizing the difference in the lives they have been living. After learning of her sister's religious belief, Ann Eliza feels even more disconnected from her sister, and the story ends with Ann Eliza resuming a lonely sacrificial life.

== Characters ==
=== Ann Eliza ===
Elder sister, self-sacrificing and deeply loyal to her younger sister, Evelina. She is willing to put Evelina above herself in most situations.

=== Evelina ===
Younger sister to Ann Eliza, Evelina is more romantic and dreamy, yearning for a life beyond the small shop she and her sister run. Her impressionability leads her to fall for Mr Ramy, a decision that sets the tragic events of the story in motion.

=== Herman Ramy ===
German clockmaker from whom Ann Eliza buys a clock for Evelina's birthday, setting off the events of the story.

=== Mrs. Hochmuller ===
A friend of Mr. Ramy, her existence in the story reveals Mr. Ramy's secret life. In the story, she symbolizes the unseen and complicated lives of lower-class women, leaving them to navigate complex relationships and economic challenges on their own.

=== Miss Mellins ===
A seamstress and neighbor of the Bunner sisters, she is known for her gossiping and dramatic storytelling. Her position in the story is mainly adding humor to the story and shows the close-knit, limited social circle of the sisters, further showcasing the limited social opportunities for companionship in their community.

== Symbolism ==
=== The clock ===
The clock that Ann Eliza bought Evelina is a key symbol in Bunner Sisters, The clock can be used to symbolize hope and aspirations, the passage of time, the rise and fall of romance, and sacrifice.

==== Passage of time ====
A clock itself is naturally used to keep time or show the passage of time. Within the story, it can be seen as used to highlight the sisters aging, skipping over their "idea" time of marriage, and limiting their chances for love.

==== Hope and aspiration ====
The clock is bought as a gesture of love from Ann Eliza to Evelina, with the intention of bringing a small amount of joy into the sister's otherwise dull lives. This purchase can be seen as an act of optimism, and symbolizes Ann Eliza's hope for a brighter future despite the current financial situation.

==== Sacrifice ====
At the beginning of the story, the purchase of the clock was a symbol of a financial sacrifice for Ann Eliza, used to show her love and devotion for her sister, further underlining Ann Eliza's generosity and tendency to give up her needs for her sister. Throughout the happenings of the story, The clock becomes a symbol of sacrifice of love with little return.

== Setting ==
The story takes place in a small shop owned by the sisters Ann Eliza and Evelina on a street, described as “already doomed to decline,” that provides a backdrop to their lives. The setting, in late 19th century New York City, depicts the poverty, isolation, and other forces that constrain the sisters' lives. Although they live in New York City, their socioeconomic status provides them with a sense of isolation from those who have found major success in the city. With its simple furnishings, their shop also reflects their status and economic hardships. The sisters' social and economic roles are a direct reflection of the constraints placed on women in the late 19th century.

== Bibliography ==
- Edith Wharton, Bunner Sisters, Grandfather Clock series, flower-ed 2019, ISBN 978-8885628540
