= Pomegranate Seed (short story) =

Short story by Edith Wharton

- Short story by Edith Wharton
- Country: United States
- Language: English

Publication
- Publisher: The Saturday Evening Post
- Publication date: April 25, 1931

"Pomegranate Seed" is a short story by American writer Edith Wharton. This story was first published by The Saturday Evening Post on April 25, 1931. The story was then included in Wharton's collection of short fiction, The World Over in 1936, and in her collection, Ghosts, published in 1937.

== Plot summary ==
Charlotte Gorse Ashby is a middle-aged newlywed to Kenneth Ashby, who is a lawyer and widower. His first wife Elsie passed away two years ago, and he is still reeling from the loss. Kenneth and Elsie have two children, Peter and Joyce, who Charlotte begins to regard as her stepchildren. The family and their governess live in a quiet neighborhood within New York City.

Ever since the couple returned from their honeymoon, strange letters are being delivered to the home, addressed to Kenneth Ashby. Every time a letter is delivered, Kenneth shuts down and becomes isolated and despondent. Kenneth keeps the identity of the letters a secret from Charlotte, which leads to tension in their relationship. Charlotte once adored her life and home, especially the drawing room, but now she struggles to enter it, paranoid that she will find a letter. One day, Charlotte returns home to find yet another letter in the house. She considers various plans to address the situation but, ultimately she decides to wait in the library to watch Kenneth open the letter. As she watches him read, then kiss the letter, she cries out, "Kenneth!" assuming that he is having an affair. He insists the letter isn’t from a lover, but rather a female business correspondent. Charlotte proposes a romantic getaway for her and Kenneth, to repair their marriage and escape from the letters, but Kenneth feels too exhausted and urges her that he can’t go on vacation right now. This feeds into Charlotte’s insecurity about their relationship and heightens the importance of those letters. Charlotte questions if the writer of the letters is the reason he cannot travel. After the confrontation, Kenneth agrees to go wherever Charlotte pleases.

The next morning Charlotte wakes up late, and the governess tells her that Kenneth has left for work, and instructs her to start packing for their trip, which will take place tomorrow. Charlotte realizes she doesn’t know what to pack, so she calls the secretary of Kenneth’s office. She learns that Kenneth is out of town, presumably to meet the letter writer. Charlotte feels hopeless, and turns to Kenneth’s mother, Mrs. Ashby, for support to find Kenneth. After the two women dine at Mrs. Ashby’s home, they go back to Kenneth’s home to await his arrival. To Charlotte’s surprise, a letter is on the hall table, which is the ninth letter. At first, Mrs. Ashby attempts to stop Charlotte from opening the letter and invading Kenneth’s privacy. However, after seeing the envelope, Mrs. Ashby then encourages Charlotte to open the letter. They have a hard time deciphering its contents. Mrs. Ashby looks at the wall where Elsie’s picture used to hang, which suggests the writing is connected to Elsie's ghost. This hints at a deeper bond between Kenneth and his first wife, and reveals the connection between them beyond the grave. The two women stand together in shock. Mrs. Ashby reassures Charlotte that Kenneth will explain everything when he returns, but the only thing left to do now is to call the police.

== Setting ==
This story is set in March, within the bustling city of New York. It takes place primarily within the Ashby home, which is a stark contrast to the lively city surrounding it. Charlotte Ashby is hesitant to step foot into her calm and bland home at the start of the story, because it makes her feel trapped. A home that was once a private sanctuary for Charlotte is now characterized by tension and isolation. The Ashby home is characterized by decorations and style from the late Mrs. Ashby, and the family struggles both emotionally and financially to make renovations. Charlotte strives to add her own personal touches to the home, particularly within the drawing room. The setting exemplifies the attempt to begin a new, fresh chapter of life, while the past continues to hold the inhabitants back. Part of the story takes place in the nearby home of the elder Mrs. Ashby, Kenneth’s mother, where Charlotte visits in search of Kenneth. This story is the only ghost story of Wharton’s that takes place in an urban setting.

== Characters ==
Charlotte Gorse Ashby: Second wife of Kenneth Ashby. They have been married for one year. Charlotte experiences paranoia and anxiety in regards to the cryptic letters that Kenneth receives. She is a “sophisticated woman,” and “knew that there were often old entanglements” between former spouses. Charlotte’s stepchildren take a liking to her, due to her “good humour and the children’s obvious fondness for her.” She desires to know everything about Kenneth and to be as close to him as possible. She finds herself torn on whether to invade her husband’s private, personal business, in order to seek the answers she craves and regain control over their marriage.

Kenneth Ashby: A New York lawyer who was previously married to Elise Ashby who died, now currently married to Charlotte Ashby. Kenneth is currently being haunted by his ex wife Elsie and is receiving random letters from her. Kenneth tries to keep these letters a secret from Charlotte, but appears as suspicious as if he may be cheating on her. Kenneth tries to be faithful to both his deceased wife and his current one which suggests a model of marital fidelity. His professional work is what ultimately spares him from suicide, as a result of his heartbreak over Elsie’s death.

Elsie Corder Ashby (deceased): First wife of Kenneth Ashby. Elsie is deceased and her ghost haunts Kenneth and Charlotte in their house. Elsie is the one responsible for randomly sending Kenneth letters throughout the story, and is the one responsible for putting a wedge in between Charlotte and Kenneth’s marriage. Even as a ghost, Elsie is still in control of Kenneth.

Peter and Joyce: Children of Kenneth and late Elsie Ashby. They grow accustomed to their stepmom, Charlotte, and enjoy the humor and nurturing that she provides. They spend their days in the nursery upstairs with their governess, and have little presence in the rest of the house with Charlotte and Kenneth. This speaks to the unique parenting styles of the time period.

Old Mrs. Ashby (Kenneth’s mother): Has a “fearless tongue,” and is known for spoiling her grandchildren. Her and Charlotte have a strong, positive relationship. She is fond of Charlotte, and remarks that it is better that Elsie is gone. She serves as a peaceful, calming influence and companion for Charlotte.

Governess: Often fulfills many of the parental roles in raising and caring for Peter and Joyce. She serves as caretaker and messenger for the children and adults in the household. She and the children spend the majority of their time upstairs in the nursery.

== Major themes ==
=== Ambiguity vs. concrete answers ===
Many elements of the story reflect an ambiguous and vague style. This includes Elsie’s letters, because of their barely visible handwriting, and their contents which are never revealed. In addition, Charlotte cannot receive concrete answers from Kenneth regarding who is sending the letters, and why they bother him so much. This ambiguity is what drives a wedge between Charlotte and Kenneth. It also causes Charlotte to experience mistrust and anxiety. The ending of the story is ambiguous as well. It is never revealed what happens to Kenneth, or what Charlotte and Mrs. Ashby do, once they realize who wrote the letters. Wharton adopts an ambiguous writing style within the entire text, and several of her other works as well. This ambiguous style mirrors modern marriage and female authorship. Both of these concepts are associated with a fear of displaying excess information, and a tendency and comfort in remaining vague.

=== Supernatural (hauntology) ===
Through the ghost of Elsie Corder Ashby, who sends Kenneth Ashby unexplained letters, we see how hauntology affects the relationship between Kenneth and his current wife Charlotte Ashby.

== Title relevance ==
There is speculation amongst critics and literary scholars about the significance and relevance of the title of Wharton’s work, because there is no direct reference to pomegranate seeds in the short story. However, critics have analyzed a potential parallel that exists between Wharton’s work and Greek mythology, particularly the myth of Persephone and Demeter. In the Greek myth, Persephone eats pomegranate seeds, and she is forced to live between earth and the underworld as a result.

In Wharton's short story, it remains unclear and is still debated as to “Who eats the seed? Is Charlotte or Kenneth the Persephone figure?” This uncertainty is due to the lack of clarity that Charlotte and Kenneth experience throughout the story with their marriage and the letters. Also, they both have a connection to the underworld through Elsie, with Charlotte as the replacement, and Kenneth as the first husband and father to Elsie’s children.

== Bibliography ==
Hanson, J. (2021). Edith Wharton’s Hauntology. The Baffler. https://thebaffler.com/latest/edith-whartons-hauntology-hanson

Johnson, R. (2018). Pomegranate Seed - A Tutorial, Study Guide & Commentary. Mantex. https://mantex.co.uk/pomegranate-seed/

Latham, R., Haigney, S., Kaufman, P. B., Benjamin, R., Bodrojan, S., & Magloire, M. (2022). The Ghosts of Patriarchy. Los Angeles Review of Books. https://lareviewofbooks.org/article/the-ghosts-of-patriarchy/

Rossetti, G. (2012). Old Entanglements: Spectral Spouses in Edith Wharton’s “The Other Two” and “Pomegranate Seed.” Journal of the Short Story in English, 58, 189-200. http://journals.openedition.org/jsse/1254

Signley, C.J., & Sweeney, S.E. (1991). Forbidden Reading and Ghostly Writing: Anxious Power in Wharton’s “Pomegranate Seed.” Women’s Studies, 20(2), 177–203. https://doi.org/10.1080/00497878.1991.9978902

Young, J. (1996). The Repudiation of Sisterhood in Edith Wharton’s “Pomegranate Seed.” Studies in Short Fiction, 33(1) https://link.gale.com/apps/doc/A19638472/LitRC?u=anon~4290ff39&sid=googleScholar&xid=ce647470
