= Edith Wharton =

American writer and designer (1862–1937)

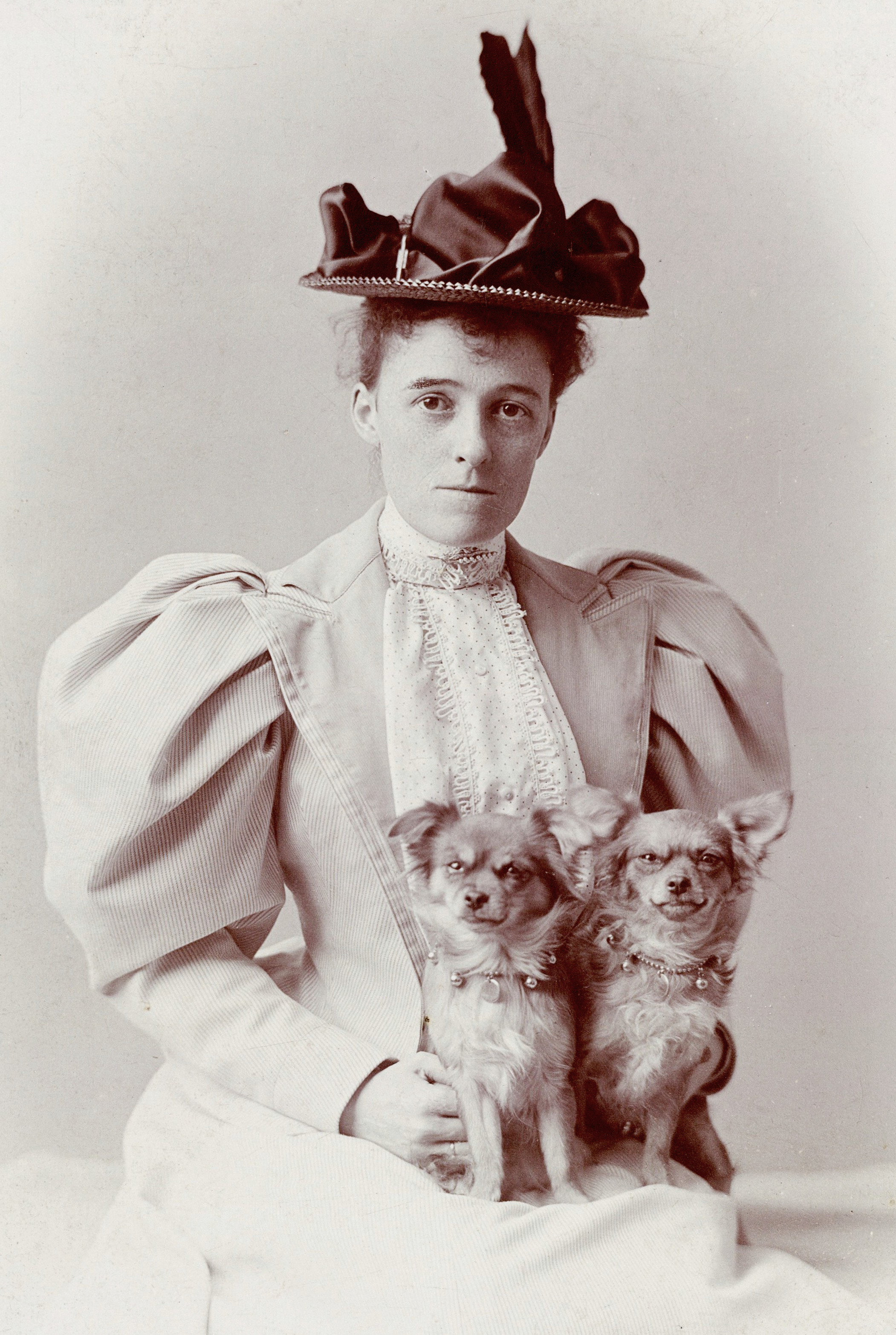
- Wharton, c. 1895
- Born: Edith Newbold Jones; January 24, 1862; Manhattan, New York City, U.S.
- Died: August 11, 1937 (aged 75); Saint-Brice-sous-Forêt, France
- Resting place: Cimetière des Gonards
- Occupations: Novelist; short story writer; designer
- Spouse: Edward Wharton (m. 1885; div. 1913)
- Relatives: Ebenezer Stevens (maternal great-grandfather); John Austin Stevens (great-uncle); Alexander Stevens (great-uncle); Frederic W. Rhinelander (uncle); Samuel Stevens Sands (cousin); Caroline Schermerhorn Astor (cousin); Frederic Rhinelander King (cousin); Byam K. Stevens (cousin); Frederic W. Stevens (cousin); Alexander Henry Stevens (cousin); Thomas Newbold (cousin); Eugenie Mary Ladenburg Davie (cousin); Mary Cadwalader Rawle Jones (sister-in-law)
- Writing career
- Notable awards: Pulitzer Prize for Fiction; 1921 The Age of Innocence

Edith Newbold Wharton (/ˈhwɔːrtən/; née Jones; January 24, 1862 – August 11, 1937) was an American writer and designer. Wharton drew upon her insider's knowledge of upper-class New York society to portray, realistically, the lives and morals of the Gilded Age. In 1921, she became the first woman to win the Pulitzer Prize for Fiction for her novel The Age of Innocence. She was inducted into the National Women's Hall of Fame in 1996. Her other well-known works are The House of Mirth, the novella Ethan Frome, and several notable ghost stories.

== Biography ==
=== Early life ===
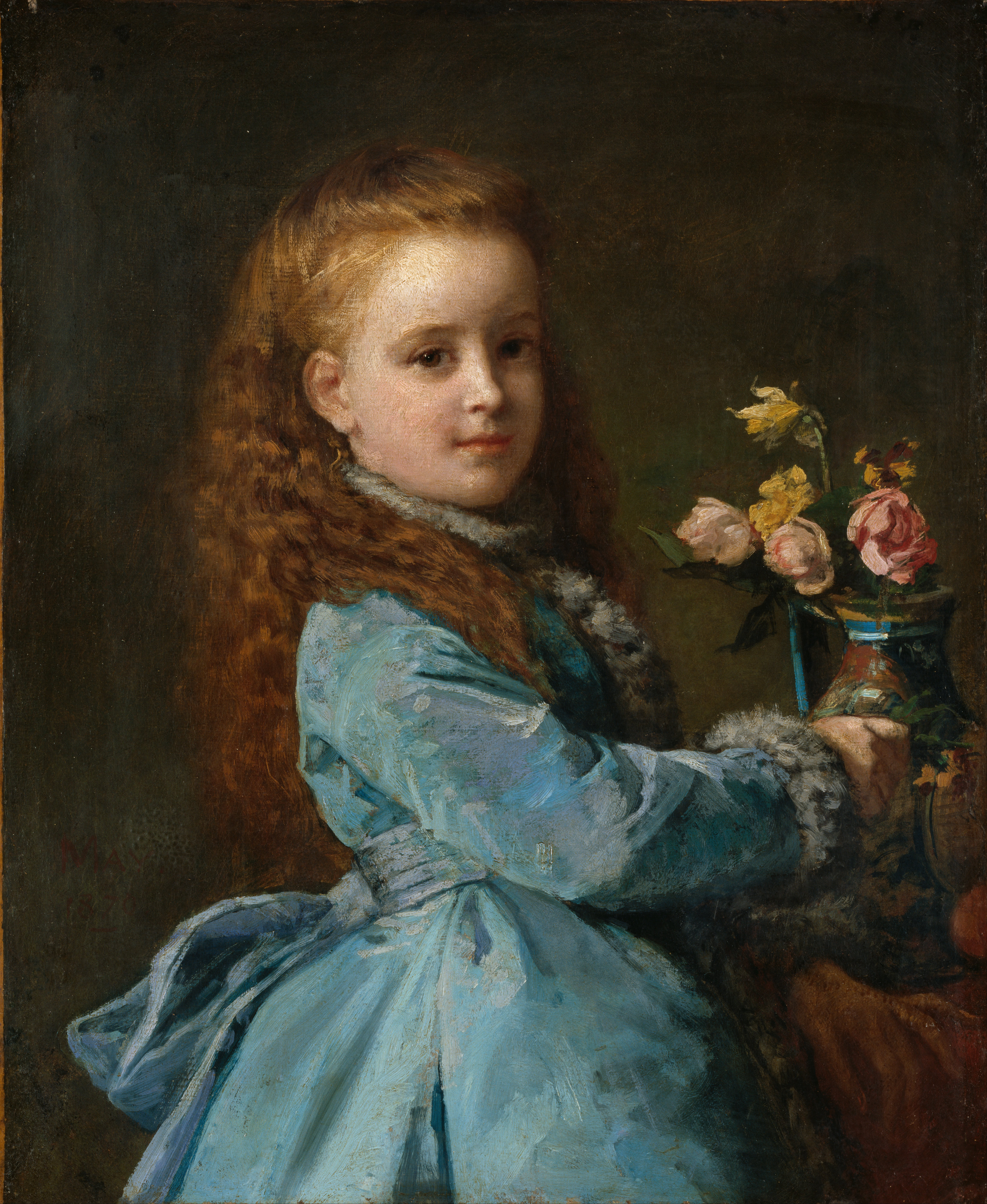
Portrait of Wharton as a child by Edward Harrison May (1870)

Edith Newbold Jones was born on January 24, 1862, to George Frederic Jones and Lucretia Stevens Rhinelander, at their brownstone at 14 West 23rd Street in Manhattan, New York City. To her friends and family, she was known as "Pussy Jones". She had two elder brothers, Frederic Rhinelander and Henry Edward. Frederic married Mary Cadwalader Rawle; their daughter was landscape architect Beatrix Farrand. Edith was baptized April 20, 1862, Easter Sunday, at Grace Church.

Wharton's paternal family, the Joneses, were a very wealthy and socially prominent family, having made their money in real estate. The saying "keeping up with the Joneses" is said to refer to her father's family. She was related to the Rensselaers, the most prestigious of the old patroon families, who had received land grants from the former Dutch government of New York and New Jersey. Her father's first cousin was Caroline Schermerhorn Astor. Fort Stevens, in New York, was named for Wharton's maternal great-grandfather, Ebenezer Stevens, a Revolutionary War hero and general.

Wharton was born during the Civil War. However, in describing her family life, Wharton does not mention the war, except that their travels to Europe after the war were due to the depreciation of American currency. From 1866 to 1872, the Jones family visited France, Italy, Germany, and Spain. During her travels, the young Edith became fluent in French, German, and Italian. At the age of nine, she suffered from typhoid fever, which nearly killed her, while the family was at a spa in the Black Forest. After the family returned to the United States in 1872, they spent their winters in New York City and their summers in Newport, Rhode Island. While in Europe, she was educated by tutors and governesses. She rejected the standards of fashion and etiquette that were expected of young girls at the time, which were intended to allow women to marry well and to be put on display at balls and parties. She considered these fashions superficial and oppressive. Edith wanted more education than she received, so she read from her father's library and from the libraries of her father's friends. Her mother forbade her to read "novels" until she was married, and Edith obeyed this command.

=== Early writing ===
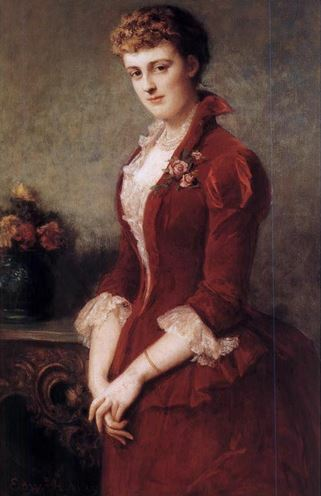
Edith Wharton by Edward Harrison May (1881)

Wharton wrote and told stories from an early age. When her family moved to Europe and she was just four or five, she started what she called "making up." She invented stories for her family and walked with an open book, turning the pages as if reading while improvising a story. Wharton began writing poetry and fiction as a young girl, and she attempted to write her first novel at the age of 11. Her mother's criticism quashed her ambition, however, and she turned to poetry. She was 15 years old when her first published work appeared, a translation of a German poem "Was die Steine Erzählen" ("What the Stones Tell") by Heinrich Karl Brugsch, for which she was paid $50. Her family did not want her name to appear in print, since writing was not considered a proper occupation for a society woman of her time. Consequently, the poem was published under the name of a friend's father, E. A. Washburn, a cousin of Ralph Waldo Emerson, who supported women's education. In 1877, at the age of 15, she secretly wrote a novella, Fast and Loose. In 1878, her father arranged for a collection of two dozen original poems and five translations, Verses, to be privately published. Wharton published a poem under a pseudonym in the New York World, in 1879. In 1880, she had five poems published anonymously in the Atlantic Monthly, an important literary magazine. Despite these early successes, she was not encouraged by her family or her social circle, and though she continued to write, she did not publish anything more until her poem "The Last Giustiniani" was published in Scribner's Magazine in October 1889.

=== The "debutante" years ===
Between 1880 and 1890, Wharton put her writing aside to participate in the social rituals of the New York upper classes. She keenly observed the social changes happening around her, which she later used in her writing. Wharton officially came out as a debutante to society in 1879. She was allowed to bare her shoulders and wear her hair up for the first time at a December dance, which was given by a Society matron, Anna Morton. Wharton began a courtship with Henry Leyden Stevens, the son of Paran Stevens, a wealthy hotelier and real estate investor from rural New Hampshire. His sister, Minnie, married Arthur Paget. The Jones family did not approve of Stevens.

In the middle of her debutante season, the Jones family returned to Europe in 1881 for her father's health. Still, her father, George Frederic Jones, died of a stroke in Cannes in 1882. Stevens was with the Jones family in Europe during this time. After returning to the United States with her mother, Wharton continued her courtship with Stevens, announcing their engagement in August 1882. The month the two were to marry, the engagement ended.

Wharton's mother, Lucretia Stevens Rhinelander Jones, moved back to Paris in 1883, and she lived there until her death in 1901.

=== 1880s–1900s ===
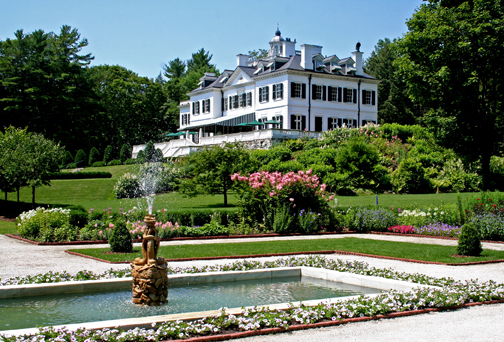
The Mount, 2006

On April 29, 1885, at the age of 23, Wharton married Edward Robbins (Teddy) Wharton, who was 12 years her senior, at the Trinity Chapel Complex in Manhattan. From a well-established Boston family, he was a sportsman and a gentleman of the same social class and shared her love of travel. The Whartons set up house at Pencraig Cottage in Newport, Rhode Island. In 1893, they bought a house named Land's End, on the other side of Newport, for $80,000, and moved into it. Wharton decorated Land's End, with the help of designer Ogden Codman. In 1897, the Whartons purchased their New York home, 884 Park Avenue. Between 1886 and 1897, they traveled overseas, in the period from February to June, mostly visiting Italy but also Paris and England. From her marriage onwards, three interests came to dominate Wharton's life: American houses, writing, and Italy.

From the late 1880s until 1902, Teddy Wharton suffered from chronic depression, and due to this the couple ceased their extensive travel. At that time, his depression became more debilitating, after which they lived almost exclusively at their estate, The Mount, in Lenox, Massachusetts. During those same years, Wharton, herself, was said to suffer from asthma and periods of depression.

In 1908, Teddy Wharton's mental condition was determined to be incurable. In that year, Wharton began an affair with Morton Fullerton, an author, and foreign correspondent for The Times of London, in whom she found an intellectual partner. She divorced Edward Wharton, in 1913, after 28 years of marriage. Around the same time, she was beset with harsh literary criticism from the naturalist school of writers.

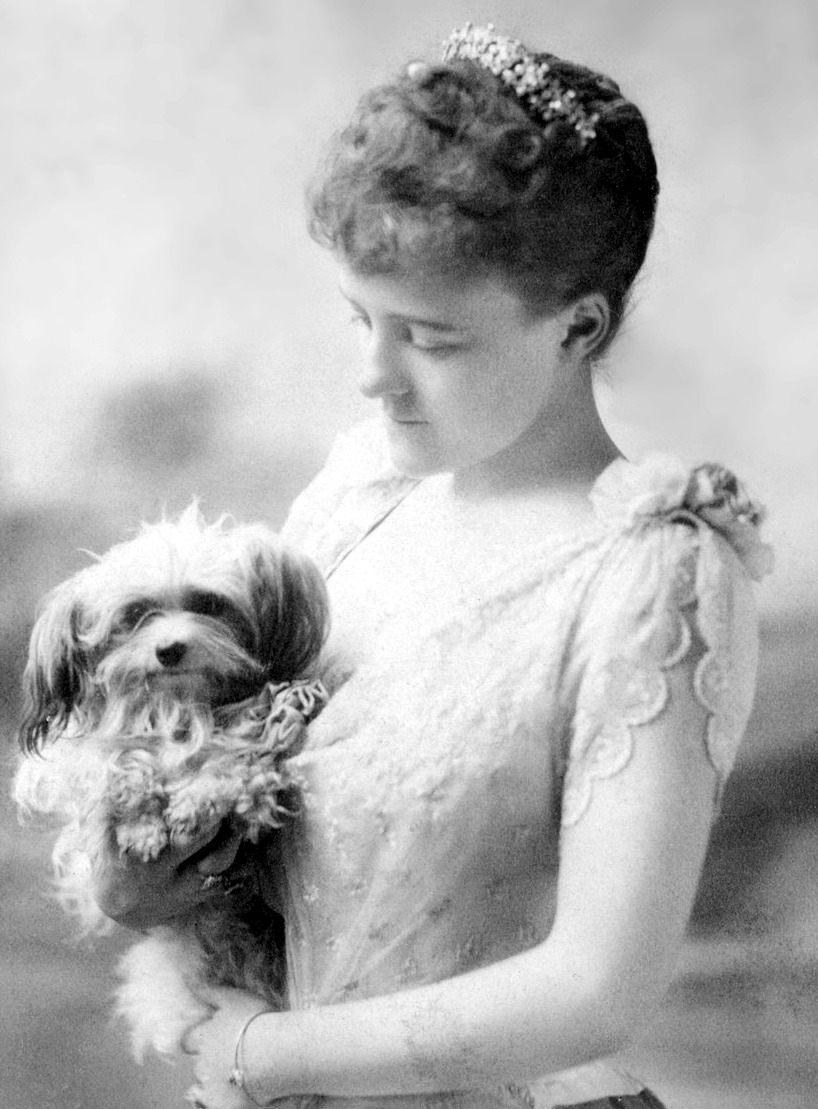
Edith Wharton c. 1889

In addition to novels, Wharton wrote at least 85 short stories. She was also a garden designer, an interior designer, and a taste-maker of her time. She wrote several design books, including her first major published work, The Decoration of Houses (1897), co-authored by Ogden Codman. Another of her "home and garden" books is the generously illustrated Italian Villas and Their Gardens of 1904, illustrated by Maxfield Parrish.

=== Travels and life abroad ===
Over the course of her life, she crossed the Atlantic 60 times. In Europe, her primary destinations were Italy, France, and England. She also went to Morocco. She wrote many books about her travels, including Italian Backgrounds and A Motor-Flight through France.

Her husband, Edward Wharton, shared her love of travel and for many years, they spent at least four months of each year abroad, mainly in Italy. Their friend, Egerton Winthrop, accompanied them on many journeys there. In 1888, the Whartons and their friend, James Van Alen, took a cruise through the Aegean islands. Wharton was 26. The trip cost the Whartons $10,000 and lasted four months. She kept a travel journal during this trip that was thought to be lost, but was later published as The Cruise of the Vanadis, now considered her earliest known travel writing.

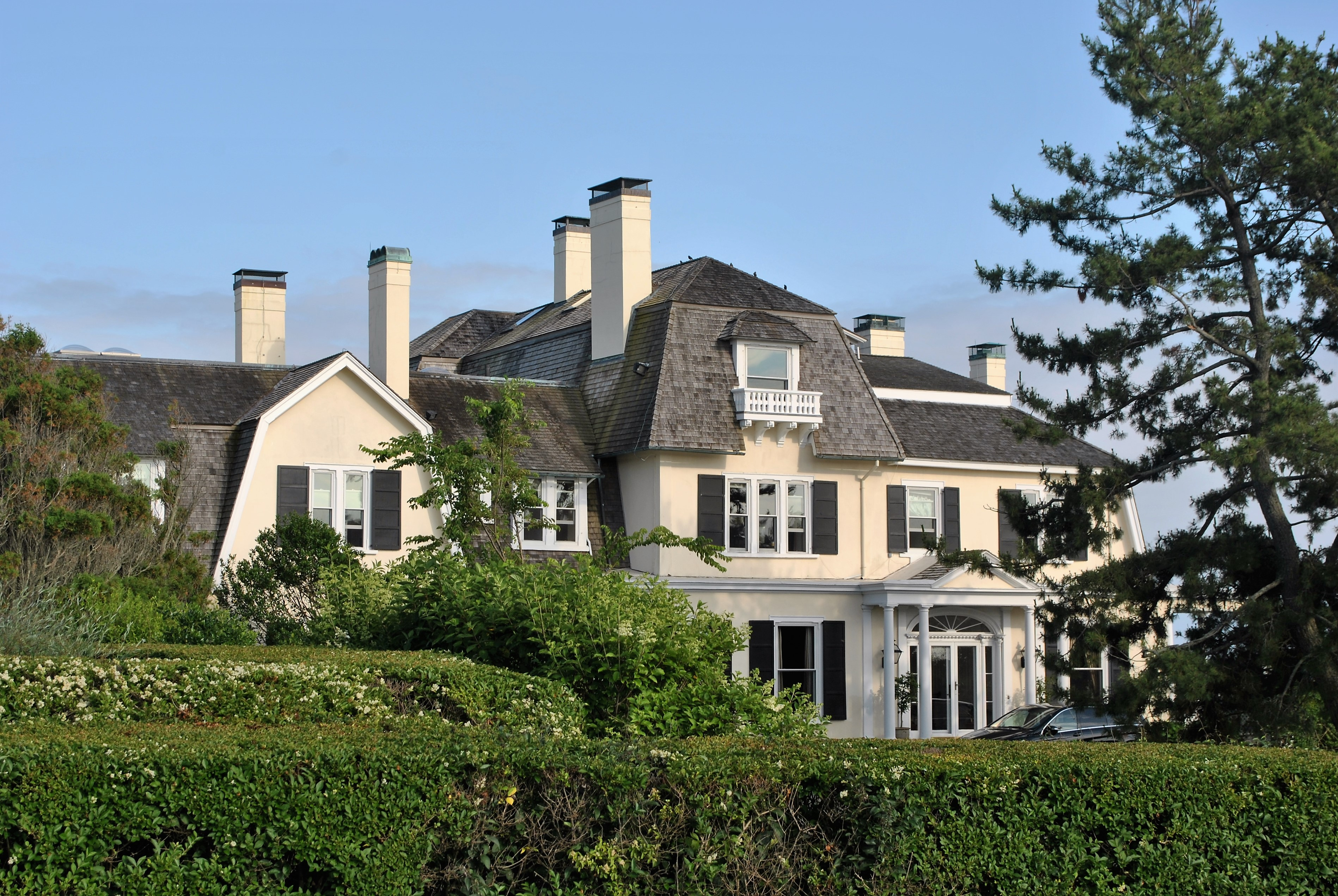
Land's End, Newport, Rhode Island

In 1897, Edith Wharton purchased Land's End in Newport, Rhode Island, from Robert Livingston Beeckman, a former U.S. Open Tennis Championship runner-up who became governor of Rhode Island. At the time, Wharton described the main house as "incurably ugly." Wharton agreed to pay $80,000 for the property, and she spent thousands more to alter the home's facade, decorate the interior, and landscape the grounds.

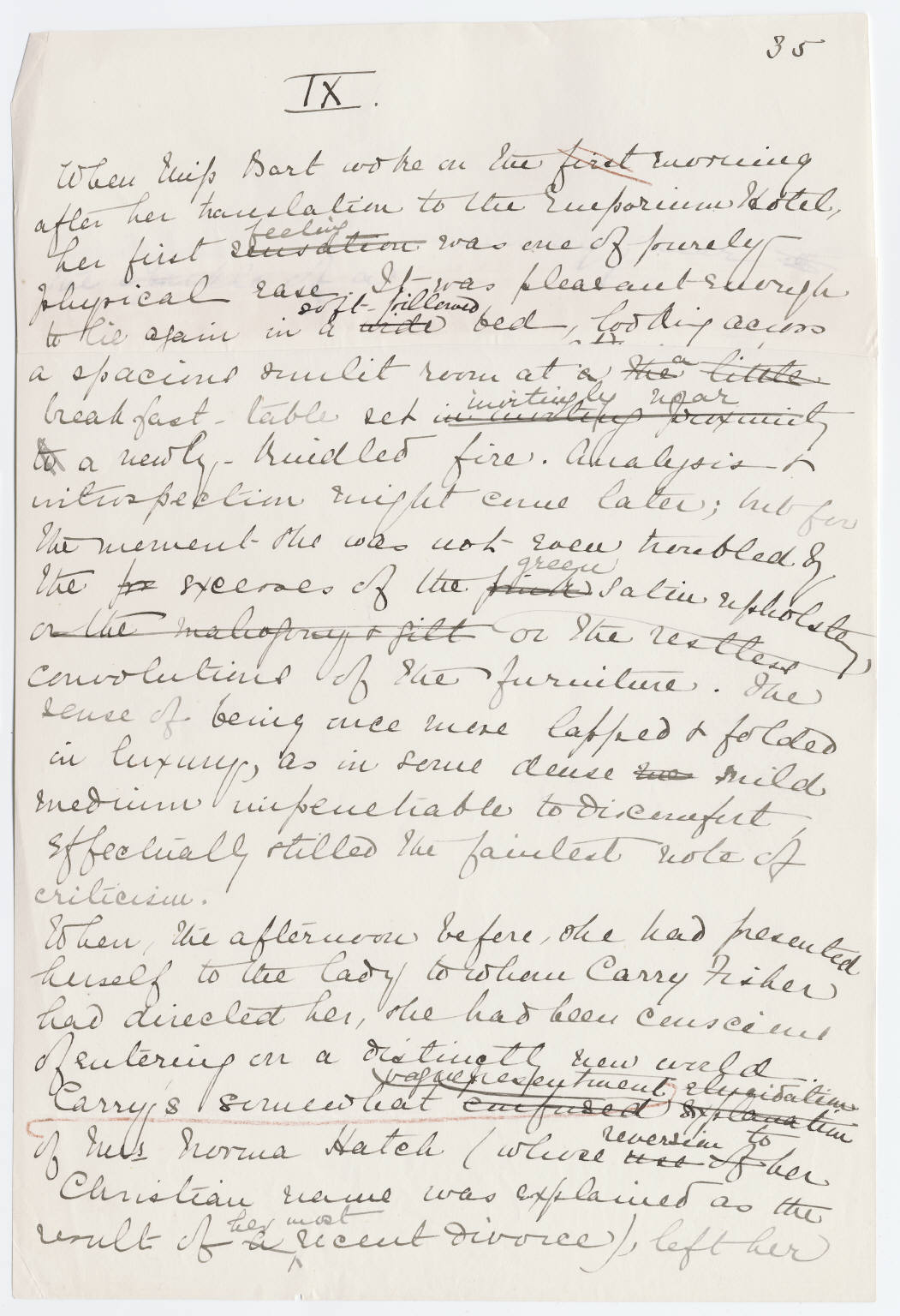
Page from original manuscript of The House of Mirth, in Edith Wharton's hand

In 1902, Wharton designed The Mount, her estate in Lenox, Massachusetts, which survives, today, as an example of her design principles. While living there, she wrote The House of Mirth (1905), her best-known chronicle of life in old New York, The Fruit of the Tree (1907), and other fiction. She also gathered material for many of her other works, including Ethan Frome (1911) and Summer (1917). At The Mount, she entertained the cream of American literary society, including her close friend, novelist Henry James, who described the estate as "a delicate French chateau mirrored in a Massachusetts pond". Although she spent many months traveling in Europe nearly every year with her friend Egerton Winthrop (a descendant of John Winthrop), The Mount was her primary residence until 1911. When living there and while traveling abroad, Wharton was usually driven to appointments by her longtime chauffeur and friend Charles Cook, a native of nearby South Lee, Massachusetts. When her marriage deteriorated, she decided to move permanently to France, living first at 53 Rue de Varenne, Paris, in an apartment that belonged to George Washington Vanderbilt II.

Wharton was preparing to vacation for the summer when World War I broke out. Though many fled Paris, she moved back to her Paris apartment on the Rue de Varenne and for four years was a tireless and ardent supporter of the French war effort. One of the first causes she undertook, in August 1914, was the opening of a workroom for unemployed women. Here, they were fed and paid one franc a day. What began with 30 women soon doubled to 60 women and their sewing business began to thrive. When the Germans invaded Belgium in the fall of 1914 and Paris was flooded with Belgian refugees, she helped to set up the American Hostels for Refugees, which managed to get them shelter, meals, and clothes, and eventually created an employment agency to help them find work. She collected more than $100,000 on their behalf. In early 1915, she organized the Children of Flanders Rescue Committee, which gave shelter to nearly 900 Belgian refugees who had fled when their homes were bombed by the Germans.

Aided by her influential connections in the French government, she and her long-time friend Walter Berry (then president of the American Chamber of Commerce in Paris) were among the few foreigners in France allowed to travel to the front lines during World War I. She and Berry made five journeys between February and August 1915, which Wharton described in a series of articles that were first published in Scribner's Magazine and later as Fighting France: From Dunkerque to Belfort, which became an American bestseller. Travelling by car, Wharton and Berry drove through the war zone, viewing one devastated French village after another. She visited the trenches and was within earshot of artillery fire. She wrote, "We woke to a noise of guns closer and more incessant, and when we went out into the streets, it seemed as if, overnight, a new army had sprung out of the ground".

Throughout the war, she worked in charitable efforts for refugees, the injured, the unemployed, and the displaced. In the words of her biographer Hermione Lee, she was a "heroic worker on behalf of her adopted country". On April 18, 1916, Raymond Poincaré, then-President of France, appointed her Chevalier of the Legion of Honour, the fifth class of the country's highest honour, in recognition of her dedication to the war effort. Her relief work included setting up workrooms for unemployed French women, organizing concerts to provide work for musicians, raising tens of thousands of dollars for the war effort, and opening tuberculosis hospitals. In 1915, Wharton edited a charity benefit volume, The Book of the Homeless, which included essays, art, poetry, and musical scores by many major contemporary European and American artists, including Henry James, Joseph Conrad, William Dean Howells, Anna de Noailles, Jean Cocteau, and Walter Gay, among others. Wharton proposed the book to her publisher, Scribner's, handled the business arrangements, lined up contributors, and translated the French entries into English. Theodore Roosevelt wrote a two-page introduction, in which he praised Wharton's effort and urged Americans to support the war. She also kept up her own work, continuing to write novels, short stories, and poems, as well as reporting for The New York Times and keeping up her enormous correspondence. Wharton urged Americans to support the war effort and encouraged America to enter the war. She wrote the popular romantic novel, Summer, in 1917; the war novella, The Marne, in 1918; and A Son at the Front, in 1919 (published 1923). An incomplete short story,“The Men Who Saved the World,” believed to have been written no earlier than July 1918, was published for the first time in The Strand Magazine in 2026, after having been discovered among her papers in Beinecke Rare Book & Manuscript Library at Yale University. When the war ended, she watched the Victory Parade from the Champs Elysees' balcony of a friend's apartment. After four years of intense effort, she decided to leave Paris for the quiet of the countryside. Wharton settled 10 mi (16 km) north of Paris in Saint-Brice-sous-Forêt, buying an 18th-century house on seven acres of land that she called Pavillon Colombe. She lived there, in summer and autumn, for the rest of her life, spending winters and springs on the French Riviera at Sainte Claire du Vieux Chateau in Hyères.

Wharton was a committed supporter of French imperialism, describing herself as a "rabid imperialist", and the war solidified her political views. After the war, she traveled to Morocco, as the guest of Resident General Hubert Lyautey and wrote the book In Morocco, full of praise for the French administration, Lyautey, and particularly, his wife.

During the post-war years, she divided her time between Hyères and Provence, where she finished The Age of Innocence, in 1920. She returned to the United States only once, after the war, to receive an honorary doctorate from Yale University in 1923.

=== Later years ===
The Age of Innocence (1920) won the 1921 Pulitzer Prize for Fiction, making Wharton the first woman to win the award. The three fiction judges – literary critic Stuart Pratt Sherman, literature professor Robert Morss Lovett, and novelist Hamlin Garland – voted to give the prize to Sinclair Lewis for his satire Main Street, but Columbia University's advisory board, led by conservative university president Nicholas Murray Butler, overturned their decision and awarded the prize to The Age of Innocence. Wharton was also nominated for the Nobel Prize in Literature in 1927, 1928, and 1930.

Wharton was friend and confidante to many prominent intellectuals of her time: Henry James, Sinclair Lewis, Jean Cocteau, and André Gide were all her guests, at one time or another. Theodore Roosevelt, Bernard Berenson, and Kenneth Clark were valued friends, as well. Through her friendship with Clark she became the godmother of his son, Colin. Particularly notable was her meeting with F. Scott Fitzgerald, described by the editors of her letters as "one of the better known failed encounters in the American literary annals." She spoke fluent French, Italian, and German, and many of her books were published in both French and English.

In 1934, Wharton's autobiography, A Backward Glance, was published. In the view of Judith E. Funston, writing on Edith Wharton in American National Biography,

What is most notable about A Backward Glance, however, is what it does not tell: her criticism of Lucretia Jones [her mother], her difficulties with Teddy, and her affair with Morton Fullerton, which did not come to light until her papers, deposited in Yale's Beinecke Rare Book Room and Manuscript Library, were opened in 1968.

=== Death ===
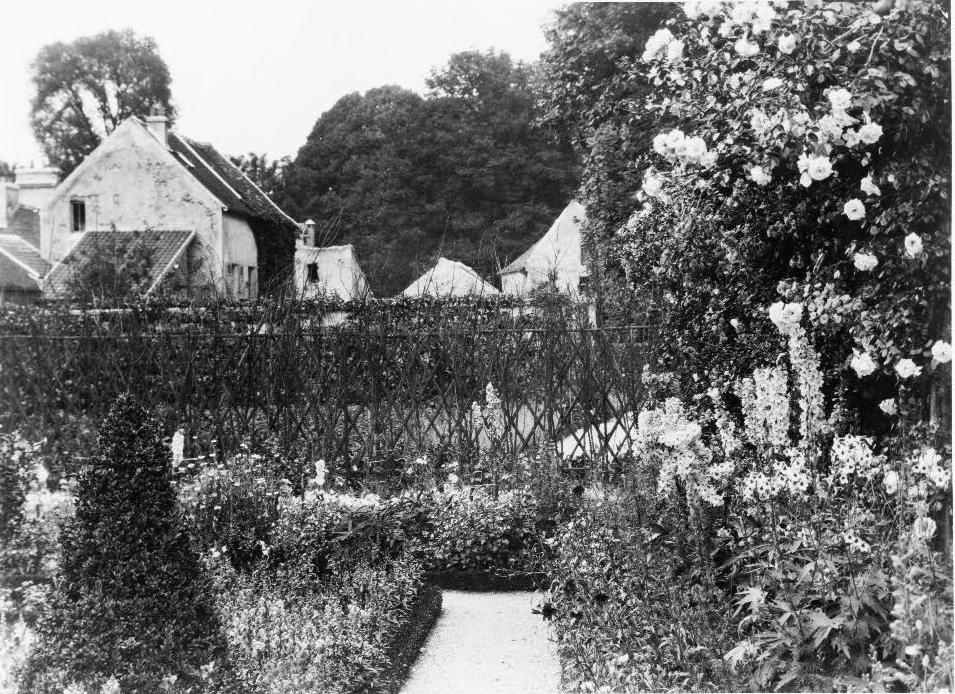
Wharton's Le Pavillon Colombe, Saint-Brice-sous-Forêt, France

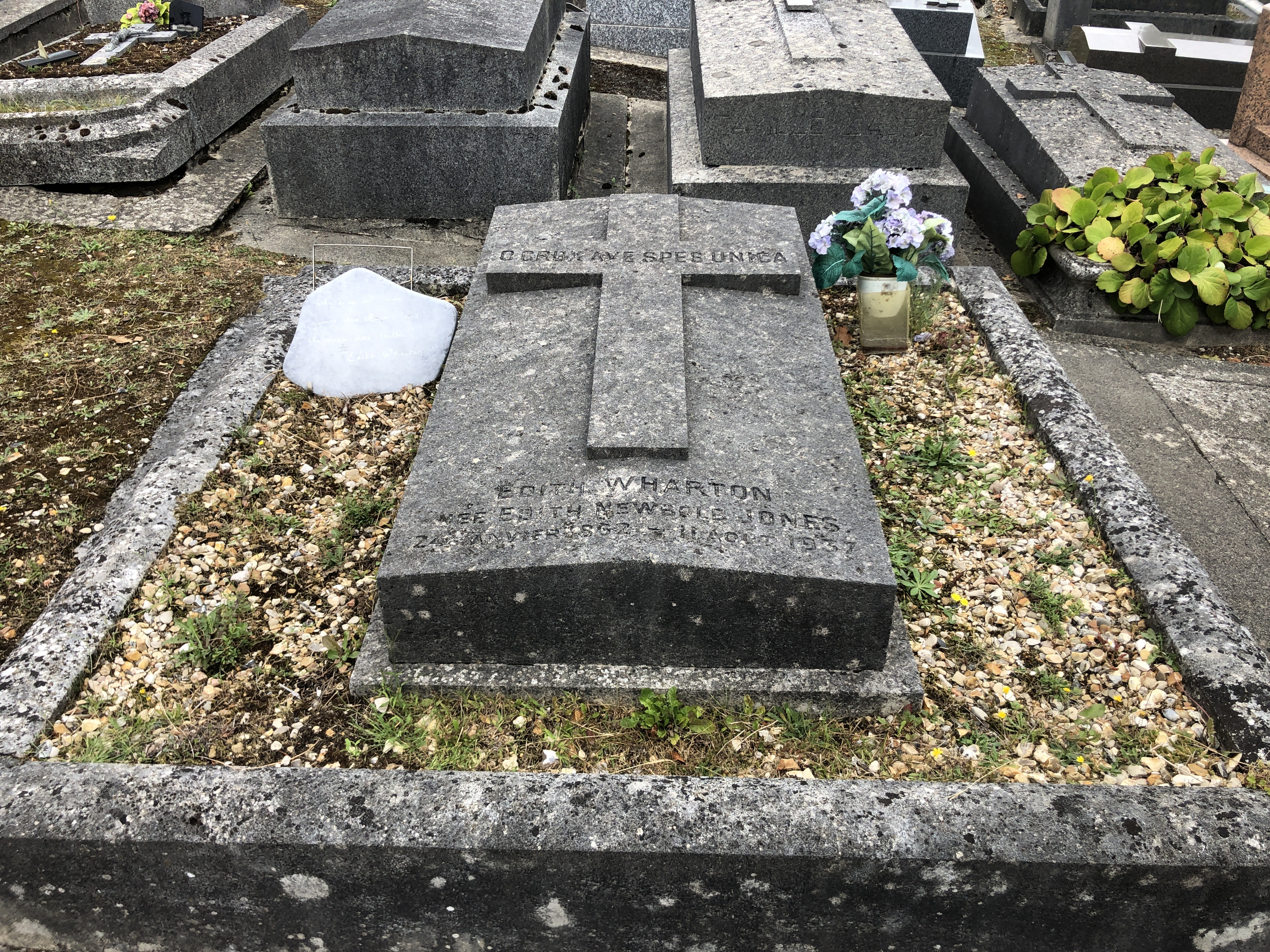
Grave of Edith Wharton

On June 1, 1937, Wharton was at her French country home (shared with architect and interior decorator Ogden Codman), where she was at work on a revised edition of The Decoration of Houses, when she suffered a heart attack and collapsed.

She died of a stroke on August 11, 1937, at Le Pavillon Colombe, her 18th-century house on Rue de Montmorency in Saint-Brice-sous-Forêt. She died at 5:30 p.m., but her death was not known in Paris. At her bedside was her friend, Mrs. Royall Tyler. Wharton was buried in the American Protestant section of the Cimetière des Gonards in Versailles, "with all the honors owed a war hero and a chevalier of the Legion of Honor ... a group of some one hundred friends sang a verse of the hymn 'O Paradise'..."

== Writing ==
=== Career ===
Despite not publishing her first novel until she was forty, Wharton became an extraordinarily productive writer. In addition to her 15 novels, seven novellas, and eighty-five short stories, she published poetry, books on design, travel, literary and cultural criticism, and a memoir.

In 1873, Wharton wrote a short story and gave it to her mother to read. Stinging from her mother's critique, Wharton decided to write only poetry. While she constantly sought her mother's approval and love, she rarely received either, and their relationship was a troubled one. Before she was 15, Wharton wrote Fast and Loose (1877). In her youth, she wrote about society. Her central themes came from her experiences with her parents. She was very critical of her work and wrote public reviews criticizing it. She also wrote about her own experiences with life. "Intense Love's Utterance" is a poem written about Henry Stevens.

In 1889, she sent out three poems for publication, to Scribner's, Harper's and Century. Edward L. Burlingame published "The Last Giustiniani" for Scribner's. It was not until Wharton was 29 that her first short story was published: "Mrs. Manstey's View" had very little success, and it took her more than a year to publish another story. She completed "The Fullness of Life", following her annual European trip with Teddy. Burlingame was critical of this story, but Wharton did not want to make edits to it. This story, along with many others, speaks about her marriage. She sent Bunner Sisters to Scribner's, in 1892. Burlingame wrote back that it was too long for Scribner's to publish. This story is believed to be based on an experience she had as a child. It did not see publication until 1916, and it is included in the collection called Xingu. After a visit with her friend, Paul Bourget, she wrote "The Good May Come" and "The Lamp of Psyche". "The Lamp of Psyche" was a comical story, with verbal wit and sorrow. After "Something Exquisite" was rejected by Burlingame, she lost confidence in herself. She started travel writing, in 1894.

In 1901, Wharton wrote a two-act play called Man of Genius. This play was about an English man who was having an affair with his secretary. The play was rehearsed but was never produced. Another 1901 play, The Shadow of a Doubt, which also came close to being staged but fell through, was thought to be lost, until it was discovered in 2017. It had a radio adaptation broadcast on BBC Radio 3 in 2018. It would not be until 2023, over a century later, that the world stage premiere took place in Canada at the Shaw Festival, directed by Peter Hinton-Davis.

She collaborated with Marie Tempest to write another play, but the two only completed four acts, before Marie decided she was no longer interested in costume plays. One of her earliest literary endeavors (1902) was the translation of the play Es Lebe das Leben ("The Joy of Living"), by Hermann Sudermann. The Joy of Living was criticized for its title, because the heroine swallows poison, at the end, and was a short-lived Broadway production. It was, however, a successful book.

Many of Wharton's novels are characterized by subtle use of dramatic irony. Having grown up in upper-class, late-19th-century society, Wharton became one of its most astute critics, in such works as The House of Mirth and The Age of Innocence. Harold Bloom points out how the latter novel "centers upon an idea of order, a convention that stifles passion and yet liberates from chaos."

=== Themes ===
Versions of her mother, Lucretia Jones, often appeared in Wharton's fiction. Biographer Hermione Lee described it as "one of the most lethal acts of revenge ever taken by a writing daughter." In her memoir, A Backward Glance, Wharton describes her mother as indolent, spendthrift, censorious, disapproving, superficial, icy, dry and ironic.

Wharton's writings often dealt with what Almasa Mulalic calls themes such as "social and individual fulfillment, repressed sexuality, and the manners of old families and the new elite." Maureen Howard, editor of Edith Wharton: Collected Stories, notes several recurring themes in Wharton's short stories, including confinement and attempts at freedom, the morality of the author, critiques of intellectual pretension, and the "unmasking" of the truth. Mulalic adds that Wharton's writing also explored themes of "social mores and social reform" as they relate to the "extremes and anxieties of the Gilded Age".

A key recurring theme in Wharton's writing is the relationship between the house as a physical space and its relationship to its inhabitant's characteristics and emotions. Maureen Howard argues that "Edith Wharton conceived of houses, dwelling places, in extended imagery of shelter and dispossession. Houses – their confinement and their theatrical possibilities ... they are never mere settings."

=== Influences ===
American children's stories containing slang were forbidden in Wharton's childhood home. This prohibition included such popular authors as Mark Twain, Bret Harte, and Joel Chandler Harris. She was allowed to read Louisa May Alcott, but Wharton preferred Lewis Carroll's Alice's Adventures in Wonderland and Charles Kingsley's The Water-Babies, A Fairy Tale for a Land Baby. Wharton's mother forbade her to read many novels, and Wharton said she "read everything else but novels until the day of my marriage." Instead Wharton read the classics, philosophy, history, and poetry in her father's library including Daniel Defoe, John Milton, Thomas Carlyle, Alphonse de Lamartine, Victor Hugo, Jean Racine, Thomas Moore, Lord Byron, William Wordsworth, John Ruskin, and Washington Irving. Biographer Hermione Lee describes Wharton as having read herself "out of Old New York" and her influences included Herbert Spencer, Charles Darwin, Friedrich Nietzsche, T. H. Huxley, George Romanes, James Frazer, and Thorstein Veblen. These influenced her ethnographic style of novelization. Wharton developed a passion for Walt Whitman.

== Works ==
=== Novels ===
- The Valley of Decision, 1902
- The House of Mirth, 1905
- The Fruit of the Tree, 1907
- The Reef, 1912
- The Custom of the Country, 1913
- Summer, 1917
- The Age of Innocence, 1920 (Pulitzer Prize winner)
- The Glimpses of the Moon, 1922
- A Son at the Front, 1923
- The Mother's Recompense, 1925
- Twilight Sleep, 1927
- The Children, 1928
- Hudson River Bracketed, 1929
- The Gods Arrive, 1932
- The Buccaneers, 1938 (unfinished)

=== Novellas and novelette ===
- The Touchstone, 1900
- Sanctuary, 1903
- Madame de Treymes, 1907
- Ethan Frome, 1911
- Bunner Sisters, 1916 (written in 1892)
- The Marne, 1918
- Old New York, 1924
  1. False Dawn; 2. The Old Maid; 3. The Spark; 4. New Year's Day
- Fast and Loose: A Novelette, 1938 (written in 1876–1877)

=== Poetry ===
- Verses, 1878
- Artemis to Actaeon and Other Verse, 1909
- Twelve Poems, 1926

=== Short story collections ===
- The Greater Inclination, 1899, includes "Souls Belated".
- Crucial Instances, 1901
- The Descent of Man and Other Stories, 1904
- The Hermit and the Wild Woman and Other Stories, 1908
- Tales of Men and Ghosts, 1910
- Xingu and Other Stories, 1916
  - "Xingu"; "Coming Home"; "Autres Temps ..."; "Kerfol"; "The Long Run"; "The Triumph of Night"; "The Choice"; "Bunner Sisters"
- Here and Beyond, 1926
- Certain People, 1930
- Human Nature, 1933
- The World Over, 1936
- Ghosts, 1937
  - "All Souls'"; "The Eyes"; "Afterward"; "The Lady's Maid's Bell"; "Kerfol"; "The Triumph of Night"; "Miss Mary Pask"; "Bewitched"; "Mr. Jones"; "Pomegranate Seed"; "A Bottle of Perrier"
- Roman Fever and Other Stories, 1964
  - "Roman Fever"; "Xingu"; "The Other Two"; "Souls Belated"; "The Angel at the Grave"; "The Last Asset"; "After Holbein"; "Autres Temps"
- Madame de Treymes and Others: Four Novelettes, 1970
  - "The Touchstone"; "Sanctuary"; "Madame de Treymes"; "Bunner Sisters"
- The Ghost Stories of Edith Wharton, 1973
  - "The Lady's Maid's Bell"; "The Eyes"; "Afterward"; "Kerfol"; "The Triumph of Night"; "Miss Mary Pask"; "Bewitched"; "Mr Jones"; "Pomegranate Seed"; "The Looking Glass"; "All Souls"
- The Collected Stories of Edith Wharton, 1998 (Carroll & Graf Publishers; paperback, 640 pages)
  - "The Pelican"; "The Other Two"; "The Mission of Jane"; "The Reckoning"; "The Last Asset"; "The Letters"; "Autres Temps ..."; "The Long Run"; "After Holbein"; "Atrophy"; "Pomegranate Seed"; "Her Son"; "Charm Incorporated"; "All Souls"; "The Lamp of Psyche"; "A Journey"; "The Line of Least Resistance"; "The Moving Finger"; "Expiation"; "Les Metteurs en Scene"; "Full Circle"; "The Daunt Diana"; "Afterward"; "The Bolted Door"; "The Temperate Zone"; "Diagnosis"; "The Day of the Funeral"; "Confession"
- The New York Stories of Edith Wharton, 2007 paperback 452 pages, NYREV publishers
  - "Mrs. Manstey's View"; "That Good May Come"; "The Portrait"; "A Cup of Cold Water"; "A Journey"; "The Rembrandt"; "The Other Two"; "The Quicksand"; "The Dilettante"; "The Reckoning"; "Expiation"; "The Pot-Boiler"; "His Father's Son"; "Full Circle"; "Autres Temps"; "The Long Run"; "After Holbein"; "Diagnosis"; "Pomegranate Seed"; "Roman Fever"

=== Non-fiction ===
- The Decoration of Houses, 1897
- Italian Villas and Their Gardens, illustrated by Maxfield Parrish, 1904
- Italian Backgrounds, 1905
- A Motor-Flight Through France, 1908
- The Cruise of the Vanadis, 1910
- Fighting France: From Dunkerque to Belfort, 1915
- French Ways and Their Meaning, 1919
- In Morocco, 1920 (travel)
- The Writing of Fiction, 1925
- A Backward Glance, 1934 (autobiography)
- Edith Wharton: The Uncollected Critical Writings, Edited by Frederick Wegener, 1996
- Edith Wharton Abroad: Selected Travel Writings, 1888–1920, 1995, Edited by Sarah Bird Wright
- "Autres Temps" in Virginia's Sisters, 2023

=== As editor ===
- The Book of the Homeless, 1916

=== Theater ===
- Shadow of a Doubt, 1901

== Adaptations ==
=== Ballet ===
- Ethan Frome was adapted by Cathy Marston as a one-act ballet titled Snowblind for the San Francisco Ballet. The ballet premiered in 2018, with Ulrik Birkkjaer as Ethan, Sarah Van Patten as Zeena and Mathilde Froustey as Mattie.

=== Film ===
- The House of Mirth, a 1918 silent film adaptation of the 1905 novel directed by French film director Albert Capellani, starring Katherine Harris Barrymore as Lily Bart. It is considered to be a lost film.
- The Glimpses Of The Moon, a 1923 silent film adaptation of the 1922 novel directed for Paramount Studios by Allan Dwan, starring Bebe Daniels, David Powell, Nita Naldi and Maurice Costello. It is considered to be a lost film.
- The Age of Innocence, a 1924 silent film adaptation of the 1920 novel directed for Warner Brothers by Wesley Ruggles, starring Beverly Bayne and Elliott Dexter. It is considered to be a lost film.
- The Marriage Playground, a 1929 talking film adaptation of the 1928 novel The Children directed for Paramount Studios by Lothar Mendes, starring rising star Fredric March in leading role (as Martin Boyne), Mary Brian (as Judith Wheater), and Kay Francis (as Lady Wrench).
- The Age of Innocence, a 1934 film adaptation of the 1920 novel directed for RKO Studios by Philip Moeller, starring Irene Dunne and John Boles.
- Strange Wives, a 1934 film adaptation of the 1934 short story Bread Upon the Waters directed for Universal by Richard Thorpe, starring Roger Pryor (as Jimmy King), June Clayworth (as Nadja), and Esther Ralston (as Olga). It is considered to be a lost film.
- The Old Maid, a 1939 film adaptation of the 1924 short novella directed by Edmund Goulding starring Bette Davis.
- A 1944 film version of the 1911 novel Ethan Frome starring Joan Crawford was proposed, but never came to fruition.
- The Children directed by Tony Palmer and released in 1990, starring Ben Kingsley and Kim Novak.
- Ethan Frome directed by John Madden and released in 1993, starring Liam Neeson and Patricia Arquette.
- The Age of Innocence directed by Martin Scorsese and released in 1993, starring Daniel Day-Lewis, Winona Ryder and Michelle Pfeiffer.
- The Reef directed by Robert Allan Ackerman and released in 1999.
- The House of Mirth directed by Terence Davies and released in 2000, starring Gillian Anderson as Lily Bart.
- The Custom of the Country directed by Josie Rourke and starring Sydney Sweeney and Leo Woodall began production in March 2026. lt will be the first ever adaptation of this novel after two previous planned television adaptations failed to materialize.

=== Radio and audio series ===
- The Age of Innocence had an adaption for radio broadcast in 1947.
- Edith Wharton's Journey is a 1996 radio adaptation, for the NPR series Radio Tales, of the short story "A Journey" from Edith Wharton's collection The Greater Inclination.
- Glimpses of The Moon, a modern re-imagining of The Glimpses of the Moon, was produced as an audio series for Audible in 2024.

=== Television ===
- The Touchstone, a live broadcast on CBS April 1951. First Wharton adaptation on television.
- "Grey Reminder"—the April 30, 1951 episode of NBC's Lights Out—is an adaptation of Wharton's story, "The Pomegranate Seed", starring Beatrice Straight, John Newland, Helene Dumas and Parker McCormick.
- Ethan Frome, a 1960 (CBS) TV US adaptation, directed by Alex Segal, starring Sterling Hayden as Ethan Frome, Julie Harris as Mattie Silver and Clarice Blackburn as Zenobia Frome.
- Looking Back, a 1981 TV US loose adaptation of two biographies of Edith Wharton: A Backward Glance, Wharton's own 1934 autobiography & Edith Wharton, a 1975 biography by R.W.B. Lewis (1976 Bancroft Prize-winner).
- The House of Mirth, a 1981 TV US adaptation, directed by Adrian Hall, starring William Atherton, Geraldine Chaplin and Barbara Blossom
- Afterward and Bewitched are both featured in the 1983 Granada Television series Shades of Darkness.
- The Buccaneers, a 1995 BBC mini-series, starring Carla Gugino and Greg Wise
- The Buccaneers, a 2023 Apple TV streaming series. Starring Kristine Frøseth.
- The Age of Innocence is an upcoming miniseries for Netflix with Emma Frost as its showrunner. Production took place in Prague in 2025. It is scheduled to premiere on February 18, 2027.

=== Theater ===
- The House of Mirth was adapted as a play in 1906 by Edith Wharton and Clyde Fitch.
- The Age of Innocence was adapted as a play in 1928. Katharine Cornell played the role of Ellen Olenska.
- The Old Maid was adapted for the stage by Zoë Akins in 1934. It was staged by Guthrie McClintic and starred Judith Anderson and Helen Menken. The play was awarded the Pulitzer Prize for Drama in May 1935. When published, the play had both Akins and Wharton's names on the copyright.
- Shadow of a Doubt made its world stage premiere in 2023 directed by Peter Hinton-Davis produced by the Shaw Festival. The show was designed by Gillian Gallow (Set & Costume) Bonnie Beecher (Lighting) and projections by mixed media artist HAUI (Live Video). The show starred Katherine Gautier as Kate Derwent.

Source (except where otherwise indicated): (Marshall 1996, pp. 21–25)

== Honors ==
- Edith Wharton was honored on a U.S. postage stamp issued on September 5, 1980.
