= Gurcharan Rampuri =

Canadian poet (1929–2018)

Gurcharan Rampuri (Punjabi: ਗੁਰਚਰਨ ਰਾਮਪੁਰੀ; 23 January 1929 – 8 October 2018) was a Canadian poet of Punjabi descent who writes in the Punjabi language. He lived in Coquitlam, British Columbia.

Rampuri has been writing poems in Punjabi for well over 60 years. He lives in Vancouver, BC, where he has lived since 1964. In May 2011, Weavers Press in San Francisco (a member of Small Press Distribution) brought out The Circle of Illusion, a collection of Rampuri's poems translated into English by Amritjit Singh of Ohio University and Judy Ray of Tucson, AZ.

== Works ==
- Kankan di Khushbo
- Qaul Qarar
- Ahnnee Gali
- Kanchni
- Qatalgah
- Agnaar
- Kirnan da Ahlanan

== Awards ==
- K.S. Dhaliwal Award, Ludhiana, India, 1997.
- Nand Lal Noorpuri Award, Yuba City, USA, 1987.
- Panjab Languages Department, Patiala, India, 1984.
- Panjabi Sahit Akadamy, Chandigarh, India, 1982.
- Panjabi Likhari Sabha (Writers Society) Rampur, India, 1980.
