= The House of Mirth =

1905 novel by Edith Wharton

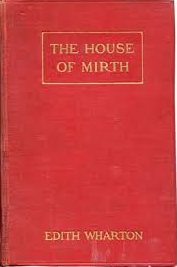
- First edition, 1905
- Author: Edith Wharton
- Language: English
- Genre: Novel, tragedy, comedy of manners
- Published: October 14, 1905; Charles Scribner's Sons
- Publication place: United States
- Media type: Print
- ISBN: 978-1-716-71037-7
- Text: The House of Mirth online

The House of Mirth is a tragedy about Lily Bart, a well-born but penniless young woman belonging to New York City's high society of the 1890s. Written by American author Edith Wharton, it came out October 14, 1905. The House of Mirth traces Lily's slow two-year social descent from privilege to a lonely existence on the margins of society as she fails to marry a man of wealth and status to secure her a place in affluent society. Wharton uses Lily, in critic Shari Benstock's words, as an attack on "an irresponsible, grasping and morally corrupt upper class." (Note: In the opening sentence of the House of Mirth Edith Wharton places Lily in "Grand Central Station" where Selden, a longtime friend and possible love interest is taken by surprise to see her. "Grand Central Depot" became Grand Central Station after extensive renovation of the "head house" between 1899 and 1900. The name Grand Central Station stuck despite further massive reconstruction between 1903 and 1913 when the site was named Grand Central Terminal.)

The House of Mirth was serialized in Scribner's Magazine beginning in January 1905 which created great interest in the story. In November 1905, Charles Scribner wrote to Wharton that the novel was showing "the most rapid sale of any book ever published by Scribner." By the end of December, sales had reached 140,000 copies. Wharton's royalties were valued at more than half a million dollars in today's currency. The commercial and critical success of The House of Mirth solidified Wharton's reputation as a major novelist.

Literary reviewers and critics at the time categorized the novel as both a social satire and a novel of manners. Its commercial success allowed critics to classify it as a genre novel. In 2003, Carol Singley describes it as "a unique blend of romance, realism, and naturalism, [thus transcending] the narrow classification of a novel of manners." The House of Mirth continues to attract readers over a century after its first publication because Lily Bart's life and death matters as the existential struggle between "who we are and what society tells us we should be."

The House of Mirth was Wharton's second published novel, preceded by two novellas, The Touchstone (1900) and Sanctuary (1903), and a novel, The Valley of Decision (1902).

== Background, themes, and purposes ==
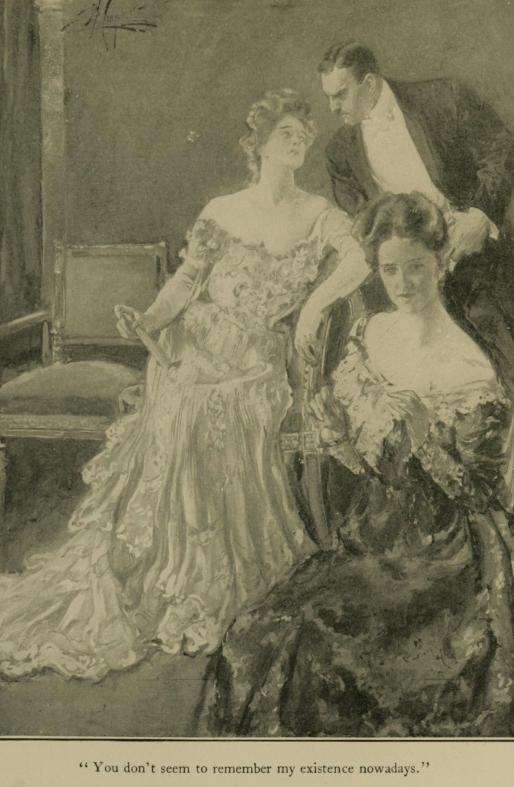
In The House of Mirth (1905), Lily Bart attracts the attentions of a married man.

Wharton considered several titles for the novel about Lily Bart; (Note: The Year of the Rose also appears in one of her donnée books as a possible title for her novel.) two were germane to her purpose:

A Moment's Ornament appears in the first stanza of William Wordsworth's (1770–1850) poem, "She was a Phantom of Delight" (1804), that describes an ideal of feminine beauty:

She was a Phantom of delight
When first she gleam'd upon my sight;
A lovely Apparition, sent
To be a moment's ornament:
Her eyes as stars of twilight fair;
Like twilight's, too, her dusky hair;
But all things else about her drawn
From May-time and the cheerful dawn;
A dancing shape, an image gay,
To haunt, to startle, and waylay.

— CLXXIV: She was a Phantom of Delight, first stanza (1804)

"A moment's ornament" (Note: Cynthia Griffin Wolff tells us (as cited in Restuccia (404)) "In the first Donnée Book,". . ."'A Moment's Ornament' appears as the initial title of the novel." Wolff goes on to pinpoint a "pernicious form of femininity"—"femininity as the 'art of being'—as the subject of. . .'the House of Mirth'.") represents the way Wharton describes Lily's relationship to her reference group as a beautiful and well-bred socialite. Her value lasts only as long as her beauty and good standing with the group is maintained. By centering the story around a portrait of Lily, Wharton was able to address directly the social limitations imposed on her. These included the mores of the upper crust social class to which Lily belonged by birth, education, and breeding.

The final title Wharton chose for the novel was The House of Mirth (1905), (Note: In January 1905, New York was rocked by a public scandal involving major insurance firms, specifically the Equitable Life Assurance Society, Mutual Life Insurance Company, and New York Life. The crisis erupted when James Hazen Hyde, the majority owner of Equitable Life, threw a notoriously decadent French court costume ball, allegedly using company funds. The resulting outrage launched New York state's Armstrong investigation, exposing political bribes and the lavish lifestyles of insurance executives. During the investigation, press coverage regularly used "the House of Mirth" to describe the corrupt, opulent centers of influence where insurance executives and politicians mingled and lived in luxury at the expense of working-class policyholders. The primary concrete evidence came from the testimony surrounding Andrew C. Fields, a lobbyist for Mutual Life. Fields maintained a sumptuously furnished, company-funded home in Albany, New York, used specifically to entertain, bribe, and manipulate state legislators. During the 1905 hearings, it was revealed that this residence was mockingly or lightheartedly nicknamed "the House of Mirth". Newspapers across the country seized on the phrase during their coverage of the hearings. Literary scholar Wayne W. Westbrook has argued that Edith Wharton (who was deeply aware of the financial and social affairs of Gilded Age New York) may have drawn inspiration for her novel's title from the emerging Wall Street and insurance corruption stories. Westbrook provides a literary-historical examination of how Wharton's serialization of her novel in 1905 ran side-by-side with real-life news headlines using the exact same phrase to lampoon Gilded Age greed. However, despite the thematic alignment, the overlap may have been a coincidence. The serialization pre-dated the investigation: the Edith Wharton Society notes that she began writing the novel in 1903 under various working titles, including The Year of the Rose and A Moment's Ornament, before settling on The House of Mirth. The serial publication ran from January to November 1905, whereas the full weight of the Armstrong investigation and the intense newspaper campaign surrounding the insurance "House of Mirth" did not peak until late spring and fall of 1905. Also, in her working notebooks and letters, Wharton attributed the title to Ecclesiastes 7:4 as a moral critique of New York's upper class, rather than a direct reference to insurance lobbying.) taken from the Old Testament:

The heart of the wise is in the house of mourning; but the heart of fools is in the house of mirth.

— Ecclesiastes 7:4

The House of Mirth spotlights social context as equally important to the development of the story's purpose, as the heroine. (Note: Louise Barnett (1989) analyzes The House of Mirth as a "speech act drama" and interprets high society as a fully realized character. She further posits that in this "speech act drama" the only language that exists is for social discourse dominated by the linguistic strategies of men, yielding no language for personal discourse. Thus, the "word that would have saved both Lily and Selden. . .remains unuttered and unutterable"(61)as cited in Killoran(34)) "Mirth" contrasted with "mourning" also bespeaks a moral purpose as it underscores the frivolity of a social set that not only worships money, but also uses it ostentatiously solely for its own amusement and aggrandizement. At the time the novel takes place, Old New York high society was peopled by the extraordinarily wealthy who were conditioned by the economic and social changes the Gilded Age (1870–1900) wrought. Wharton's birth around the time of the Civil War predates that period by a little less than a decade. As a member of the privileged Old New York society, (Note: Carol Singley defines "Old New York" society this way: "Wharton's family represented a class of American aristocrats made comfortable from inherited wealth, steeped in traditional values, and well practiced in patterns of ritualized behavior. Members of her society socialized with one another and shunned the ostentation of the nouveau riche, who after the Civil War were making their way into the ranks of Old New York."(5)) she was eminently qualified to describe it authentically. She also had license to criticize the ways New York high society of the 1890s had changed without being vulnerable to accusations of envy motivated by coming from a lower social caste. (Note: Ironically, critics in the '20s and '30s criticized Wharton precisely because of her wealth and pedigree as a member of "old money" Manhattan. They reasoned that "such a woman could not understand the average working person. . . ." and that "[Wharton's] upper-class characters. . .constituted too narrow a subject matter. . . ." to be of any importance to the real world. (3)) She accused her peers of having lost the sense of noblesse oblige of their forebears.

Wharton revealed in her introduction to the 1936 reprint of The House of Mirth her choice of subject and her major theme:

When I wrote House of Mirth I held, without knowing it, two trumps in my hand. One was the fact that New York society in the nineties was a field as yet unexploited by a novelist who had grown up in that little hot-house of tradition and conventions; and the other, that as yet these traditions and conventions were unassailed, and tacitly regarded as unassailable.

— Introduction to 1936 Edition, The House of Mirth 32–33

Wharton figured that no one had written about New York society because it offered nothing worth writing about. But that did not deter her as she thought something of value could be mined there. If only the writer could dig deeply enough below the surface, some "stuff o' the conscience" could be found. She went on to declare unabashedly that:

[I]n spite of the fact I wrote about totally insignificant people, and 'dated' them by an elaborate stage-setting of manners, furniture and costume, the book still lives and has now attained the honour of figuring on the list of the Oxford University Press. . . . Such people always rest on an underpinning of wasted human possibilities and it seemed to me the fate of the persons embodying these possibilities ought to redeem my subject from insignificance.

— Introduction to 1936 Edition, The House of Mirth 33

That the life and death of Lily Bart matters to modern readers suggests that Wharton succeeded in her purpose as Carol Singley describes it: to critique "a society so relentlessly materialistic and self-serving that it casually destroys what is most beautiful and blameless within it."

== Plot summary ==
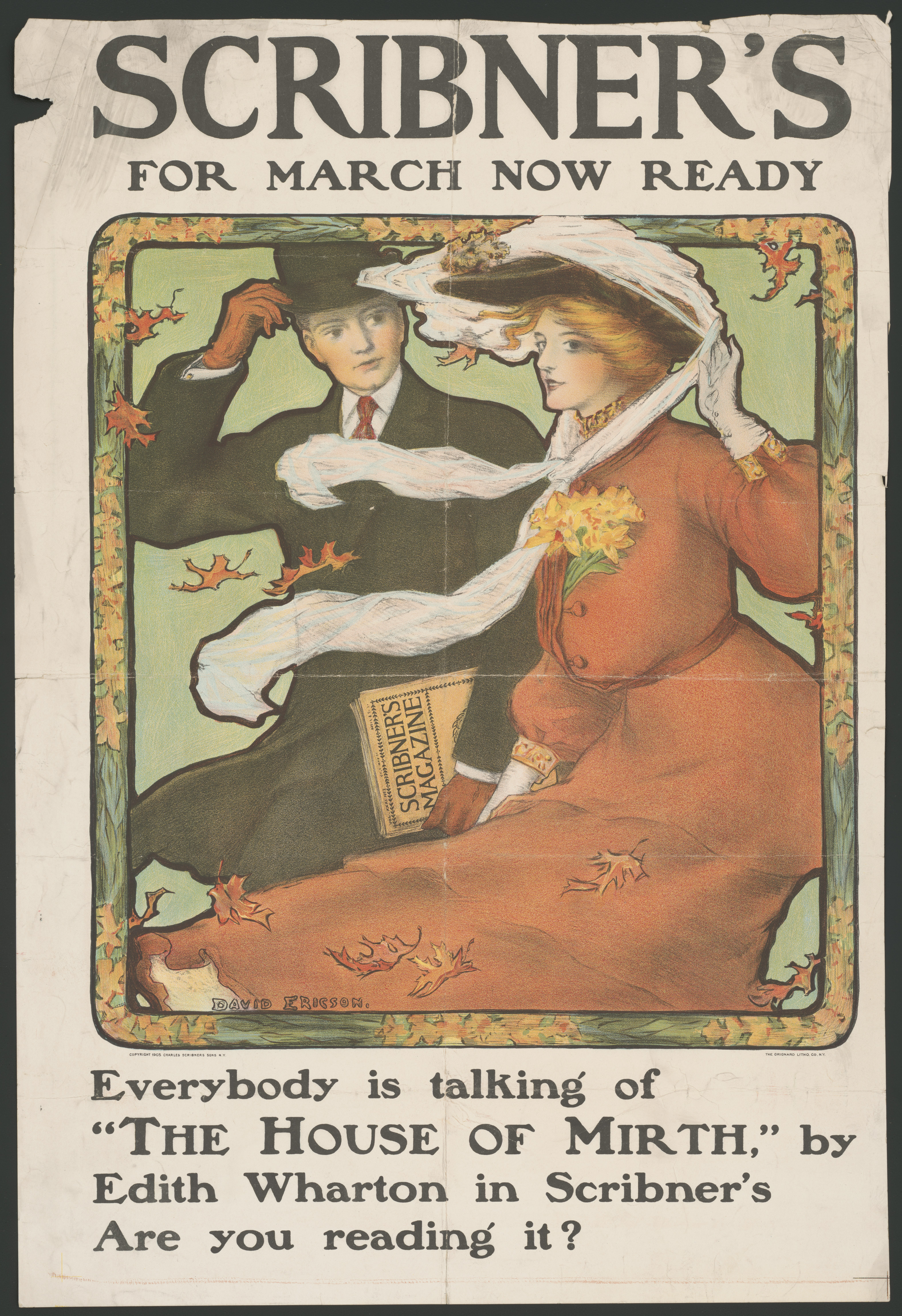
Poster for the serialized debut of The House of Mirth in Scribner's Magazine (1905)

Lily Bart, aged 29, is an impoverished socialite who seeks a husband to secure her future. Her success is challenged by her advancing age — at twenty-nine, she has been on the "marriage market" for more than ten years — and her debts from gambling at bridge. Lily admires lawyer Lawrence Selden, but he is too poor for her to seriously consider marrying; instead, her only prospects are the coarse and vulgar Simon Rosedale, a financier, and the wealthy but dull Percy Gryce.

Lily grew up surrounded by elegance and luxury — an atmosphere which she believes she cannot live without. The loss of her father's wealth, coupled with the death of her parents, left her an orphan at twenty. Lacking an inheritance or a caring protector, she adapts to life as a ward of her strait-laced aunt, Julia Peniston, from whom she receives an erratic allowance, a fashionable address, and food, but little direction or parenting. Lily loathes the neglectful Julia but is forced to rely on her for her necessities and luxuries.

Lily learns that Lawrence and heiress Bertha Dorset were once lovers. She also confides her money problems to Gus Trenor, a stockbroker and the husband of her childhood friend Judy, receiving from him a check for $5,000 and an investment of $4,000 in her name. Trenor tries to exploit his generosity to make a romantic move, but Lily spurns his attentions. Bertha still has feelings for Lawrence notwithstanding her recent breakup with him, but Lawrence has feelings for Lily. Bertha aims to ruin Lily's budding romance with Percy by filling him in on salacious and scandalous rumors about Lily's card-playing and past romantic life. This effectively frightens Percy away. Lily, unaware of Bertha's machinations, blames Judy for having been the one to set the match up.

In retribution for a social snub, Lily's cousin Grace Stepney informs Julia of rumors that Lily is having an affair with Gus to obtain money so she can pay off her gambling debts. This plants seeds of doubt and discomfort in Julia who, though shocked, chooses to accept the rumors without speaking to her niece.

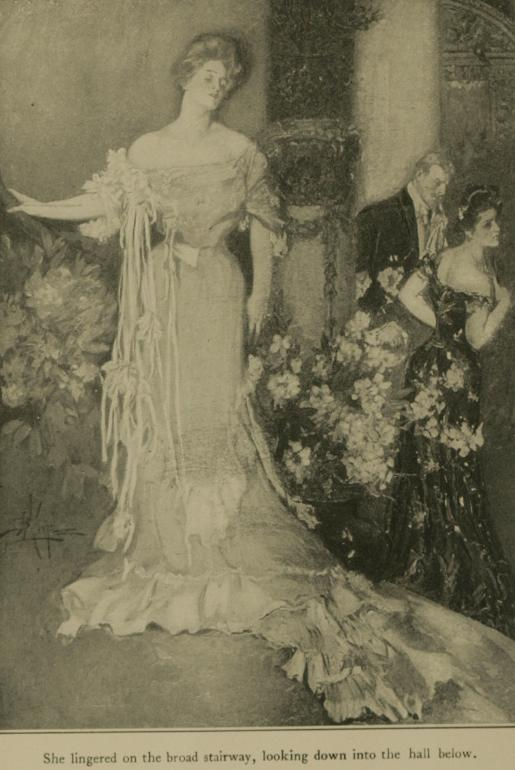
The tragic heroine of The House of Mirth (1905), Lily Bart, lingers at the broad staircase, observing the high-society people gathered in the hall below.

Furthermore, Lily has soured her relationships with both Gus, who is angered by her spurning him, and Judy, because she refuses to visit her at Bellomont lest Gus confront her and reveal that she had manipulated him for financial gain.

To avoid having to spend time alone with Julia, the Trenors, Simon Rosedale, or anyone else she considers a possible source of embarrassment or boredom, Lily begins to accept invitations from people with whom she would not ordinarily socialize. These include the Wellington Brys, who are newcomers to the New York social scene, and whose social rise is being engineered by Carry Fisher. Carry, a fallen aristocrat who supports herself by acting as a social secretary to usher newly wealthy people into fashionable society, invites Lily to social events hosted by Louisa Bry. Lily also attends the opera with Carry, Simon, and Gus. In the eyes of high society, Lily cheapens herself by voluntarily associating with her social inferiors. She returns to Bellomont only to find that her peers now look at her with derision and disgust.

One of Julia's temporary servants, who is also the charwoman at Lawrence's apartment, sells Lily a package of torn love letters. These were written by Bertha Dorset years earlier, and they represent a chance for Lily to deal with her enemy. But instead of blackmailing Bertha into a positive relationship, Lily tries to neutralize the gossip by making herself useful to Bertha. Bertha, who is in a sexual relationship with Ned Silverton, relies on Lily to distract her husband, George.

The extent to which Lily's reputation is damaged becomes obvious when she publicly appears in a way that comes across as advertising her availability for an illicit relationship. Following Carry's advice, the Wellington Brys throw a large "general entertainment" featuring tableaux vivants portrayed by a dozen fashionable women in their set, including Miss Bart.

The standout of this event was the portrayal of Mrs. Lloyd in Sir Joshua Reynolds' 18th-century painting (1775–1776). The portrait shows a woman dressed suggestively. (Note: the portrait shows "a woman in profile with her hair piled high, carving her husband's name on a tree and dressed in an ivory robe that looks diaphanously loose and provocatively clinging at once.") As the curtain opens on this last scene, the gasp of approval heard from the audience is not so much for Reynolds' interpretation of Mrs. Lloyd as it is for the loveliness of Lily Bart herself. This marks the height of her social success, but also the destruction of her remaining reputation. Come what may, she has transitioned from a marriageable "girl" to a not-quite-reputable woman similar to Carry Fisher. Yet she does not do as Carry Fisher does and instead accepts the loss of her respectability as the price she must pay to maintain a position in society.

As Lawrence observes her in the "tableau", he sees the real Lily Bart as if for the first time (Note: Wharton describes the impression Lily's pose has on Selden as "divested of the trivialities of her little world, and catching for a moment a note of that eternal harmony of which her beauty was a part.(139)") and feels the desire to be with her. He finds her alone in the ballroom toward the end of the musical interlude, as the collective praise from her admirers is subsiding. Lawrence leads her to a garden and tells her that he loves her. They eventually kiss. Lily sighs, " 'Ah, love me, love me—but don't tell me so!' " and takes her leave. (Note: "Lily's artistic skill has been entirely focused on reading this theatrical effect—a gorgeous, static, utterly silent rendition of self. Paradoxically, it is here Lawrence finally supposes that he has glimpsed the real Lily Bart and that he might love her. Yet, it is also here that Lily despairs of realizing true comradeship. The very terms of her success have revealed the impossibility of concocting a new narrative with Lawrence. She no longer even asks for friendship but instead sadly inquires, 'Why can't we be friends? You promised once to help me' (22).) As Lawrence gathers his coat to leave, he is disturbed by Ned Van Alstyne's remarks, ". . . .Gad, what a show of good-looking women; but not one of 'em could touch that little cousin of mine. . . . I never knew till tonight what an outline Lily has."

Lily pleads with Julia to help settle her debts and confesses her addiction to gambling. Julia feels taken advantage of and refuses to help, except to cover the bill for her clothes and accessories. Feeling trapped and disgraced, Lily turns to thoughts of Lawrence as her savior and has a change of heart towards him as she looks forward to his next visit at four o'clock.

Instead, her visitor turns out to be Simon Rosedale who, smitten by her appearance in the tableau, proposes a marriage that would be mutually beneficial. Considering what Rosedale knows about her, she pleads for time to consider his offer. (Note: Lily skillfully says, "But I should be selfish and ungrateful if I made [carelessness about money and worry about bills] a reason for accepting all you offer, with no better return to make than the desire to be free of my anxieties. You must give me time—time to think of your kindness—and of what I can give you in return for it—" (176)) Lawrence does not appear for his 4:00 appointment nor does he send word in explanation. Instead, he has departed for Havana and then on to Europe for a business trip.

To escape the rumors arising from the gossip caused by her financial dealings with Gus, and also disappointed by what she interprets as Lawrence's emotional withdrawal, Lily accepts Bertha's spur-of-the-moment invitation to join her and George on a Mediterranean cruise aboard their yacht; Lily is expected once again to hide Bertha's affair. Lily's decision to accept the offer proves to be her social undoing.

To divert the attention and suspicion of their social circle away from her, Bertha insinuates that Lily is carrying on a romantic and sexual liaison with George by instructing her not to sleep on the yacht in front of their friends at the close of a dinner the Brys held for the Duchess in Monte Carlo. Lawrence inadvertently helps by arranging a night's lodging, under the promise that she leave in the morning. The ensuing social scandal ruins Lily's reputation and causes friends to abandon her and Julia to disinherit her.

Undeterred, Lily fights to regain her place in high society by advising Mr. and Mrs. Gormer on their entry into the aristocracy, but when the couple learn of the "scandalous" personal background of their new secretary, they chase her out rather than risk losing their new standing. Only two friends remain for Lily: Gerty Farish (a cousin of Lawrence) and Carry, who help her cope with the social ignominy of a degraded social status while continually advising Lily to marry soon.

Despite the efforts of both Carry and Farish, Lily descends through the social strata of New York City's high society. She obtains a job as personal secretary of Mrs. Hatch, a disreputable woman who nearly succeeds in marrying a wealthy young man in Lily's former social circle. During this occupation, she is introduced to the use of chloral hydrate, sold in drugstores, as a remedy for malaise. Lawrence warns her that working for Mrs Hatch is putting her in a false position, and once she realises the truth of this, Lily resigns. She then finds a job in a milliner's shop; unaccustomed to working-class manual labor, her rate of production is low, and the quality of her workmanship is poor, exacerbated by her increased use of the drug. She is fired at the end of the New York social season, when the demand for fashionable hats has diminished.

Meanwhile, Simon reappears in her life and tries to rescue her, but Lily is unwilling to meet his terms. Simon wants Lily to use the love letters that she bought from Lawrence's servant to expose the love affair between Lawrence and Bertha, thus crushing a potential rival and allowing him to further ascend up the social ladder. For the sake of Lawrence's reputation, Lily does not act upon Rosedale's request and secretly burns the letters when she visits Lawrence one last time.

Lily is stopped on the street by Nettie Struther, who Lily once helped get to a sanatorium. Nettie is now married and has a baby girl. Touched by Lily's exhausted state, and eager to show her how she has profited from her help, she invites her back to her modest tenement home, and introduces her to the baby.

Eventually, Lily receives a ten-thousand-dollar inheritance following Julia's death, which she uses to repay Gus. Distraught by her misfortunes, Lily is now crippled by drug dependence. Once she has repaid all her debts, Lily takes an overdose and dies; perhaps it is suicide, perhaps an accident. While dying, she hallucinates cradling Nettie's baby in her arms. That morning, Lawrence arrives at her quarters to propose marriage, but finds Lily dead. Among her belongings are bank receipts proving that her dealings with Gus were honorable and that the rumors that destroyed her were always false. This realization allows a distraught Lawrence to feel sympathy for her.

== Characters ==
Lily Bart — Wharton paints Lily, the 29-year-old heroine of her novel, as a complex personality with a given name that suggests purity and a surname that implies defiance, (Note: Jeffrey Myers tells us, "Lily Bart's surname means 'beard' in German; and in English 'to beard' means 'to defy' and 'to oppose boldly.' Though Lily defies social conventions, her first name is the Virgin Mary's symbol of purity and innocence . . . ." (XXIII)) and the foolishness that the title of the novel implies. The combination of the social pressures and conventions of her reference group and her refusal to "settle" numerous times to save herself portend a fateful destiny where she becomes complicit in her own destruction. Wharton depicts Lily as having an aesthetic purpose in life—a fine specimen to be looked at and admired. Her extraordinary beauty should have served her well to find a wealthy husband with the requisite social status that would have secured her place in upper-class New York society. However, her inner longing to become free of her society's social conventions, her sense of what is right, and her desire for love as well as money and status have thwarted her success in spite of a number of eligible admirers over the ten years she has been on the marriage market. Challenges to her success are her advancing age—she is 29 as the novel begins—the loss of her father's wealth, and the death of her parents which has left her orphaned without a caring protector, her constant efforts to "keep up with the Joneses"(4), (Note: Singley reports that Edith Wharton's mother, Lucretia Rhinelander Jones, had such high social aspirations, it gave rise to the expression "keeping up with the Joneses.") the very modest but erratic "allowance" from her strait-laced Aunt Julia, and her gambling debts which make her the subject of vile gossip. To protect Lawrence Selden's reputation, she refuses to use damning evidence against her nemesis, Bertha Dorset, which would have recouped her ruined social standing. This leads to a tragic yet heroic ending.

Lawrence Selden — A young lawyer who, although not wealthy himself, is able to move within and without Old New York's elite social circles through kinship with old-line New York families. He has known Lily since her "coming out" eleven years earlier. For all this time he has been in the background of her life. He views the comings and goings of New York's high society with the detachment and the objectivity of an outsider —a characteristic that Lily not only admires but also that allows her to view those people in her surroundings in an objective, critical and a not-so-flattering way. She becomes fascinated and envies his independence from the "tribe" and the freedom that has given him. (Note: Lily muses as she reflects on her social constraints compared to Selden's freedom, "How alluring the world outside the [great gilt] cage appeared as she heard its door clang on her! In reality, as she knew, the door never clanged: it stood always open; but most of the captives were like flies in a bottle, and having once flown in, could never regain their freedom. It was Selden's distinction that he had never forgotten the way out." (70)) Her encounters with Selden underscore the conflict between her inner voice —her self-hood at its core— and the outer voices of her reference group. It is from Selden's description, assessment and admiration of Lily's outward characteristics that we glean those attributes that contribute to New York high society's perception and misperceptions of who she is. He can be honest about Lily's superficiality and artificiality and simultaneously appreciate the sparks of freedom and spontaneity that temper these negatives. These mutual admirable qualities give way to their romantic regard for one another. He is not, however, free from the social pressure of rumor. Though he has shown Lily consistent friendship, he abandons her when she becomes the victim of appearances that put her virtue, as an unmarried woman, in question.

Simon Rosedale — A successful and socially astute Jewish businessman—the quintessential parvenu—who has the money but not the social standing to be accepted into the circle of New York's leisure class. Building his fortune in real estate, Rosedale makes his first appearance in the story when he observes Lily leaving his apartment building after what appears to be a tryst with one of his tenants. Rosedale is interested in Lily because not only is she beautiful, but what is more important, she is also a social asset in gaining him a place in high society. She reflects that she has put herself in his power by her clumsy dress-maker fib and her refusal to allow him to take her to the station which would have given him the prestige of being seen by members of the society with whom he was aspiring to gain acceptance. As his social ascent continues, he offers Lily marriage which would provide her a way out of her financial dilemma and her precarious social standing; she puts him off. His cleverness and business acumen serve him well to achieve a higher and higher rung on the social ladder. Lily, however, is on her way down to the point that Rosedale is no longer interested in marrying her. Despite the differences in their social standing, Rosedale by the end of the story shows compassion for Lily. He offers her a loan when he runs into her after she has lost her hat-making job—an offer she refuses.

Percy Gryce — A conservative, rich, but shy and unimaginative young eligible bachelor on whom Lily, with the support of her friend Judy Trenor, sets her sights. Percy's less than titillating personality notwithstanding, Lily works out a strategy to catch him at week-long festivities at Bellomont. Her fortuitous and successful encounter with Percy on the train to Bellomont further encourages her in pursuit of her goal. Her strategy gets interrupted, however, when Selden at week's end also appears on the scene unexpectedly. Lily then decides, on the spur of the moment, to set aside her well-thought-out tactics to pursue Percy in favor of spending some time with Selden. When, at a more rational moment, she returns to pursuing Percy, his mother-in law-to-be tells Lily at Jack Stepney's and Gwen Van Osburgh's wedding about his engagement to Evie Van Osburgh.

Bertha Dorset (Mrs. George Dorset) — A petite and pretty high-society matron whose husband George is extremely wealthy. She is first introduced catching the train to Bellomont where she boards with great fanfare and commotion. She demands that the porter find her a seat with her friends, Lily and Percy. Once at Bellomont Judy Trenor intimates to Lily that Bertha is manipulative and also unscrupulous such that it is better to have her as a friend rather than an enemy. It is well known that Bertha is bored with her husband and seeks attention and love outside the confines of marriage. At Bellomont Bertha continues to pursue Selden in an attempt to rekindle the flame of an adulterous affair they have been carrying on but with which he has become disenamored. As Book I ends, she invites Lily to accompany her on a Mediterranean cruise to distract her husband so she can carry on an affair with Ned Silverton. Bertha understands, as a married woman, she must keep up appearances and ruthlessly impugns Lily's reputation to mask her own adultery. She spreads false rumors that besmirch Lily's virtue among their friends. Lily, as an unmarried woman without a protector, has little she can do in her own defense.

Mrs. Peniston (Julia) — Lily's wealthy, widowed Aunt –sister to Lily's father. Mrs. Peniston embodies "old-school" morality and has a family pedigree that goes back to the industrious and successful Dutch families of early New York. Although she maintains an opulent residence on fashionable Fifth Avenue, she does not follow fashion or renovate constantly to maintain a chic appearance. In Lily's eyes, the Peniston home is therefore dingy. Mrs. Peniston's "Old New York" lifestyle requires keeping her drawing room neat, eating well and dressing expensively. She harbors a passive attitude and does not actively engage in life. Although she spends time in the country during the first part of the book, by the last half of the book she is a shut-in with significant heart problems. When Lily arrived in New York in financial distress after the death of her mother, Mrs. Peniston took pleasure in the public display of her generosity by agreeing to take Lily on for a year after her mother died—much to the relief of the extended family. She found, to her surprise, that she liked the volatile Lily. She therefore continued to support Lily for over a decade during Lily's fruitless search for a wealthy, socially connected husband. She indulges and passively enables Lily's habit of gallivanting with her fashionable friends, and ignores the way Lily avoids and abandons her. Although Lily is clearly Julia's favorite, displacing her previous favorite Grace Stepney, Julia never makes any verbal or written promise to provide for Lily in the long term. Although Lily and her friends believe that is "understood" that she will inherit most if not all of Julia's fortune, Julia herself never made such a statement. Indeed, her forbearance is stretched to the limit when rumors reach her that Lily gambles for money and is encouraging attention from married men who compensate her for it. As upset as Julia is by evidence of Lily's immoral behavior, she does not immediately ask Lily for details because it is easier to discredit the messenger. When Lily comes to Julia asking for money to pay various debts, including what Lily passes off as gambling debts, Julia refuses. The relationship is permanently damaged, and when Lily sails away with the Dorsets instead of cleaning up the social and financial mess she has made, Julia does not write to Lily or attempt to repair the relationship. When word reaches her that Lily has been publicly accused of having an affair with George Dorset, and when Lily continues to gallivant in Europe instead of returning home, Julia disinherits Lily in favor of the more loyal Grace Stepney. By the time Lily returns to New York, Julia has died, and nobody knows about the disinheritance until her will is read.

Judy Trenor (Mrs. Gus Trenor) — Lily's best friend and confidante— is the stereotypical high-society matron, married to Gus Trenor, a successful business man. She frequently hosts large parties and social events at their country home, Bellomont. By engaging in gossip Mrs. Trenor keeps up on the social scene. She acts as matchmaker between Lily and Percy Gryce. She uses Lily as her surrogate private secretary and spends much of her day making sure that every detail of her events is done to perfection. This includes poring over lists to decide which guests are the most desirable to invite, which have been "stolen" by another conflicting event, and which unmarried men and women should be set up together. She invites Selden to Bellomont on anonymous advice to keep Mrs. George Dorset entertained. Judy suffers from frequent headaches and avoids noisy environments such as the opera. She must sometimes cancel minor engagements on short notice, and prefers to stay at Bellomont when her head hurts.

Gus Trenor—Judy Trenor's husband—a massive man with a heavy carnivorous head and a very red complexion. He is a successful stock market speculator and an advocate of Simon Rosedale's acceptance in high society circles although he considers him a bounder. He is also a notorious flirt and looks for attention in relationships with women outside of his marriage. Gus becomes enamored of Lily, a frequent guest at his wife's weekend social events. He uses his financial investment skills and a large sum of his own money in a risky investment for Lily which she agrees to. The proceeds from this speculation will help her pay her gambling debts and other expenses necessary to keep up appearances. The investment pays off for Lily financially, as Gus intends that it should, but the friendship turns sour when Lily is unwilling to exchange romantic attention for money the way Gus believes she tacitly agrees to do.

Carry Fisher (Mrs. Fisher) — A small, fiery and dramatic divorcée. She is perceived as carrying "a general air of embodying a 'spicy paragraph';"(70) and according to Mrs. Trenor, ". . .most of her alimony is paid by other women's husbands." (91) She sponges money from Gus Trenor to cover her bills much to his wife's chagrin. Although Gus accepts romantic favors from Mrs. Fisher in exchange for paying her bills and investing her money in the stock market, he considers her a "battered wire-puller"(94) in comparison to the fresh and unsullied Miss Bart. Carry is also known for bringing newcomers into high society such as Rosedale and the Wellington Brys, who had managed the miracle of making money in a falling market. After Lily has been expelled from the upper class by Bertha, Carry is one of the few people who still show compassion toward her, offering Lily support and job opportunities. Carry is an example of a woman who finds ways to earn money and to succeed in society despite being divorced and somewhat disreputable. Her presence in the story refutes the notion that Lily has no choice except to self-destruct.

Ned Silverton — A young man, whose first intention was to live on proofreading and write an epic, but ended up living off his friends. Ned's romantic relationship at the Bellomont house party is with Carry Fisher. Six months later, Ned accompanies Lily and the Dorsets on their Mediterranean cruise. He has an affair with Mrs Dorset, who manages to keep it concealed from most of society. Ned's increasing gambling addiction consumes not only his resources but that of his sisters, who live in poverty while he travels with Bertha Dorset. After the fling with Bertha ends, Ned participates in a scheme to help a purportedly wealthy but disreputable woman to marry the younger brother of Gwen and Evie Van Osburgh. This conspiracy, in which Lily is implicated, helps ensure Lily's downfall.

Evie Van Osburgh — A young heiress to a substantial fortune. Judy Trenor paired her sister, Gwen, with Percy Gryce at the Sunday-night supper at Bellomont. Evie ends up getting engaged within six weeks of their stay at Bellomont to Percy Gryce due to Bertha Dorset's match-making skills.

Gerty Farish — Selden's cousin. She is a kind, generous woman who occupies herself with charity work, but Lily despises her because of her less than glamorous appearance. In Book Two, Gerty becomes one of Lily's only friends, giving her a place to stay and taking care of her when everyone else abandons her. Lily does not wish to continue living with Gerty or combining resources because she is unwilling to lower herself to the standard of living Gerty can afford.

Jack Stepney and Gwen (Van Osburgh) Stepney — A very wealthy couple—guests at Bellomont just before celebrating their wedding at the Van Osburgh's estate six weeks later. They belong to Old New York's high society, although their money comes from Gwen's side. Prior to his marriage, the nearly bankrupt Jack has business dealings with Simon Rosedale and has tried to afford him entrée into New York's high society. After marrying Gwen, Jack becomes plump, conservative, and complacent. Jack is Lily's cousin so he agrees to shelter her for the night after Bertha kicks her off her yacht for ostensibly carrying on romantically with Bertha's husband.

Grace Stepney — Lily's middle-aged cousin lives in a boarding house and has spent most of her life waiting on Julia Peniston. Until Lily arrived, Grace was Julia's favorite: she shares Julia's conservatism and sense of propriety, and she is willing to help out during the fall cleaning. Grace attracts and remembers all manner of gossip related to high society in general and to Lily in particular, but does not generally gossip herself. Lily treats Grace very poorly, regarding her as insignificant. When Lily prevails on her aunt Julia to exclude Grace from a family dinner party, Grace retaliates. She relays to Aunt Julia the talk about Lily's attention to Gus Trenor in exchange for money that Lily used to pay gambling debts, and stops protecting Lily from the otherwise predictable consequences of Lily's actions. When Lily comes to Grace after the reading of the will, Grace does not have the money to give Lily the loan she is asking for because the assets Grace inherited from Julia are still tied up in probate. When Lily asks Grace to borrow money against Aunt Julia's estate and lend or give it to Lily, Grace refuses.

== Critical reception ==
In the contemporary book review "New York Society Held up to Scorn in three New Books" (15 October 1905) The New York Times critic said that The House of Mirth is "a novel of remarkable power" and that "its varied elements are harmoniously blended, and [that] the discriminating reader who has completed the whole story in a protracted sitting, or two, must rise from it with the conviction that there are no parts of it which do not properly and essentially belong to the whole. Its descriptive passages have verity and charm, it has the saving grace of humor, its multitude of personages, as we have said, all have the semblance of life."

The publication of the novel prompted letters to the editor of the "New York Times Saturday Review of Books" which argued the merits of the story, saying that the novel was a faithful and true portrait of the New York City gentry, while detractors said that it impugned the character of the city's social élite as a heartless and materialist leisure class.

== Adaptations ==
The novel The House of Mirth (1905) has been adapted to radio, the stage and the cinema.

- The Play of the novel The House of Mirth (1906), by Edith Wharton and Clyde Fitch.
- The House of Mirth (1918), directed by Albert Capellani, featured Katherine Corri Harris as Lily Bart.
- The House of Mirth was presented on radio's Theatre Guild on the Air December 14, 1952. The one-hour adaptation starred Joan Fontaine and Franchot Tone.
- "The House of Mirth" radio drama, along with Isabel Bolton's essay about Edith Wharton, played on NBC University Theater on October 9, 1949.
- The House of Mirth (1956). NBC Matinee Theater: Season 2, Episode 56. (4 December 1956)
- The House of Mirth (1981), directed by Adrian Hall. A television film for PBS.
- Edith Wharton's The House of Mirth (1995) adapted for the stage by Dawn Keeler. The play was performed by the Cambridge Theatre Company at the Theatre Royal in Winchester, England. After the initial production, the play toured England for nine weeks. This modern adaptation offers a late-twentieth-century interpretation of Lily Bart's story that emphasizes freedom, relationships, and tragedy.
- The House of Mirth (2000), directed by Terence Davies, featured Gillian Anderson as Lily Bart.
- Composer Garth Baxter wrote the opera Lily based on The House of Mirth, with a libretto by Lisa VanAuken. Lily is a two-act opera in the romantic tradition with full orchestra. Arias from the opera have been featured in two albums: Katherine Keem Sings Songs and Arias by Garth Baxter, from Centaur Records; and ASK THE MOON, music for voice and piano by Garth Baxter from Navona Records.

== Sources ==
- Auchincloss, Louis (1961). Edith Wharton and her New Yorks, Reflections of a Jacobite. Boston: Houghton Mifflin.
- Barnett, Louise K.(1989). "Language, gender and society in The House of Mirth". Connecticut Review 11.2 (Summer), 54–63.
- Commander, Katherine Lucille (2008). "Tragedy in The House of Mirth: The decline of Lily Bart" University of Tennessee Honors Thesis Projects.http://trace.tennessee.edu/utk_chanhonoproj/1165
- Killoran, Hellen. (2001). The Critical Reception of Edith Wharton. Rochester, NY: Camden House. ISBN 1-57113-101-9.
- Lewis, R. W. B. (1975). Edith Wharton: A Biography (First ed.). New York, NY: Harper & Row. ISBN 0-06-012603-5.
- Meyers, Jeffrey (2004), Introduction in Wharton, Edith (2004). The House of Mirth. Barnes & Noble. ISBN 1-59308-153-7.
- Quindlen, Anna (2000), Introduction in Wharton, Edith (2015). The House of Mirth. NY: Signet Classics The Penguin Group. pp. v–xi. ISBN 978-0-451-47430-8.
- Rattray, L. (ed.). (2012). Edith Wharton in Context. New York: Cambridge University Press. 400pp.
- Showalter, Elaine, "The death of the lady (novelist): Wharton's House of Mirth" in Carol J. Singley, ed. (2003). Edith Wharton's The House of Mirth, A Case Book, pp. 39–61. New York: Oxford University Press. p. 337. ISBN 0-19-515603-X.
- Wharton, Edith (1905, Vol. 37) (1905). "The House of Mirth, Book I, Chaps. XI–XIII". books.google.com. Scribner's Magazine.
- Singley, Carol J., Introduction in Carol J. Singley, ed. (2003). Edith Wharton's The House of Mirth, A Case Book, pp. 3–24. New York: Oxford University Press. p. 337. ISBN 0-19-515603-X.
- Wharton, Edith., The House of Mirth: The Complete Text in Shari Benstock, ed. (1994). Case Studies in Contemporary Criticism: Edith Wharton, The House of Mirth pp.25-305. Boston * New York: Bedford Books of St. Martin's Press. pp. 498. ISBN 0-312-06234-6.
- Wharton, Edith., Introduction to The House of Mirth (1936) in Frederick Wegener, ed. (2000). Uncollected Critical Writings. Princeton, NJ: Princeton University Press pp.265-269.
- Wharton, Edith., Introduction to the 1936 edition of The House of Mirth in Carol J. Singley, ed. (2003). Edith Wharton's The House of Mirth, A Case Book, pp.31-38. New York: Oxford University Press. p. 337. ISBN 0-19-515603-X.
- Wolff, Cynthia Griffin, "Lily Bart and the drama of femininity" in Carol J. Singley, ed. (2003). Edith Wharton's The House of Mirth, A Case Book, pp. 209–228. New York: Oxford University Press. p. 337. ISBN 0-19-515603-X.

== Reviews ==
- Gorra, Michael (2015). "The Portrait of Miss Bart". The New York Review of Books.
- Kornasky, L. (2014). "Edith Wharton in context". Studies in American Naturalism, 9(1), 107.
- Preston, C. (2004). "The critical reception of Edith Wharton". The Yearbook of English Studies, 34(1) Nineteenth-Century Travel Writing,336-338.Accessed: 01-04-2016 03:52 UTC.DOI: 10.2307/3509561
- Singley, C., & Moseley, A. (2007). "Wharton and Cather". American Literary Scholarship, 2007(1), 139-168.
- Wharton, Edith. (1905). "Mr. Sturgis's Belchamber", Bookman, 21(May), 309-310.
