= James W. Tuttleton =

James Welsey Tuttleton (August 19, 1934, in St. Louis, Missouri – November 6, 1998) was the former Dean of the Faculty of Arts and Science and the Faculty of the English Department of New York University (NYU) and also served as Chairman of NYU's English Department and Associate Dean of the Graduate School. He was one of the foremost literary critics of the twentieth century, prominent especially as a "conservative" critic.

Tuttleton provided close critical readings of writers from Poe, Auchincloss, Henry James and Edith Wharton to Sinclair Lewis, Hemingway, Fitzgerald, Wright and Baldwin. He authored the generally well regarded, provocatively entitled "The Primate's Dream" concerning Black authors and literature. Tuttleton was well known for his inspired teaching and wit. Tuttleton was also well known for his work for the New Criterion.
