= Removal of Hell Gate rocks =

Clearing of New York City's East River

Coordinates: 40.7826°N 73.9241°W

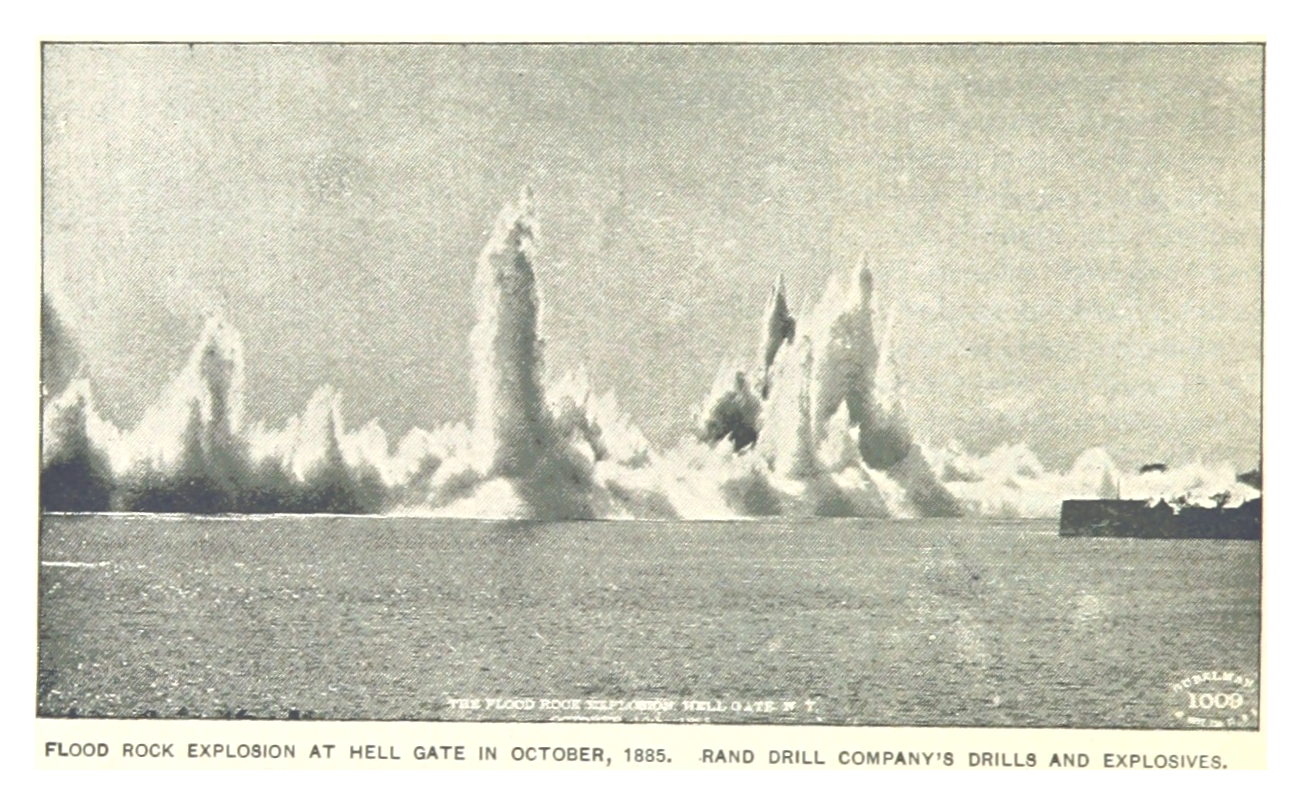
1885 explosion

The removal of obstructive rocks from Hell Gate, a narrow tidal strait in New York City's East River and a major water transportation route, began in 1849, when French engineer Benjamin Maillefert cleared some of the rocks. Then in 1851, the U.S. Army Corps of Engineers, led by General John Newton, began to do the job, in an operation which was to span 70 years. On September 24, 1876, the Corps used 50,000 pounds (23,000 kg) of explosives to blast the rocks, which was followed by further blasting. The process was started by excavating under Hallets reef from Astoria. Cornish miners, assisted by steam drills, dug galleries under the reef, which were then interconnected. They later drilled holes for explosives. A patent was issued for the detonating device. After the explosion, the rock debris was dredged and dropped into a deep part of the river. This was not repeated at the later Flood Rock explosion.

On October 10, 1885, the Corps carried out the largest explosion in this process, annihilating Flood Rock with 300,000 pounds (140,000 kg) of explosives. The blast was felt as far away as Princeton, New Jersey (50 miles or 80 kilometres). It sent a geyser of water 250 feet (76 m) in the air. The blast has been described as "the largest planned explosion before testing began for the atomic bomb", although the detonation at the Battle of Messines in 1917 was larger. Some of the rubble from the detonation was used in 1890 to fill the gap between Great Mill Rock and Little Mill Rock, merging the two islands into a single island, Mill Rock.

== Etymology ==
The name "Hell Gate" is a corruption of the Dutch phrase Hellegat (it first appeared on a Dutch map as Helle Gadt), which could mean either "bright strait" or "clear opening", and it was originally applied to the entirety of the East River. Dutch explorer Adriaen Block, the first European known to have navigated the strait, described it in his journals during his 1614 voyage aboard the Onrust. Hellegat is a fairly common name for waterways in the Low Countries, with at least 20 examples. Because explorers found navigation hazardous in this New World place of rocks and converging tide-driven currents (from the Long Island Sound, Harlem River strait, Upper Bay of New York Harbor, and lesser channels, some of which have been filled), the Anglicization stuck.

== Timeline ==
- 1832: Pot Rock removed, cost $20,000 (equivalent to $645,000 in 2025), depth increased from 18.3 to 20.6 feet (5.6 to 6.3 m)
- 1871: Coenties Reef removed
- 1872: Frying-pan Rock removed
- 1869–1873: Diamond Reef (sometimes "Dimond Reef") removed
- August 1869 – 1876: Reef at Hallett's Point removed
- October 10, 1885: Flood Rock removed
- 1890: Rubble from Flood Rock was used to fill the gap between Great Mill Rock and Little Mill Rock

== Initial efforts ==
The rocks, which impeded ship travel between the Atlantic Ocean through the Long Island Sound to New York City, were off a headland known as Hallett's Point and extended into the East River toward Wards Island. The narrow channel had been a danger to navigators since the area was first explored. Periodically, merchants and other interested parties would try to get something done about the problem. In 1832, the New York State legislature was presented with a petition for a canal to be built through Hallet's Point, thus avoiding Hell Gate altogether. Instead, the legislature responded by providing ships with pilots trained to navigate the shoals. This remained the situation for the next 15 years.

Removing the rocks was mentioned in an 1848 United States Navy report which recommended the destruction of Pot Rock, Frying Pan Rock, and Way's Reef; the first two were smaller, pointed rocks, and Way's Reef was a long ledge. The report also recommended that the middle channel be deepened for civilian use and military defense. Underwater blasting was in its infancy, and early technology was of limited use; cans of powder were placed against the side or top of a rock and detonated with a battery.

In 1849, Benjamin Maillefert, a French engineer whose specialty was underwater blasting, had cleared some of the rocks. Ebenezer Meriam had organized a subscription to pay Maillefert $6,000 to, for instance, reduce "Pot Rock" to provide 24 feet (7.3 m) of depth at low-mean water. Because ships continued to run aground – in the 1850s about 2% of ships did so – and petitions continued to call for action, the federal government undertook surveys of the area which ended in 1851 with a detailed and accurate map. By then Maillefert had cleared the rock "Baldheaded Billy", and it was reported that Pot Rock had been reduced to 20.5 feet (6.2 m), which encouraged the United States Congress to appropriate $20,000 for the Army Corps of Engineers to further clear the strait, but the money was soon spent without appreciable change. Indeed, a more accurate survey showed that the depth of Pot Rock was actually a little more than 18 feet (5.5 m).

With the main shipping channels into New York through The Narrows into New York Harbor silting up with sand due to littoral drift, thus providing ships with less depth to travel through, and a new generation of larger ships coming online – epitomized by Isambard Kingdom Brunel's SS Great Eastern, popularly known as "Leviathan" – New York began to be concerned that it would start to lose its status as a great port if a "back door" entrance into the harbor was not created. In 1850, the harbor commission said that the mean water low of the main channel was 24 feet (7.3 m) and the extreme water low was 23 feet (7.0 m). In the 1850s the depth of the main channel continued to lessen and the draft required by the new ships continued to increase, meaning it was only safe for them to enter the harbor at high tide. An advisory council recommended in 1856 that Hell Gate be cleared of all obstacles, but nothing was done, and the Civil War soon broke out.

== After the Civil War ==
After the Civil War, in the late 1860s, Congress belatedly realized the military importance of having easily navigable waterways, and charged the Army Corps of Engineers with clearing Hell Gate of the rocks there that caused a danger to navigation. According to a January 1867 Corps report, deepening the channel from 18.3 to 20.6 feet (5.6 to 6.3 m) would cost $18,000, about half the cost of the annual loss in shipping.

A steam-powered drilling scow, with a 32-foot (9.8 m) hole to accommodate 21 drills, was used to remove the rocks in the middle of the channel. It was first used on Diamond Reef in the spring of 1869; a number of holes were drilled into the rock, into which 30-to-35-pound (14 to 16 kg) charges of nitroglycerin were inserted. Coenties Reef followed in 1871 with 17 surface blasts, and 39 surface blasts two years later; it was broken up with 17,127 pounds (7,769 kg) of nitroglycerin. Congress failed to include Diamond Reef in its 1875 appropriation, and debris removal was suspended. The scow was towed to Frying Pan Rock in 1872, where 11 surface blasts were made.

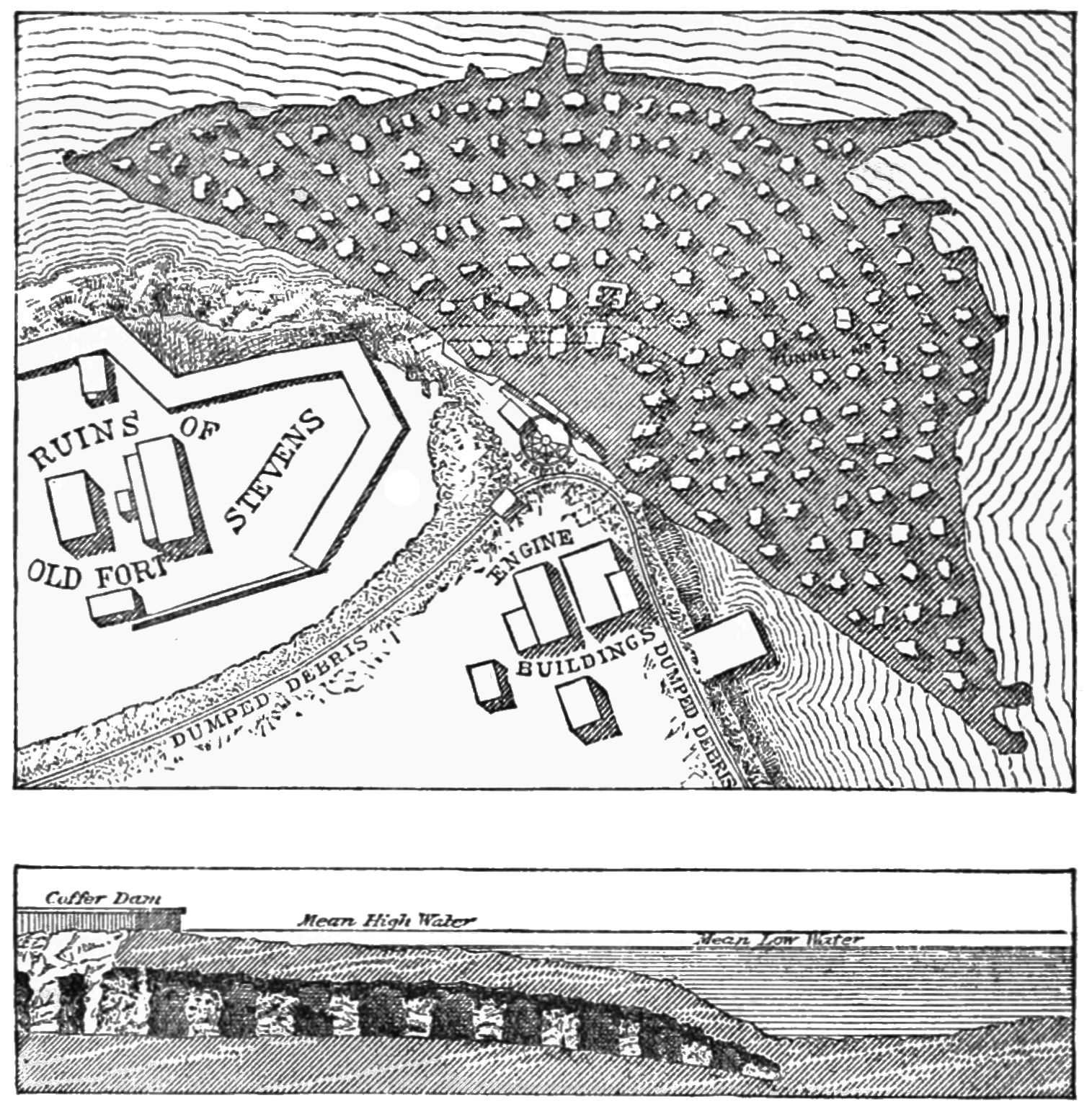
The excavations and tunnels used to undermine Hallet's Point

Removal of the Hallett's Point reef began in August 1869; the reef was an irregular semi-ellipse about 770 by 300 feet (235 by 91 m). Producing eddies on both sides (influenced by tidal currents), it was a danger to shipping. A wood cofferdam was fastened to the rocks, and the water was pumped out about to accommodate a shaft; work was then suspended because its funding had run out. Work resumed in July 1870, and the shaft was sunk to 33 feet (10 m) below mean low water. The rock was hand-drilled that year, with 8,306 cubic yards (6,350 m^{3}) removed. Steam-powered equipment was added the following year, speeding up the work. Thirty thousand cubic yards of underwater broken stone were removed by dredging.

A scale model of the excavation was exhibited at Philadelphia's 1876 Centennial Exposition.

The Hallet's Point reef's upper surface was surveyed in detail in 1871. Several explosives were tested. That year's appropriation was $225,000, half the amount requested. The following year, $600,000 was requested, less than half of which was granted. Work was suspended in mid-November 1873 due to lack of funds, although the excavation was nearly completed. A chain of explosions was planned which would minimize vibration in nearby Astoria, and on Ward's and Blackwell's Islands. After blasting, the rocks were hauled by a mule-driven wagon to dump cars.

=== 1876 explosion ===
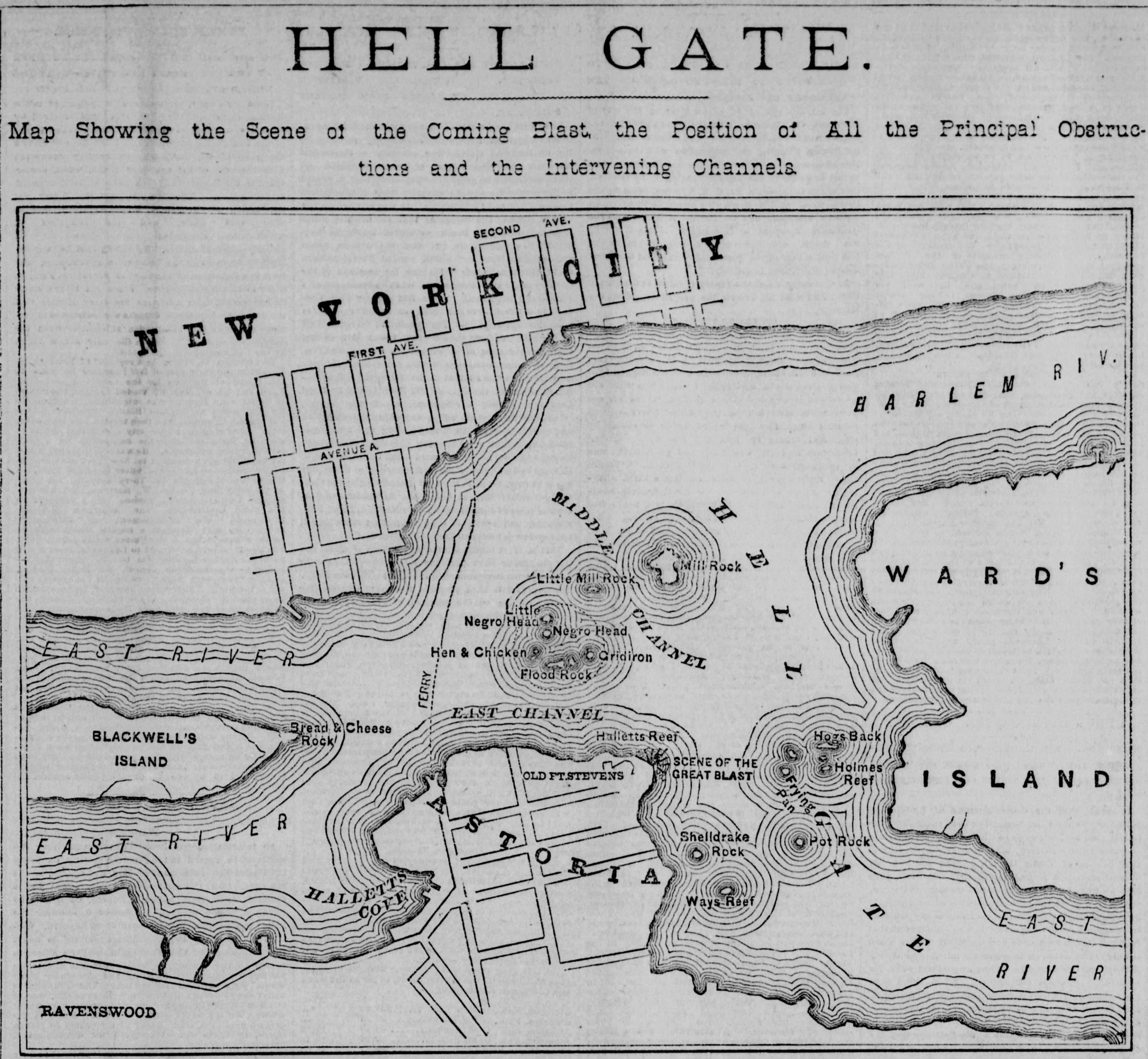
Map of Hell Gate published prior to the 1876 blast

Until mid-1874, nitroglycerin had been principally used for blasting purposes; mica powder, giant powder, rend-rock, and vulcan powder (all nitroglycerin compounds) were also used. None were as powerful as nitroglycerin, but were less expensive. After the holes were charged with tin canisters, priming charges in brass tubes were inserted. Brass was preferred to tin because of its greater durability in salt water and better protection against leakage. The primers also contained groups of 20 fuses as detonators. The connecting wires were 18-gauge copper (1.1 mm), insulated with guttapercha, for a total diameter of 9 gauge (2.9 mm). The lead and return wires were 12-gauge (2.1 mm), insulated with two coats of guttapercha, for a total size of 4 gauge (5.2 mm).

The batteries were 40, 43, and 44 zinc-and-carbon cells, divided into 23 batteries. Each battery would fire 160 fuses in a divided circuit: eight groups of 20 each. The explosion began shortly after 2:50 p.m. on September 24, 1876. There was no damaging shock in the air, the water, or underground. The spray and gases reached a height of 123 feet (37 m), but no windows broke.

The underground shock was minor, but was felt in Manhattan and Brooklyn. Some plastering was dislodged from a ceiling in a house 150 yards (140 m) and in two houses 6,000 yards (5.5 km) from the site. One lesson learned from the detonation was that moderate charges, confined in rock and cushioned by water, would not damage surrounding objects.

== See also ==
- East River
- Ripple Rock – Seamount in the Seymour Narrows, British Columbia, Canada; blown up in 1958
