= Mill Rock =

Island in New York City

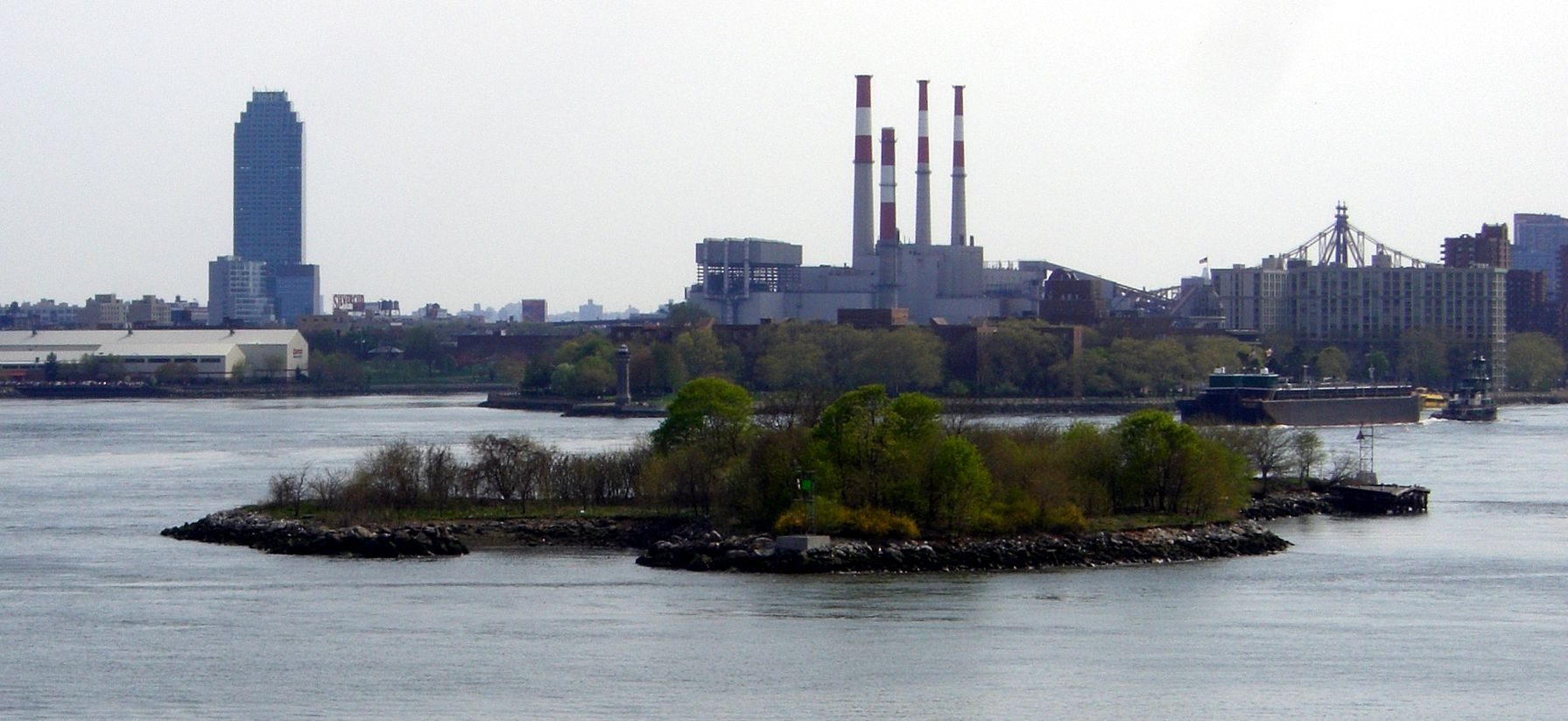
- Mill Rock as seen from Wards Island Bridge. The Citicorp Building and Ravenswood Generating Station are visible in the background.

- Location within New York City

Geography
- Location: East River, New York County, New York, USA
- Coordinates: 40.7807°N 73.9384°W
- Area: 3.5 ha (8.6 acres)

Administration
- United States
- State: New York
- City: New York City
- Borough: Manhattan

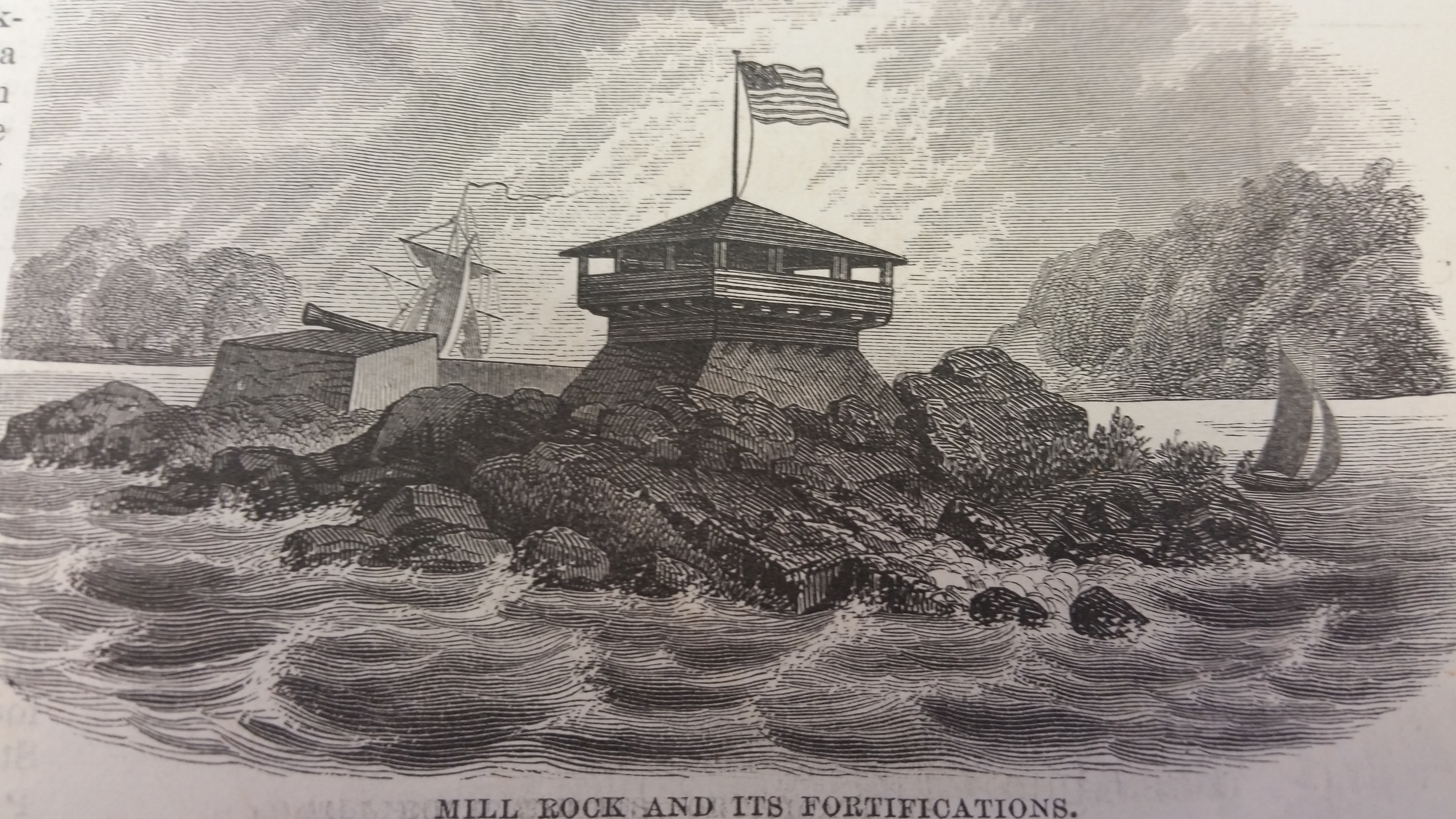
Mill Rock fort

Mill Rock is a small uninhabited island between Manhattan Island and Queens in New York City. The island belongs to the borough of Manhattan. It lies about 1,000 feet (300 m) off Manhattan's East 96th Street, south of Randalls and Wards Islands, where the East River and Harlem River converge. Mill Rock is located at Hell Gate, formerly an infamously treacherous area for ships to pass.

== History ==
The island was originally two smaller islands when William Hallet bought them from the local tribes in 1664. In 1701, John Marsh built a mill on one of them and the islands came to be called Great Mill Rock and Little Mill Rock.

During the War of 1812, the War Department built a blockhouse with two cannons on Great Mill Rock as part of Fort Stevens. This fortification was part of a chain of blockhouses that was intended to defend New York Harbor and protect the passage into Long Island Sound against the British Navy.

The island was later squatted by Sandy Gibson, who operated a farm there from 1840 to 1898.

The United States Army Corps of Engineers started clearing rocks from Hell Gate in the late 19th century. In 1885, USACE detonated 300,000 lb (136,000 kg) of explosives on adjoining Flood Rock; that island had been the most treacherous impediment to East River shipping. It was, most likely, the most forceful explosion in New York City's history at the time; it was felt as far away as Princeton, New Jersey. The explosion has been described as "the largest planned explosion before testing began for the atomic bomb", although the detonation at the Battle of Messines in 1917 was larger. In 1890 the Flood Island remnants were used to fill the space between Great and Little Mill Rocks, producing Mill Rock.

== Mill Rock Park ==
The island is owned by the City of New York and maintained by the New York City Department of Parks and Recreation as Mill Rock Park. There is a dock on the southern shore of the island but it has not been open to the public since the 1960s, when there were public events, and it has since been allowed to return to its state of shrubbery. Since about 2008, the island has been home to a nesting colony of black-crowned night herons, great egrets, snowy egrets, great black-backed gulls, fish crows, and double-crested cormorants. The herons and egrets are thought to have moved to Mill Rock from nearby North Brother Island.
