= East River =

Navigable tidal strait in New York City

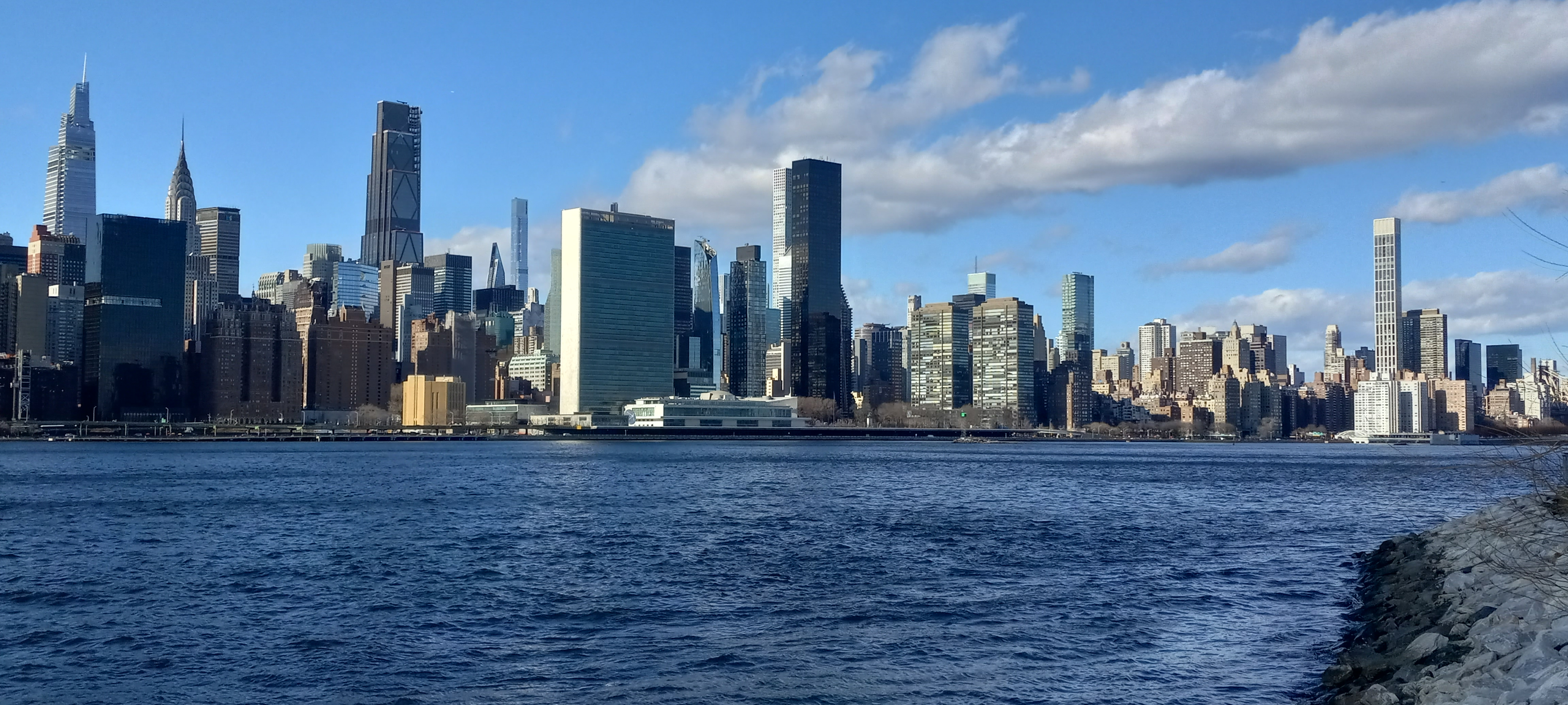
- East River (foreground) and the headquarters of the United Nations in Midtown Manhattan (background) seen from Long Island City in February 2025

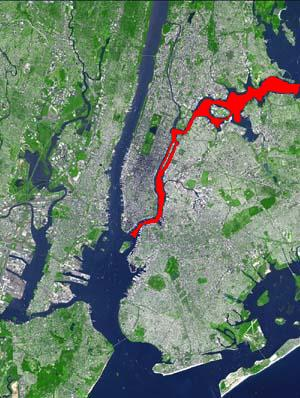
- Aerial map of New York City with the East River shown in red

Location
- Country: (United States)
- State: (New York (state))
- City: New York City

Physical characteristics
- Source: Long Island Sound
  - coordinates: 40.800°N 73.785°W
- Mouth: Upper New York Bay
  - coordinates: 40.700°N 74.005°W
- Length: 16 mi (26 km)

Basin features
- Tributaries
  - left: Newtown Creek, Flushing River
  - right: Westchester Creek, Bronx River, Bronx Kill, Harlem River

The East River is a saltwater tidal estuary in New York City. The waterway, which despite its name is a tidal strait, not a river, connects Upper New York Bay on its south end to Long Island Sound on its north end. It separates the boroughs of Brooklyn and Queens on Long Island from Manhattan Island and the Bronx, which is on the mainland.

Because of its connection to Long Island Sound, the East River was once also known as the Sound River. The strait changes its direction of flow regularly, and is subject to strong fluctuations in its current, which are accentuated by its narrowness and variety of depths. The waterway is navigable for its entire length of 16 miles (26 km), and was historically the center of maritime activities in the city.

== Formation and description ==
Technically a drowned valley, like the other waterways around New York City, the strait was formed approximately 11,000 years ago at the end of the Wisconsin glaciation. The distinct change in the shape of the strait between the lower and upper portions is evidence of this glacial activity. The upper portion (from Long Island Sound to Hell Gate), running largely perpendicular to the glacial motion, is wide, meandering, and has deep narrow bays on both banks, scoured out by the glacier's movement. The lower portion (from Hell Gate to New York Bay) runs north–south, parallel to the glacial motion. It is much narrower, with straight banks. The bays that exist, as well as those that used to exist before being filled in by human activity, are largely wide and shallow.

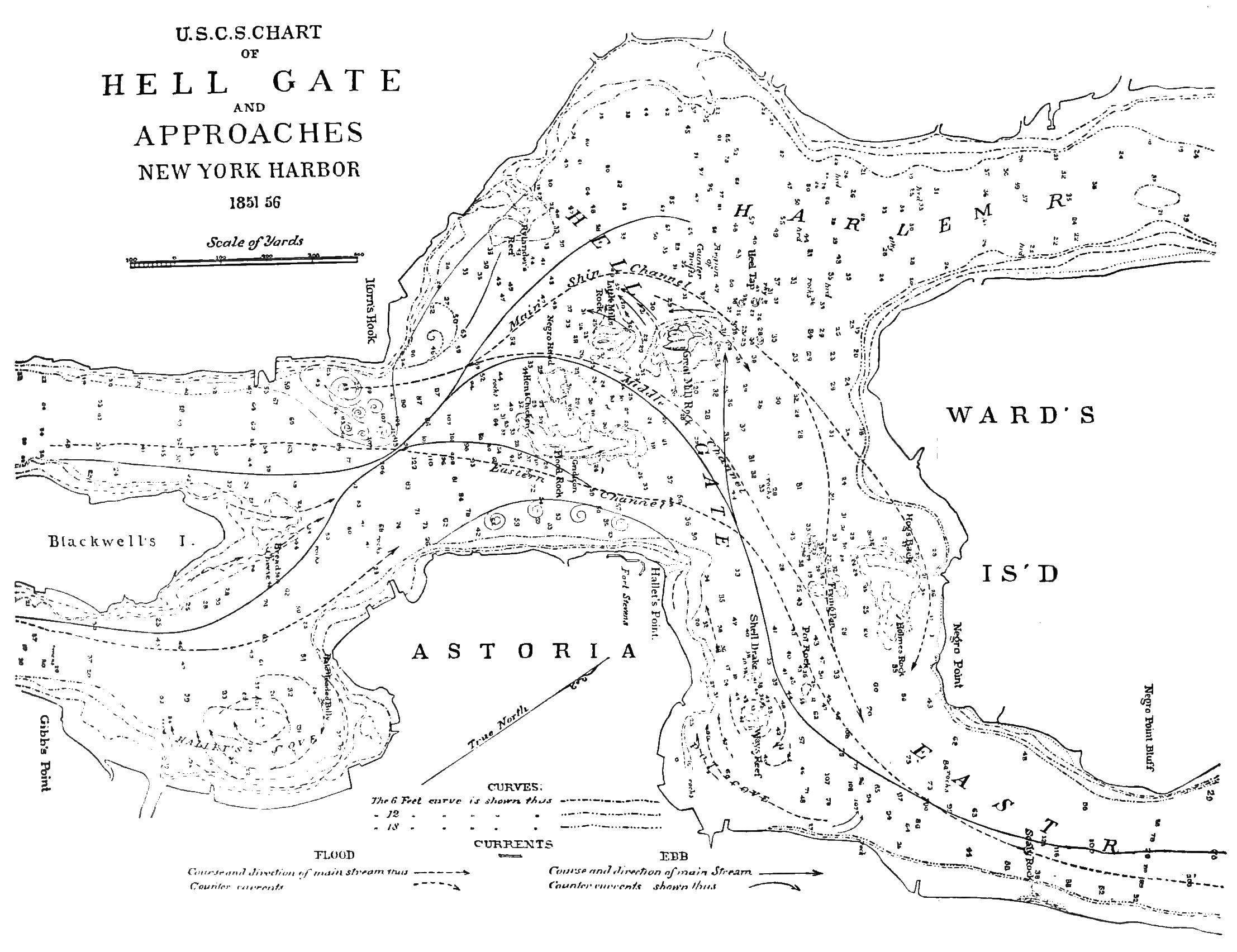
A navigation map for Hell Gate from c. 1885, after many of the obstructions had been removed

The section known as "Hell Gate" – from the Dutch name Hellegat meaning either "bright strait" or "clear opening", given to the entire river in 1614 by explorer Adriaen Block when he passed through it in his ship Tyger – is a narrow, turbulent, and particularly treacherous stretch of the river. Tides from the Long Island Sound, New York Harbor and the Harlem River meet there, making it difficult to navigate, especially because of the number of rocky islets which once dotted it, with names such as "Frying Pan", "Pot, Bread and Cheese", "Hen and Chicken", "Heel Top"; "Flood"; and "Gridiron", roughly 12 islets and reefs in all, all of which led to a number of shipwrecks, including HMS Hussar, a British frigate that sank in 1780 while supposedly carrying gold and silver intended to pay British troops. The stretch has since been cleared of rocks and widened. Washington Irving wrote of Hell Gate that the current sounded "like a bull bellowing for more drink" at half tide, while at full tide it slept "as soundly as an alderman after dinner". He said it was like "a peaceable fellow enough when he has no liquor at all, or when he has a skinful, but who, when half-seas over, plays the very devil." The tidal regime is complex, with the two major tides – from the Long Island Sound and from the Atlantic Ocean – separated by about two hours; and this is without consideration of the tidal influence of the Harlem River, all of which creates a "dangerous cataract", as one ship's captain put it.

The river is navigable for its entire length of 16 miles (26 km). In 1939 it was reported that the stretch from The Battery to the former Brooklyn Navy Yard near Wallabout Bay, a run of about 1,000 yards (910 m), was 40 feet (12 m) deep, the long section from there, running to the west of Roosevelt Island, through Hell Gate and to Throg's Neck was at least 35 feet (11 m) deep, and then eastward from there the river was, at mean low tide, 168 feet (51 m) deep.

The broadness of the river's channel south of Roosevelt Island is caused by the dipping of the hardy Fordham gneiss underlying the island under the less strong Inwood marble which lies under the river bed. Why the river turns to the east as it approaches the three lower Manhattan bridges is geologically unknown.

=== Islands ===
Roosevelt Island, a long (2-mile (3.2 km)) and narrow (800 feet (240 m)) landmass, lies in the stretch of the river between Manhattan Island and the borough of Queens, roughly from the latitude of Manhattan's East 46th to 86th Streets. Nowadays named after an American president, in the 18th century it was called Blackwell Island. It splits the strait into the West Channel, dividing it from Manhattan, and the East Channel, dividing it from Long Island. The abrupt termination of the island on its north end is due to an extension of the 125th Street Fault. Politically, the island's 147 acres (0.59 km^{2}) constitute part of the borough of Manhattan. It is connected to Queens by the Roosevelt Island Bridge, to Manhattan by the Roosevelt Island Tramway, and to both boroughs by a subway station served by the F train. The Queensboro Bridge also runs across Roosevelt Island, and an elevator allowing both pedestrian and vehicular access to the island was added to the bridge in 1930, but elevator service was discontinued in 1955 following the opening of the Roosevelt Island Bridge, and the elevator was demolished in 1970. The island, which was formerly known as Blackwell's Island and Welfare Island before being renamed in honor of US President Franklin D. Roosevelt, historically served as the site of a penitentiary and a number of hospitals; today, it is dominated by residential neighborhoods consisting of large apartment buildings and parkland (much of which is dotted with the ruins of older structures).

The largest land mass in the river south of Roosevelt Island is U Thant Island, an artificial islet created during the construction of the Steinway Tunnel (which currently serves the subway's 7 and <7> lines). Officially named Belmont Island after one of the tunnel's financiers, the landmass owes its popular name (after Burmese diplomat U Thant, former Secretary-General of the United Nations) to the efforts of a group associated with the guru Sri Chinmoy that held mediation meetings on the island in the 1970s. Today, the island is owned by New York State and serves as a migratory bird sanctuary that is closed to visitors.

Proceeding north and east from Roosevelt Island, the River's principal islands include Manhattan's Mill Rock, an 8.6-acre (3.5 ha) island located about 1000 feet from Manhattan's East 96th Street; Manhattan's 520-acre Randalls and Wards Islands, two formerly separate islands joined by landfill that are home to a large public park, a number of public institutions, and the supports for the Triborough and the Hell Gate Bridges; the Bronx's Rikers Island, once under 100 acres (0.40 km^{2}) but now over 400 acres (1.6 km^{2}) following extensive landfill expansion after the island's 1884 purchase by the city as a prison farm and still home to New York City's massive and controversial primary jail complex; and North and South Brother Islands, both of which also constitute part of the Bronx.

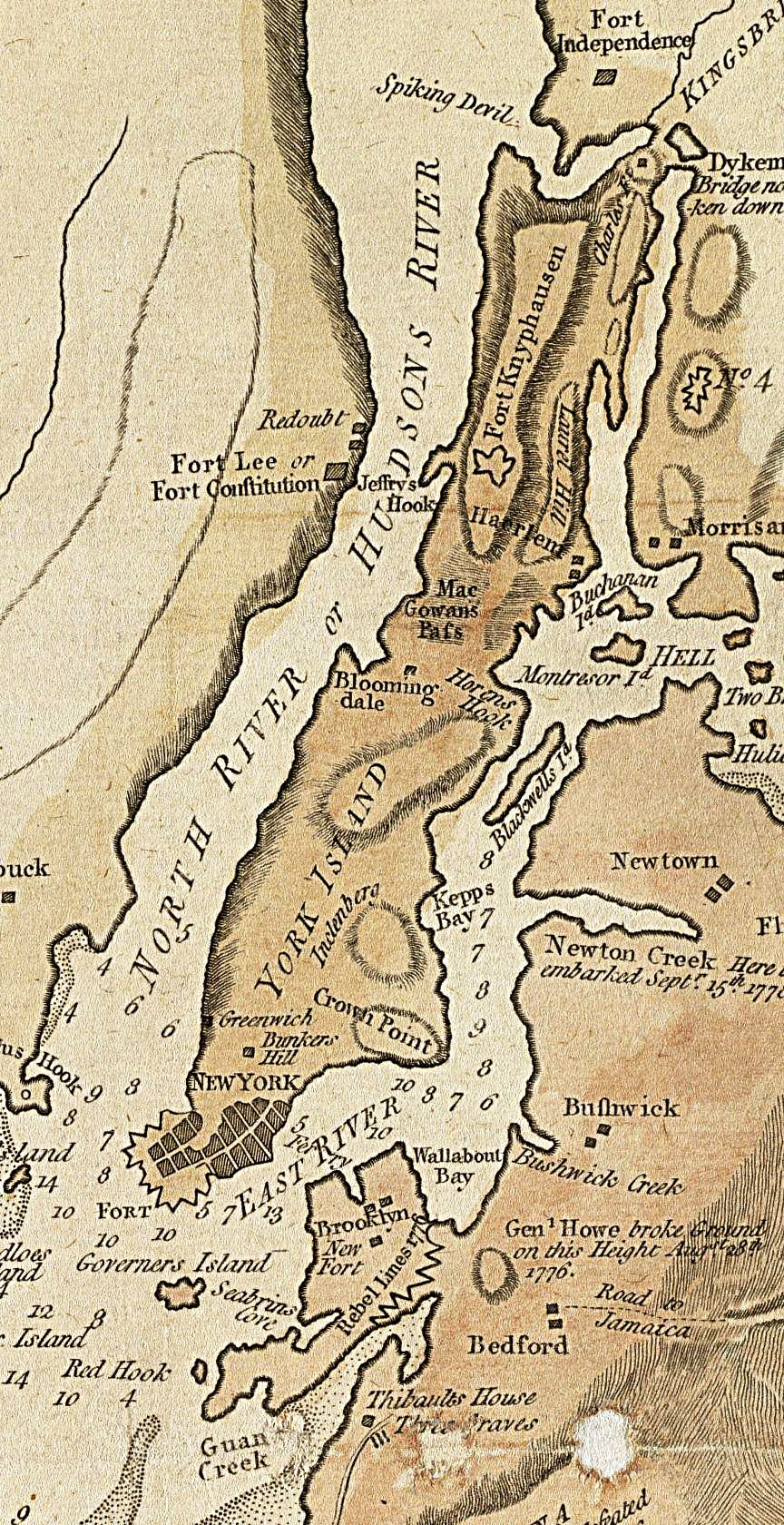
A map from the 18th century

=== Tributaries ===
The Bronx River, Pugsley Creek, and Westchester Creek drain into the northern bank of the East River in the northern section of the strait. The Flushing River, historically known as Flushing Creek, empties into the strait's southern bank near LaGuardia Airport via Flushing Bay. Further west, Luyster Creek drains into the East River in Astoria, Queens.

North of Randalls Island, it is joined by the Bronx Kill. Along the east of Wards Island, at approximately the strait's midpoint, it narrows into a channel called Hell Gate, which is spanned by both the Robert F. Kennedy Bridge (formerly the Triborough), and the Hell Gate Bridge. On the south side of Wards Island, it is joined by the Harlem River.

Newtown Creek on Long Island, which itself contained several tributaries, drains into the East River and forms part of the boundary between Queens and Brooklyn. Bushwick Inlet and Wallabout Bay on Long Island also drain into the strait on the Long Island side. The Gowanus Canal was built from Gowanus Creek, which emptied into the river.

Historically, there were other small streams which emptied into the river, though these and their associated wetlands have been filled in and built over. These small streams included the Harlem Creek, one of the most significant tributaries originating in Manhattan. Other streams that emptied into the East River included the Sawkill in Manhattan, Mill Brook in the Bronx, and Sunswick Creek in Queens.

== History ==
Prior to the arrival of Europeans, the land north of the East River was occupied by the Siwanoys, one of many groups of Algonquin-speaking Lenapes in the area. Those of the Lenapes who lived in the northern part of Manhattan Island in a campsite known as Konaande Kongh used a landing at around the current location of East 119th street to paddle into the river in canoes fashioned from tree trunks in order to fish.

Dutch settlement of what became New Amsterdam began in 1623. Some of the earliest of the small settlements in the area were along the west bank of the East River on sites that had previously been Native American settlements. As with the Native Americans, the river was central to their lives for transportation for trading and for fishing. They gathered marsh grass to feed their cattle, and the East River's tides helped to power mills which ground grain to flour. By 1642 there was a ferry running on the river between Manhattan Island and what is now Brooklyn, and the first pier on the river was built in 1647 at Pearl and Broad Streets. After the British took over the colony in 1664, which was renamed "New York", the development of the waterfront continued, and a shipbuilding industry grew up once New York started exporting flour. By the end of the 17th century, the Great Dock, located at Corlear's Hook on the East River, had been built.

=== Narrowing the river ===
Historically, the lower portion of the strait, which separates Manhattan from Brooklyn, was one of the busiest and most important channels in the world, particularly during the first three centuries of New York City's history. Because the water along the lower Manhattan shoreline was too shallow for large boats to tie up and unload their goods, from 1686 on – after the signing of the Dongan Charter, which allowed intertidal land to be owned and sold – the shoreline was "wharfed out" to the high-water mark by constructing retaining walls that were filled in with every conceivable kind of landfill: excrement, dead animals, ships deliberately sunk in place, ship ballast, and muck dredged from the bottom of the river. On the new land were built warehouses and other structures necessary for the burgeoning sea trade. Many of the "water-lot" grants went to the rich and powerful families of the merchant class, although some went to tradesmen. By 1700, the Manhattan bank of the river had been "wharfed-out" up to around Whitehall Street, narrowing the strait of the river.

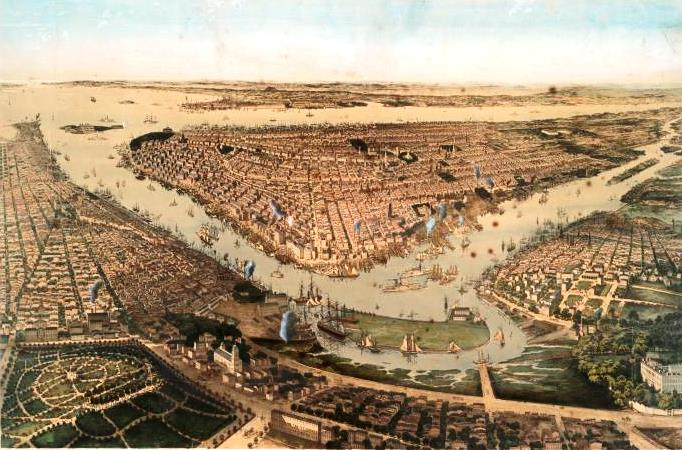
A "bird's-eye" view of New York City from 1859; Wallabout Bay and the East River are in the foreground, the Hudson River and New York Bay in the background.

After the signing of the Montgomerie Charter in the late 1720s, another 127 acres of land along the Manhattan shore of the East River was authorized to be filled-in, this time to a point 400 feet beyond the low-water mark; the parts that had already been expanded to the low water mark – much of which had been devastated by a coastal storm in the early 1720s and a nor'easter in 1723 – were also expanded, narrowing the channel even further. What had been quiet beach land was to become new streets and buildings, and the core of the city's sea-borne trade. This infilling went as far north as Corlear's Hook. In addition, the city was given control of the western shore of the river from Wallabout Bay south.

=== American Revolution ===
Expansion of the waterfront halted during the American Revolution, in which the East River played an important role early in the conflict. On August 28, 1776, while British and Hessian troops rested after besting the Americans at the Battle of Long Island, General George Washington was rounding up all the boats on the east shore of the river, in what is now Brooklyn, and used them to successfully move his troops across the river – under cover of night, rain, and fog – to Manhattan island, before the British could press their advantage. Thus, though the battle was a victory for the British, the failure of Sir William Howe to destroy the Continental Army when he had the opportunity allowed the Americans to continue fighting. Without the stealthy withdrawal across the East River, the American Revolution might have ended much earlier.

Wallabout Bay on the river was the site of most of the British prison ships – most notoriously HMS Jersey – where thousands of American prisoners of war were held in terrible conditions. These prisoners had come into the hands of the British after the fall of New York City on September 15, 1776, after the American loss at the Battle of Long Island and the loss of Fort Washington on November 16. Prisoners began to be housed on the broken-down warships and transports in December; about 24 ships were used in total, but generally only 5 or 6 at a time. Almost twice as many Americans died from neglect in these ships than did from all the battles in the war: as many as 12,000 soldiers, sailors and civilians. The bodies were thrown overboard or were buried in shallow graves on the riverbanks, but their bones – some of which were collected when they washed ashore – were later relocated and are now inside the Prison Ship Martyrs' Monument in nearby Fort Greene Park. The existence of the ships and the conditions the men were held in was widely known at the time through letters, diaries and memoirs, and was a factor not only in the attitude of Americans toward the British, but in the negotiations to formally end the war.

=== Development begins again ===
After the war, East River waterfront development continued once more. New York State legislation, which in 1807 had authorized what would become the Commissioners Plan of 1811, authorized the creation of new land out to 400 feet from the low water mark into the river, and with the advent of gridded streets along the new waterline – Joseph Mangin had laid out such a grid in 1803 in his A Plan and Regulation of the City of New York, which was rejected by the city, but established the concept – the coastline become regularized at the same time that the strait became even narrower.

One result of the narrowing of the East River along the shoreline of Manhattan and, later, Brooklyn – which continued until the mid-19th century when the state put a stop to it – was an increase in the speed of its current. Buttermilk Channel, the strait that divides Governors Island from Red Hook in Brooklyn, and which is located directly south of the "mouth" of the East River, was in the early 17th century a fordable waterway across which cattle could be driven. Further investigation by Colonel Jonathan Williams determined that the channel was by 1776 three fathoms deep (18 feet (5.5 m)), five fathoms deep (30 feet (9.1 m)) in the same spot by 1798, and when surveyed by Williams in 1807 had deepened to 7 fathoms (42 feet (13 m)) at low tide. What had been almost a bridge between two landforms that were once connected had become a fully navigable channel, thanks to the constriction of the East River and the increased flow it caused. Soon, the current in the East River had become so strong that larger ships had to use auxiliary steam power in order to turn. The continued narrowing of the channel on both side may have been the reasoning behind the suggestion of one New York State Senator, who wanted to fill in the East River and annex Brooklyn, with the cost of doing so being covered by selling the newly made land. Others proposed a dam at Roosevelt Island (then Blackwell's Island) to create a wet basin for shipping.

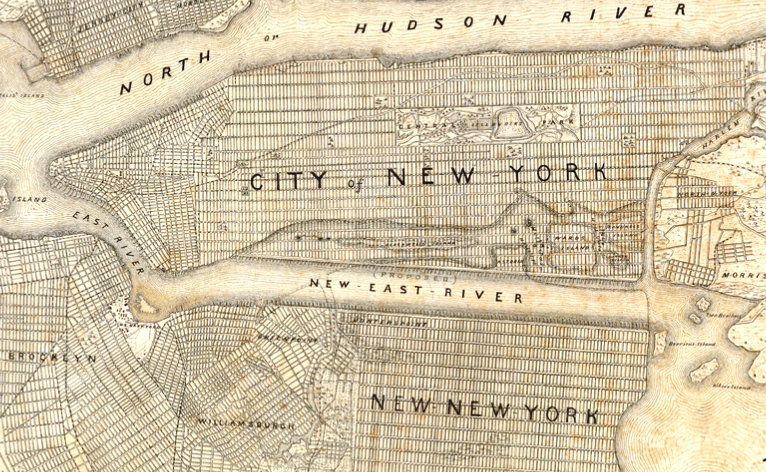
James E. Serrell's 1860s plan for an expanded Manhattan and a straightened East River, using canalization and land reclamation

=== Filling in the river ===
Filling in part of the river was also proposed in 1867 by engineer James E. Serrell, later a city surveyor, but with emphasis on solving the problem of Hell Gate. Serrell proposed filling in Hell Gate and building a "New East River" through Queens with an extension to Westchester County. Serrell's plan – which he publicized with maps, essay and lectures as well as presentations to the city, state and federal governments – would have filled in the river from 14th Street to 125th Street. The New East River through Queens would be about three times the average width of the existing one at an even 3,600 feet (1,100 m) throughout, and would run as straight as an arrow for five miles (8.0 km). The new land, and the portions of Queens which would become part of Manhattan, adding 2,500 acres (1,000 ha), would be covered with an extension of the existing street grid of Manhattan.

Variations on Serrell's plan would be floated over the years. A pseudonymous "Terra Firma" brought up filling in the East River again in the Evening Post and Scientific American in 1904, and Thomas Alva Edison took it up in 1906. Then Thomas Kennard Thompson, a bridge and railway engineer, proposed in 1913 to fill in the river from Hell Gate to the tip of Manhattan and, as Serrell had suggested, make a new canalized East River, only this time from Flushing Bay to Jamaica Bay. He would also expand Brooklyn into the Upper Harbor, put up a dam from Brooklyn to Staten Island, and make extensive landfill in the Lower Bay. At around the same time, in the 1920s, John A. Harriss, New York City's chief traffic engineer, who had developed the first traffic signals in the city, also had plans for the river. Harriss wanted to dam the East River at Hell Gate and the Williamsburg Bridge, then remove the water, put a roof over it on stilts, and build boulevards and pedestrian lanes on the roof along with "majestic structures", with transportation services below. The East River's course would, once again, be shifted to run through Queens, and this time Brooklyn as well, to channel it to the harbor.

=== Clearing Hell Gate ===
Periodically, merchants and other interested parties would try to get something done about the difficulty of navigating through Hell Gate. In 1832, the New York State legislature was presented with a petition for a canal to be built through nearby Hallet's Point, thus avoiding Hell Gate altogether. Instead, the legislature responded by providing ships with pilots trained to navigate the shoals for the next 15 years.

In 1849, a French engineer whose specialty was underwater blasting, Benjamin Maillefert, had cleared some of the rocks which, along with the mix of tides, made the Hell Gate stretch of the river so dangerous to navigate. Ebenezer Meriam had organized a subscription to pay Maillefert $6,000 to, for instance, reduce "Pot Rock" to provide 24 feet (7.3 m) of depth at low-mean water. While ships continued to run aground (in the 1850s about 2% of ships did so) and petitions continued to call for action, the federal government undertook surveys of the area which ended in 1851 with a detailed and accurate map. By then Maillefert had cleared the rock "Baldheaded Billy", and it was reported that Pot Rock had been reduced to 20.5 feet (6.2 m), which encouraged the United States Congress to appropriate $20,000 for further clearing of the strait. However, a more accurate survey showed that the depth of Pot Rock was actually a little more than 18 feet (5.5 m), and eventually Congress withdrew its funding.

With the main shipping channels through The Narrows into the harbor silting up with sand due to littoral drift, thus providing ships with less depth, and a new generation of larger ships coming online – epitomized by Isambard Kingdom Brunel's SS Great Eastern, popularly known as "Leviathan" – New York began to be concerned that it would start to lose its status as a great port if a "back door" entrance into the harbor was not created. In the 1850s the depth continued to lessen – the harbor commission said in 1850 that the mean water low was 24 feet (7.3 m) and the extreme water low was 23 feet (7.0 m) – while the draft required by the new ships continued to increase, meaning it was only safe for them to enter the harbor at high tide.

The U.S. Congress, realizing that the problem needed to be addressed, appropriated $20,000 for the Army Corps of Engineers (USACE) to continue Maillefert's work. In 1851, USACE, "under Lt. Bartlett of the Army Corps of Engineers", began to do the job, in an operation which was to span 70 years. The appropriated money was soon spent without appreciable change in the hazards of navigating the strait. An advisory council recommended in 1856 that the strait be cleared of all obstacles, but nothing was done, and the Civil War soon broke out.

==== After the Civil War ====
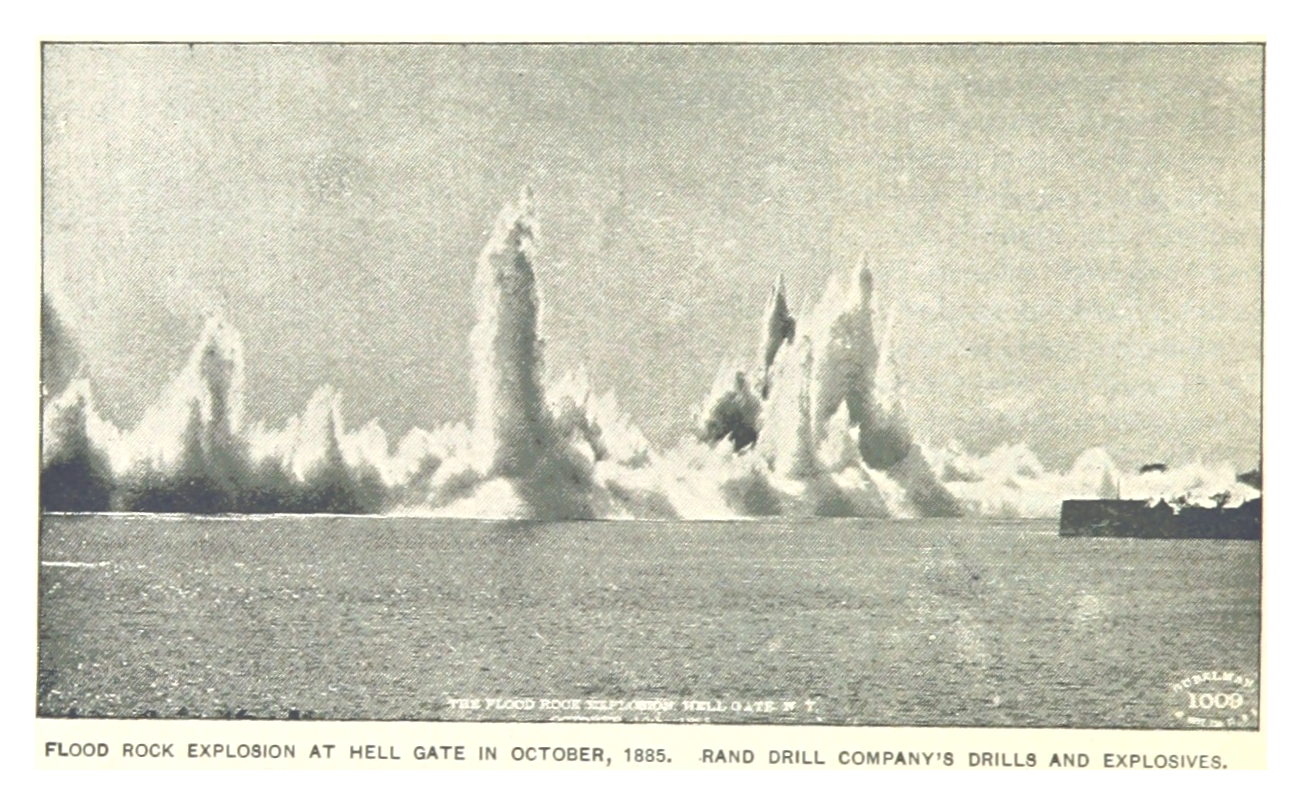
The 1885 explosion

In the late 1860s, after the Civil War, Congress realized the military importance of having easily navigable waterways, and charged the Army Corps of Engineers with clearing Hell Gate. Newton estimated that the operation would cost about half as much as the annual losses in shipping. The 2021 book by Thomas Barthel titled Opening the East River: John Newton and the Blasting of Hell Gate traces Newton's work on this project from 1866 to 1885. On September 24, 1876, the Corps used 50,000 pounds (23,000 kg) of explosives to blast the rocks, which was followed by further blasting. The process was started by excavating under Hallets reef from Astoria. Cornish miners, assisted by steam drills, dug galleries under the reef, which were then interconnected. They later drilled holes for explosives. A patent was issued for the detonating device. After the explosion, the rock debris was dredged and dropped into a deep part of the river. This was not repeated at the later Flood Rock explosion.

On October 10, 1885, the Corps carried out the largest explosion in this process, annihilating Flood Rock with 300,000 pounds (140,000 kg) of explosives. The blast was felt as far away as Princeton, New Jersey (50 miles). It sent a geyser of water 250 feet (76 m) in the air. The blast has been described as "the largest planned explosion before testing began for the atomic bomb", although the detonation at the Battle of Messines in 1917 was larger. Some of the rubble from the detonation was used in 1890 to fill the gap between Great Mill Rock and Little Mill Rock, merging the two islands into a single island, Mill Rock.

At the same time that Hell Gate was being cleared, the Harlem River Ship Canal was being planned. When it was completed in 1895, the "back door" to New York's center of ship-borne trade in the docks and warehouses of the East River was open from two directions, through the cleared East River, and from the Hudson River through the Harlem River to the East River. Ironically, though, while both forks of the northern shipping entrance to the city were now open, modern dredging techniques had cut through the sandbars of the Atlantic Ocean entrance, allowing new, even larger ships to use that traditional passage into New York's docks.

At the beginning of the 19th century, the East River was the center of New York's shipping industry, but by the end of the century, much of it had moved to the Hudson River, leaving the East River wharves and slips to begin a long process of decay, until the area was finally rehabilitated in the mid-1960s, and the South Street Seaport Museum was opened in 1967.

=== A new seawall ===
By 1870, the condition of the Port of New York along both the East and Hudson Rivers had so deteriorated that the New York State legislature created the Department of Docks to renovate the port and keep New York competitive with other ports on the American East Coast. The Department of Docks was given the task of creating the master plan for the waterfront, and General George B. McClellan was engaged to head the project. McClellan held public hearings and invited plans to be submitted, ultimately receiving 70 of them, although in the end he and his successors put his own plan into effect. That plan called for the building of a seawall around Manhattan island from West 61st Street on the Hudson, around The Battery, and up to East 51st Street on the East River. The area behind the masonry wall (mostly concrete but in some parts granite blocks) would be filled in with landfill, and wide streets would be laid down on the new land. In this way, a new edge for the island (or at least the part of it used as a commercial port) would be created.

The department had surveyed 13,700 feet (4,200 m) of shoreline by 1878, as well as documenting the currents and tides. By 1900, 75 miles (121 km) had been surveyed and core samples had been taken to inform the builders of how deep the bedrock was. The work was completed just as World War I began, allowing the Port of New York to be a major point of embarkation for troops and materiel.

The new seawall helps protect Manhattan island from storm surges, although it is only 5 feet (1.5 m) above the mean sea level, so that particularly dangerous storms, such as the nor'easter of 1992 and Hurricane Sandy in 2012, which hit the city in a way to create surges which are much higher, can still do significant damage. (The Hurricane of September 3, 1821, created the biggest storm surge on record in New York City: a rise of 13 feet (4.0 m) in one hour at the Battery, flooding all of lower Manhattan up to Canal Street.) Still, the new seawall begun in 1871 gave the island a firmer edge, improved the quality of the port, and continues to protect Manhattan from normal storm surges.

=== Bridges and tunnels ===
See also: § Crossings

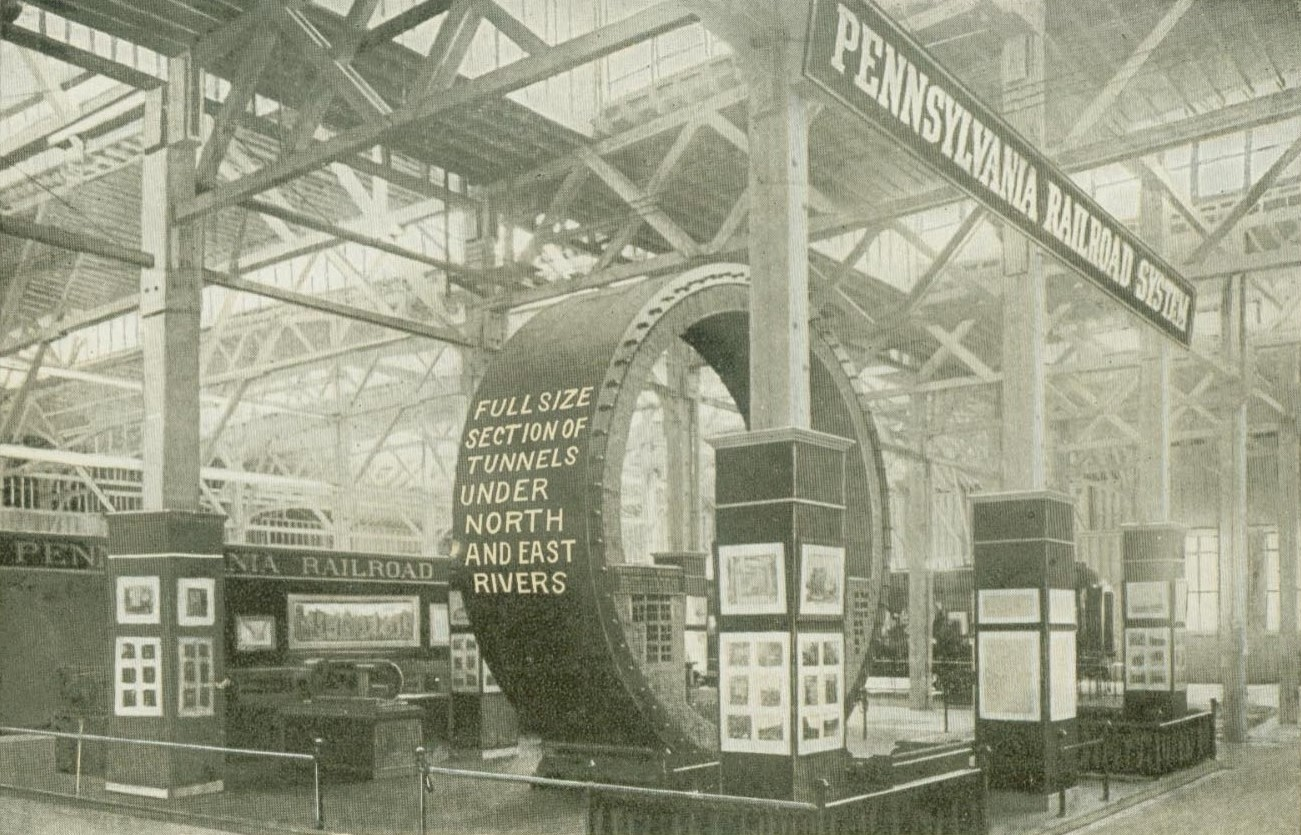
Exposition display showing cross-section of East River railroad tunnel to Pennsylvania Station

The Brooklyn Bridge, completed in 1883, was the first bridge to span the East River, connecting the cities of New York and Brooklyn, and all but replacing the frequent ferry service between them, which did not return until the late 20th century. The bridge offered cable car service across the span. The Brooklyn Bridge was followed by the Williamsburg Bridge (1903), the Queensboro Bridge (1909), the Manhattan Bridge (1912) and the Hell Gate Railroad Bridge (1916). Later would come the Robert F. Kennedy Bridge (1936), the Bronx–Whitestone Bridge (1939), the Throgs Neck Bridge (1961) and the Rikers Island Bridge (1966). In addition, numerous rail tunnels pass under the East River – most of them part of the New York City Subway system – as does the Brooklyn–Battery Tunnel and the Queens–Midtown Tunnel. (See Crossings below for details.) Also under the river is Water Tunnel #1 of the New York City water supply system, built in 1917 to extend the Manhattan portion of the tunnel to Brooklyn, and via City Tunnel #2 (1936) to Queens; these boroughs had become part of New York City after the city's consolidation in 1898. City Tunnel #3 will also run under the river, under the northern tip of Roosevelt Island, and is expected to not be completed until at least 2026; the Manhattan portion of the tunnel went into service in 2013.

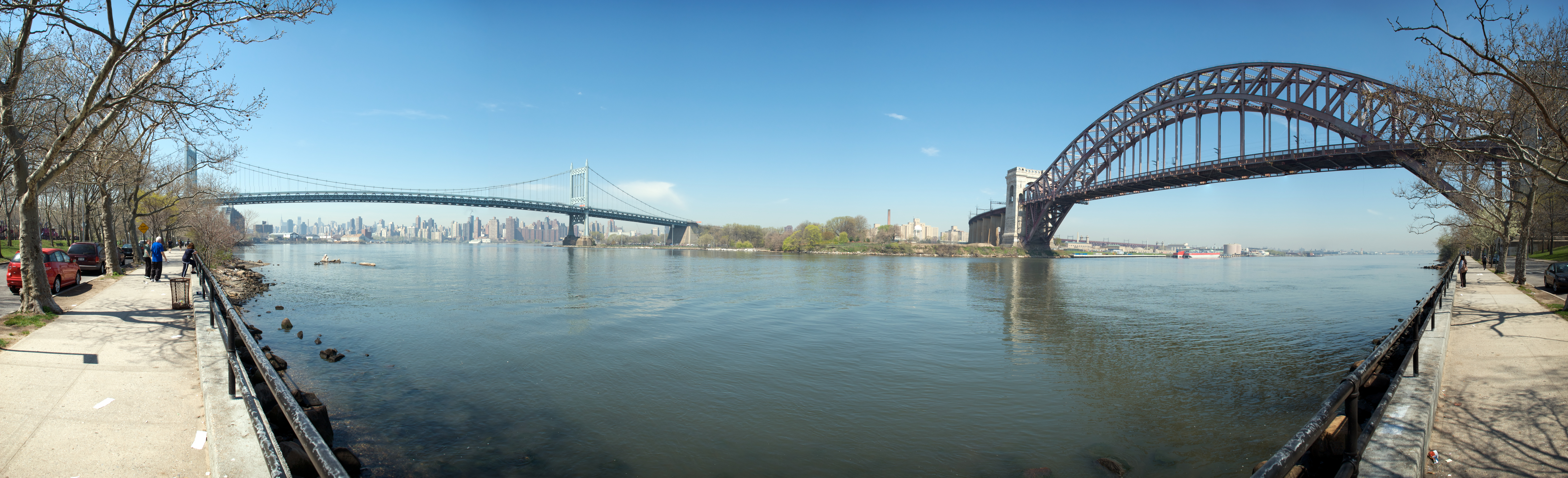
A panorama of the suspension section of the Robert F. Kennedy Bridge (left) and the Hell Gate Bridge (right), as seen from Astoria Park in Queens

=== 20th century ===
Historical film of the East River, leading up to a final shot of the Brooklyn Bridge (1903)

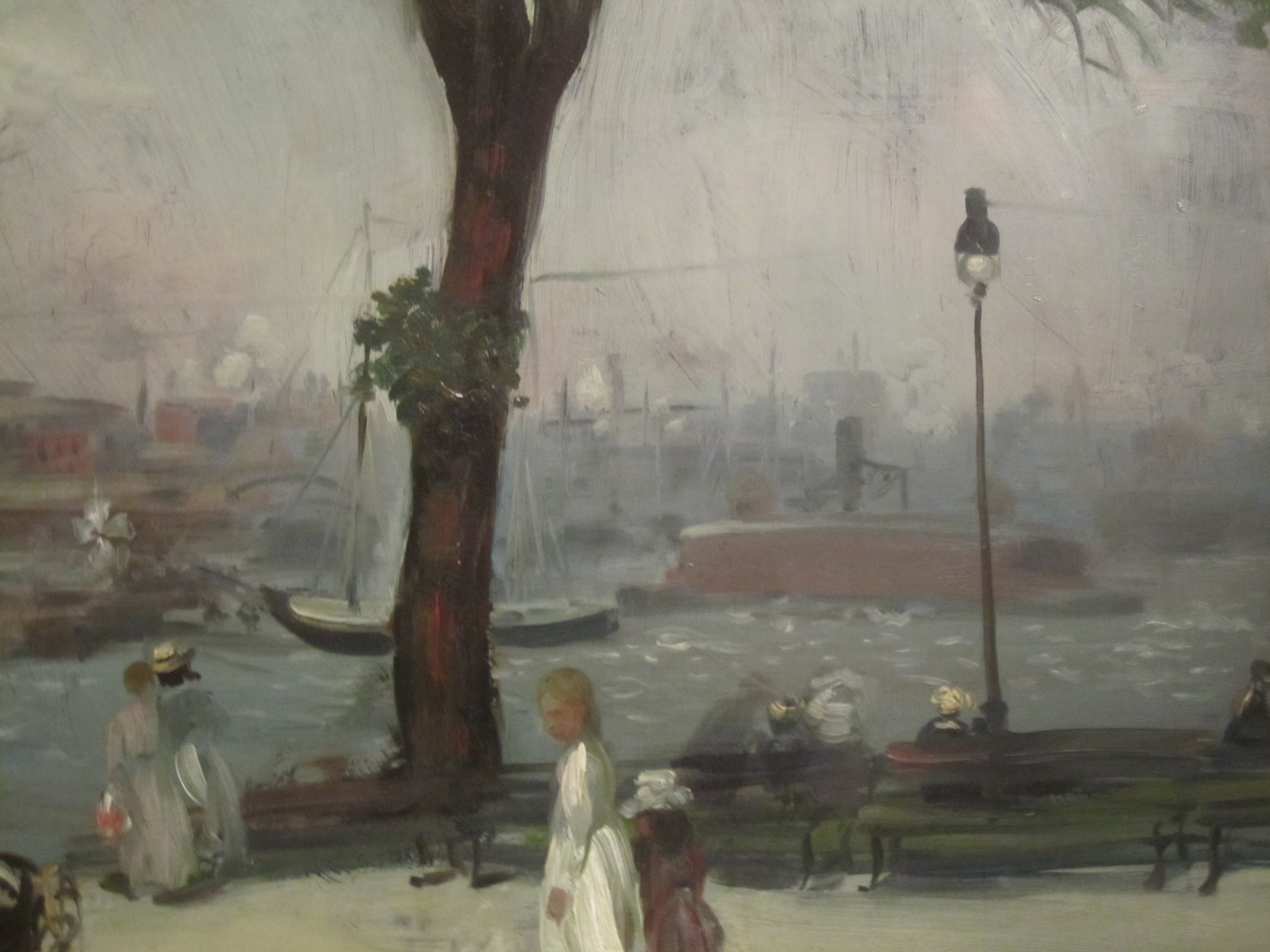
William Glackens's 1902 painting of East River Park, in the Brooklyn Museum

Philanthropist John D. Rockefeller founded what is now Rockefeller University in 1901, between 63rd and 64th Streets on the river side of York Avenue, overlooking the river. The university is a research university for doctoral and post-doctoral scholars, primarily in the fields of medicine and biological science. North of it is one of the major medical centers in the city, NewYork Presbyterian / Weill Cornell Medical Center, which is associated with the medical schools of both Columbia University and Cornell University. Although it can trace its history back to 1771, the center on York Avenue, much of which overlooks the river, was built in 1932.

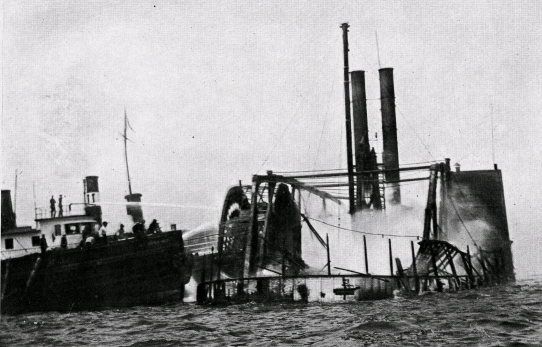
Firefighters working to put out the fire on the listing General Slocum

The East River was the site of one of the greatest disasters in the history of New York City when, in June 1904, the PS General Slocum sank near North Brother Island due to a fire. It was carrying 1,400 German-Americans to a picnic site on Long Island for an annual outing. There were only 321 survivors of the disaster, one of the worst losses of life in the city's long history, and a devastating blow to the Little Germany neighborhood on the Lower East Side. The captain of the ship and the managers of the company that owned it were indicted, but only the captain was convicted; he spent 3 1/2 years of his 10-year sentence at Sing Sing Prison before being released by a federal parole board, and then pardoned by President William Howard Taft.

Beginning in 1934, and then again from 1948 to 1966, the Manhattan shore of the river became the location for the limited-access East River Drive, which was later renamed after Franklin Delano Roosevelt, and is universally known by New Yorkers as the "FDR Drive". The road is sometimes at grade, sometimes runs under locations such as the site of the Headquarters of the United Nations and Carl Schurz Park and Gracie Mansion – the mayor's official residence, and is at time double-decked, because Hell Gate provides no room for more landfill. It begins at Battery Park, runs past the Brooklyn, Manhattan, Williamsburg and Queensboro Bridges, and the Ward's Island Footbridge, and terminates just before the Robert F. Kennedy Triboro Bridge when it connects to the Harlem River Drive. Between most of the FDR Drive and the river is the East River Greenway, part of the Manhattan Waterfront Greenway. The East River Greenway was primarily built in connection with the building of the FDR Drive, although some portions were built as recently as 2002, and other sections are still incomplete.

In 1963, Consolidated Edison built the Ravenswood Generating Station on the Long Island City shore of the river, on land some of which was once stone quarries which provided granite and marble slabs for Manhattan's buildings. The plant has since been owned by KeySpan. National Grid and TransCanada, the result of deregulation of the electrical power industry. The station, which can generate about 20% of the electrical needs of New York City – approximately 2,500 megawatts – receives some of its fuel by oil barge.

North of the power plant can be found Socrates Sculpture Park, an illegal dumpsite and abandoned landfill that in 1986 was turned into an outdoor museum, exhibition space for artists, and public park by sculptor Mark di Suvero and local activists. The area also contains Rainey Park, which honors Thomas C. Rainey, who attempted for 40 years to get a bridge built in that location from Manhattan to Queens. The Queensboro Bridge was eventually built south of this location.

=== 21st century ===
In 2011, NY Waterway started operating its East River Ferry line. The route was a 7-stop East River service that runs in a loop between East 34th Street and Hunters Point, making two intermediate stops in Brooklyn and three in Queens. The ferry, an alternative to the New York City Subway, cost $4 per one-way ticket. It was instantly popular: from June to November 2011, the ferry saw 350,000 riders, over 250% of the initial ridership forecast of 134,000 riders. In December 2016, in preparation for the start of NYC Ferry service the next year, Hornblower Cruises purchased the rights to operate the East River Ferry. NYC Ferry started service on May 1, 2017, with the East River Ferry as part of the system.

In February 2012 the federal government announced an agreement with Verdant Power to install 30 tidal turbines in the channel of the East River. The turbines were projected to begin operations in 2015 and are supposed to produce 1.05 megawatts of power. The strength of the current foiled an earlier effort in 2007 to tap the river for tidal power.

On May 7, 2017, the catastrophic failure of a Consolidated Edison substation in Brooklyn caused a spill into the river of over 5,000 US gallons (18,927 L; 4,163 imp gal) of dielectric fluid, a synthetic mineral oil used to cool electrical equipment and prevent electrical discharges. (See below.)

At the end of 2022, gold miner John Reeves claimed that up to 50 tons of ice age artifacts bound for the American Museum of Natural History, including mammoth remains, had been dumped into the East River near 65th Street. Although the museum denied that any fossils had been dumped into the river, Reeves's allegations prompted commercial divers to search the river for evidence of mammoth bones.

== Ecosystem collapse, pollution and health ==
Throughout most of the history of New York City, and New Amsterdam before it, the East River has been the receptacle for the city's garbage and sewage. "Night men" who collected "night soil" from outdoor privies would dump their loads into the river, and even after the construction of the Croton Aqueduct (1842) and then the New Croton Aqueduct (1890) gave rise to indoor plumbing, the waste that was flushed away into the sewers, where it mixed with ground runoff, ran directly into the river, untreated. The sewers terminated at the slips where ships docked, until the waste began to build up, preventing dockage, after which the outfalls were moved to the end of the piers. The "landfill" which created new land along the shoreline when the river was "wharfed out" by the sale of "water lots" was largely garbage such as bones, offal, and even whole dead animals, along with excrement – human and animal. The result was that by the 1850s, if not before, the East River, like the other waterways around the city, was undergoing the process of eutrophication where the increase in nitrogen from excrement and other sources led to a decrease in free oxygen, which in turn led to an increase in phytoplankton such as algae and a decrease in other life forms, breaking the area's established food chain. The East River became very polluted, and its animal life decreased drastically.

In an earlier time, one person had described the transparency of the water: "I remember the time, gentlemen, when you could go in twelve feet of water and you could see the pebbles on the bottom of this river." As the water got more polluted, it darkened, underwater vegetation (such as photosynthesizing seagrass) began dying, and as the seagrass beds declined, the many associated species of their ecosystems declined as well, contributing to the decline of the river. Also harmful was the general destruction of the once plentiful oyster beds in the waters around the city, (Note: Oysters were so plentiful in New Amsterdam and early New York that they were considered to be food for the poor, although the rich also ate them in great numbers. They were sold in specialized "oyster shops" and by vendors on the street, some of which were paved with their shells. Pearl Street was named after the piles of oysters left there by the Native Americans of the area. "Enjoy the oysters" was often said to a person planning on traveling to New York City, so strong was the bivalve as an icon of the city. It was only after the collapse of the local oyster beds, by around 1920, that oysters became scarce, and a delicacy only affordable by the rich. Burrows and Wallace, pp.460, 798, 816 Kurlansky, Mark "oysters" in Jackson, Kenneth T., ed. (2010). The Encyclopedia of New York City (2nd ed.). New Haven: Yale University Press. ISBN 978-0-300-11465-2., pp.963–964 Steinberg, pp.7, 170–71) and the over-fishing of menhaden, or mossbunker, a small silvery fish which had been used since the time of the Native Americans for fertilizing crops – however it took 8,000 of these schooling fish to fertilize a single acre, so mechanized fishing using the purse seine was developed, and eventually the menhaden population collapsed. Menhaden feed on phytoplankton, helping to keep them in check, and are also a vital step in the food chain, as bluefish, striped bass and other fish species which do not eat phytoplankton feed on the menhaden. The oyster is another filter feeder: oysters purify 10 to 100 gallons a day, while each menhaden filters four gallons in a minute, and their schools were immense: one report had a farmer collecting 20 oxcarts worth of menhaden using simple fishing nets deployed from the shore. The combination of more sewage, due to the availability of more potable water – New York's water consumption per capita was twice that of Europe – indoor plumbing, the destruction of filter feeders, and the collapse of the food chain, damaged the ecosystem of the waters around New York, including the East River, almost beyond repair.

Because of these changes to the ecosystem, by 1909, the level of dissolved-oxygen in the lower part of the river had declined to less than 65%, where 55% of saturation is the point at which the amount of fish and the number of their species begins to be affected. Only 17 years later, by 1926, the level of dissolved oxygen in the river had fallen to 13%, below the point at which most fish species can survive.

Due to heavy pollution, the East River is dangerous to people who fall in or attempt to swim in it, although as of mid-2007 the water was cleaner than it had been in decades. As of 2010, the New York City Department of Environmental Protection (DEP) categorizes the East River as Use Classification I, meaning it is safe for secondary contact activities such as boating and fishing. According to the marine sciences section of the DEP, the channel is swift, with water moving as fast as four knots, just as it does in the Hudson River on the other side of Manhattan. That speed can push casual swimmers out to sea. A few people drown in the waters around New York City each year.

As of 2013, it was reported that the level of bacteria in the river was below federal guidelines for swimming on most days, although the readings may vary significantly, so that the outflow from Newtown Creek or the Gowanus Canal can be tens or hundreds of times higher than recommended, according to Riverkeeper, a non-profit environmentalist advocacy group. The counts are also higher along the shores of the strait than they are in the middle of its flow. Nevertheless, the "Brooklyn Bridge Swim" is an annual event where swimmers cross the channel from Brooklyn Bridge Park to Manhattan.

Thanks to reductions in pollution, cleanups, the restriction of development, and other environmental controls, the East River along Manhattan is one of the areas of New York's waterways – including the Hudson-Raritan Estuary and both shores of Long Island – which have shown signs of the return of biodiversity. On the other hand, the river is also under attack from hardy, competitive, alien species, such as the European green crab, which is considered to be one of the world's ten worst invasive species, and is present in the river.

=== 2017 oil spill ===
On May 7, 2017, the catastrophic failure of Con Edison's Farragut Substation at 89 John Street in Dumbo, Brooklyn, caused a spill of dielectric fluid – an insoluble synthetic mineral oil, considered non-toxic by New York state, used to cool electrical equipment and prevent electrical discharges – into the East River from a 37,000-US-gallon (140,060 L; 30,809 imp gal) tank. The National Response Center received a report of the spill at 1:30pm that day, although the public did not learn of the spill for two days, and then only from tweets from NYC Ferry. A "safety zone" was established, extending from a line drawn between Dupont Street in Greenpoint, Brooklyn, to East 25th Street in Kips Bay, Manhattan, south to Buttermilk Channel. Recreational and human-powered vehicles such as kayaks and paddleboards were banned from the zone while the oil was being cleaned up, and the speed of commercial vehicles restricted so as not to spread the oil in their wakes, causing delays in NYC Ferry service. The clean-up efforts were being undertaken by Con Edison personnel and private environmental contractors, the United States Coast Guard, and the New York State Department of Environmental Conservation, with the assistance of NYC Emergency Management.

The loss of the sub-station caused a voltage dip in the power provided by Con Ed to the Metropolitan Transportation Authority's New York City Subway system, which disrupted its signals.

The Coast Guard estimated that 5,200 US gallons (19,684 L; 4,330 imp gal) of oil spilled into the water, with the remainder soaking into the soil at the substation. In the past the Coast Guard has on average been able to recover about 10% of oil spilled, however the complex tides in the river make the recovery much more difficult, with the turbulent water caused by the river's change of tides pushing contaminated water over the containment booms, where it is then carried out to sea and cannot be recovered. By Friday May 12, officials from Con Edison reported that almost 600 US gallons (2,271 L; 500 imp gal) had been taken out of the water.

Environmental damage to wildlife is expected to be less than if the spill was of petroleum-based oil, but the oil can still block the sunlight necessary for the river's fish and other organisms to live. Nesting birds are also in possible danger from the oil contaminating their nests and potentially poisoning the birds or their eggs. Water from the East River was reported to have tested positive for low levels of PCB, a known carcinogen.

Putting the spill into perspective, John Lipscomb, the vice president of advocacy for Riverkeepers said that the chronic release after heavy rains of overflow from city's wastewater treatment system was "a bigger problem for the harbor than this accident." The state Department of Environmental Conservation is investigating the spill. It was later reported that according to DEC data which dates back to 1978, the substation involved had spilled 179 times previously, more than any other Con Ed facility. The spills have included 8,400 gallons of dielectric oil, hydraulic oil, and antifreeze which leaked at various times into the soil around the substation, the sewers, and the East River.

On June 22, Con Edison used non-toxic green dye and divers in the river to find the source of the leak. As a result, a 4-inch (10 cm) hole was plugged. The utility continued to believe that the bulk of the spill went into the ground around the substation, and excavated and removed several hundred cubic yards of soil from the area. They estimated that about 5,200 US gallons (19,684 L; 4,330 imp gal) went into the river, of which 520 US gallons (1,968 L; 433 imp gal) were recovered. Con Edison said that it installed a new transformer, and intended to add new barrier around the facility to help guard against future spills propagating into the river.

== Crossings ==
Crossing	Carries	Coordinates	Year opened
Manhattan–Brooklyn
City Tunnel#1	water supply		1917
Brooklyn–Battery Tunnel	I-478 (unsigned)		1950
Joralemon Street Tunnel	"4" train "5" train		1908
Montague Street Tunnel	"N" train "R" train "W" train		1920
Clark Street Tunnel	"2" train "3" train		1919
Cranberry Street Tunnel	"A" train "C" train		1932
Brooklyn Bridge	vehicles, pedestrians, bicycles		1883
Manhattan Bridge	, vehicles, pedestrians, bicycles		1909
Rutgers Street Tunnel	"F" train "F" express train		1936
Williamsburg Bridge	, vehicles, pedestrians, bicycles		1903
13th Street Pumping Station tunnel	wastewater		
14th Street Tunnel	"L" train		1924
Manhattan–Queens
East River Tunnels	Amtrak – Northeast Corridor; Long Island Rail Road		1910
Queens–Midtown Tunnel	I-495		1940
Steinway Tunnel	"7" train "7" express train		1915
53rd Street Tunnel	"E" train "F" train "F" express train		1933
Ed Koch Queensboro Bridge (59th Street Bridge)	NY 25, pedestrians, bicycles		1909
60th Street Tunnel	"N" train "R" train "W" train		1920
Roosevelt Island Tramway (only crosses west channel to Roosevelt Island within Manhattan)	pedestrians, bicycles via aerial tramway		1976
63rd Street Tunnel	East Side Access of the Long Island Rail Road		1989
Roosevelt Island Bridge (only crosses east channel to Roosevelt Island)	vehicles, pedestrians, bicycles		1955
City Tunnel#3	water supply		1993
Robert F. Kennedy Bridge Suspension Span	I-278, pedestrians, bicycles		1936
Hell Gate Bridge	Amtrak Northeast Corridor; CSX Transportation Fremont Secondary; Providence & Worcester Railroad		1916
The Bronx–Queens
Rikers Island Bridge (only crosses south channel to Rikers Island)	vehicles		1966
Bronx–Whitestone Bridge	I-678		1939
Throgs Neck Bridge	I-295		1961

== In popular culture ==
- The Brecker Brothers performed a song named after the river that is featured on their album Heavy Metal Be-Bop (1978).
- According to its author, Yasushi Akimoto, the noted Japanese song "Kawa no Nagare no Yō ni" – the "swan song" of the noted singer Hibari Misora – was inspired by the East River.
- In the Seinfeld episode "The Nap", Cosmo Kramer takes up swimming in the East River.
- In the 2004 film Spider-Man 2, Doctor Octopus's run down lair is situated on the East River. This is also where the final battle between him and Spider-Man takes place and also where he sacrifices himself to stop the fusion reactor he created which would threaten all of New York City.
- In Forever, the immortal Dr. Henry Morgan is reborn naked in the East River each time he dies.
- In the final Percy Jackson and the Olympians novel, The Last Olympian, the East River appears as a river spirit in the form of a telkhine. The East River Spirit is a rival to the Hudson River Spirit, but assists the Demigods in the Battle of Manhattan by sinking the Titan's ships.

== Views of the river ==
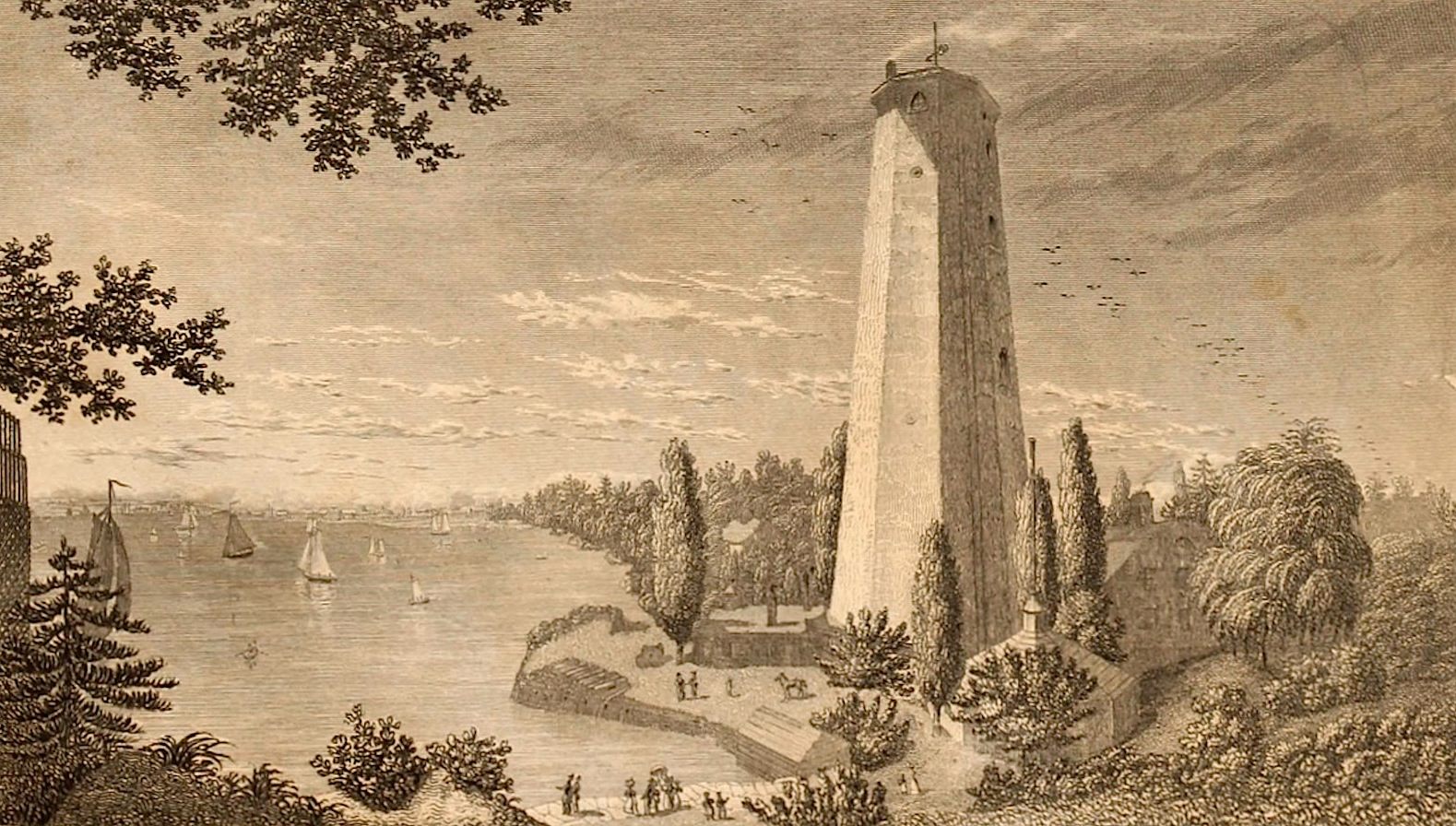
A shot tower at 53rd Street in Manhattan on the East River (1831)

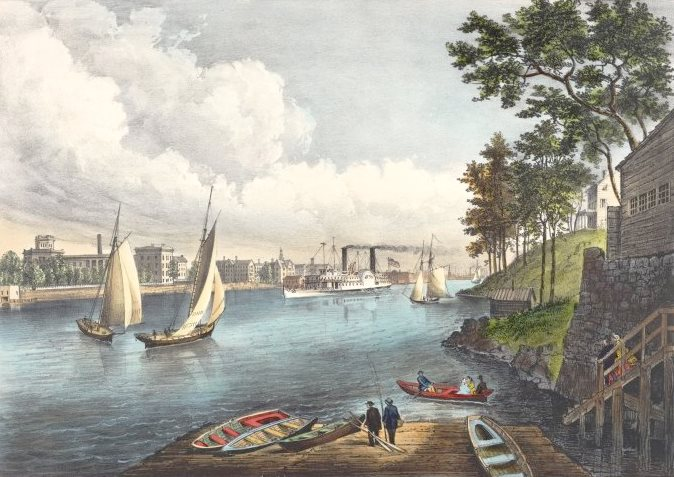
Blackwells Island from Eighty Sixth Street, Currier & Ives (1862); Blackwell's Island is now known as Roosevelt Island

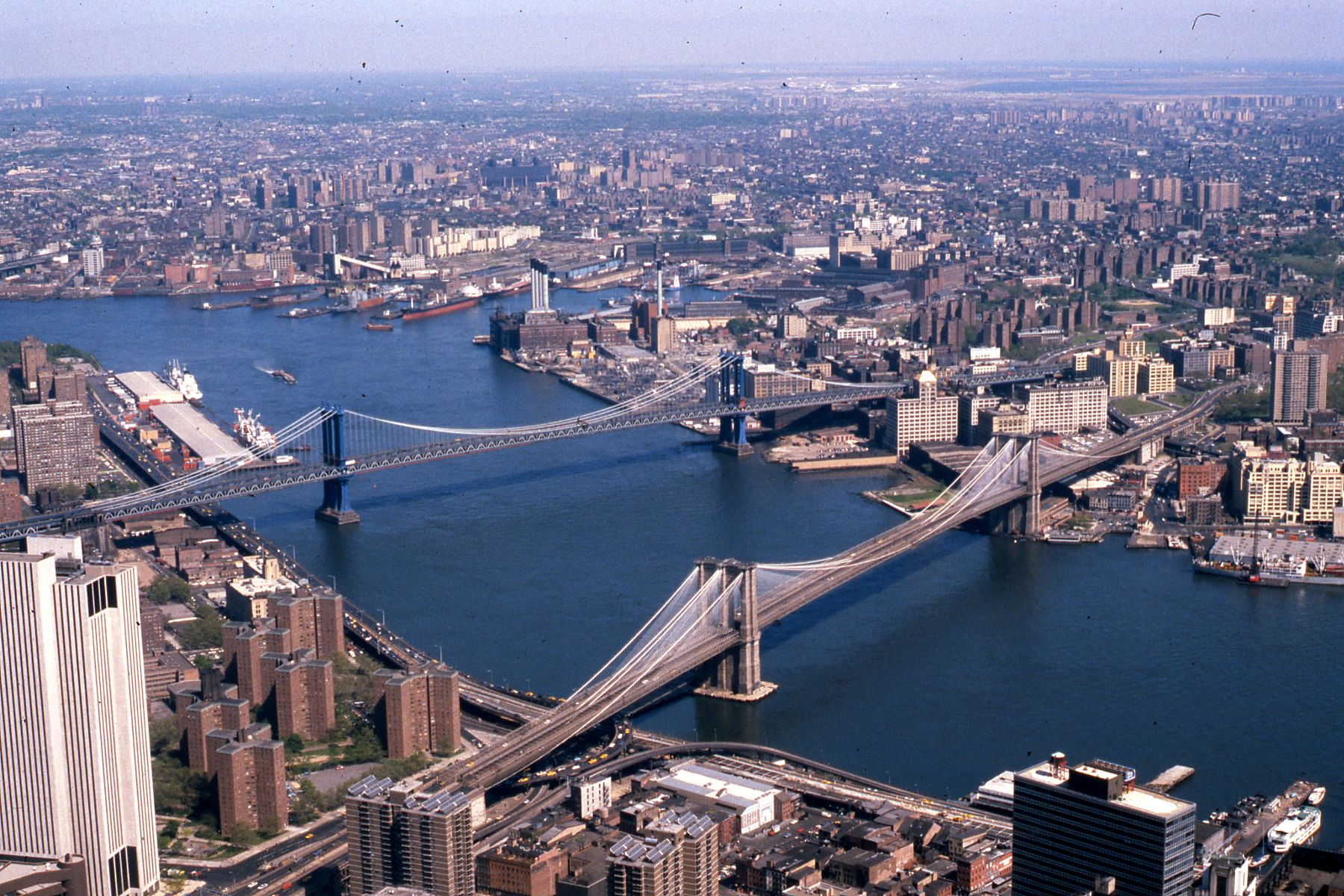
Manhattan Bridge (top) and Brooklyn Bridge (bottom); Manhattan is on the left, Brooklyn on the right (1981)

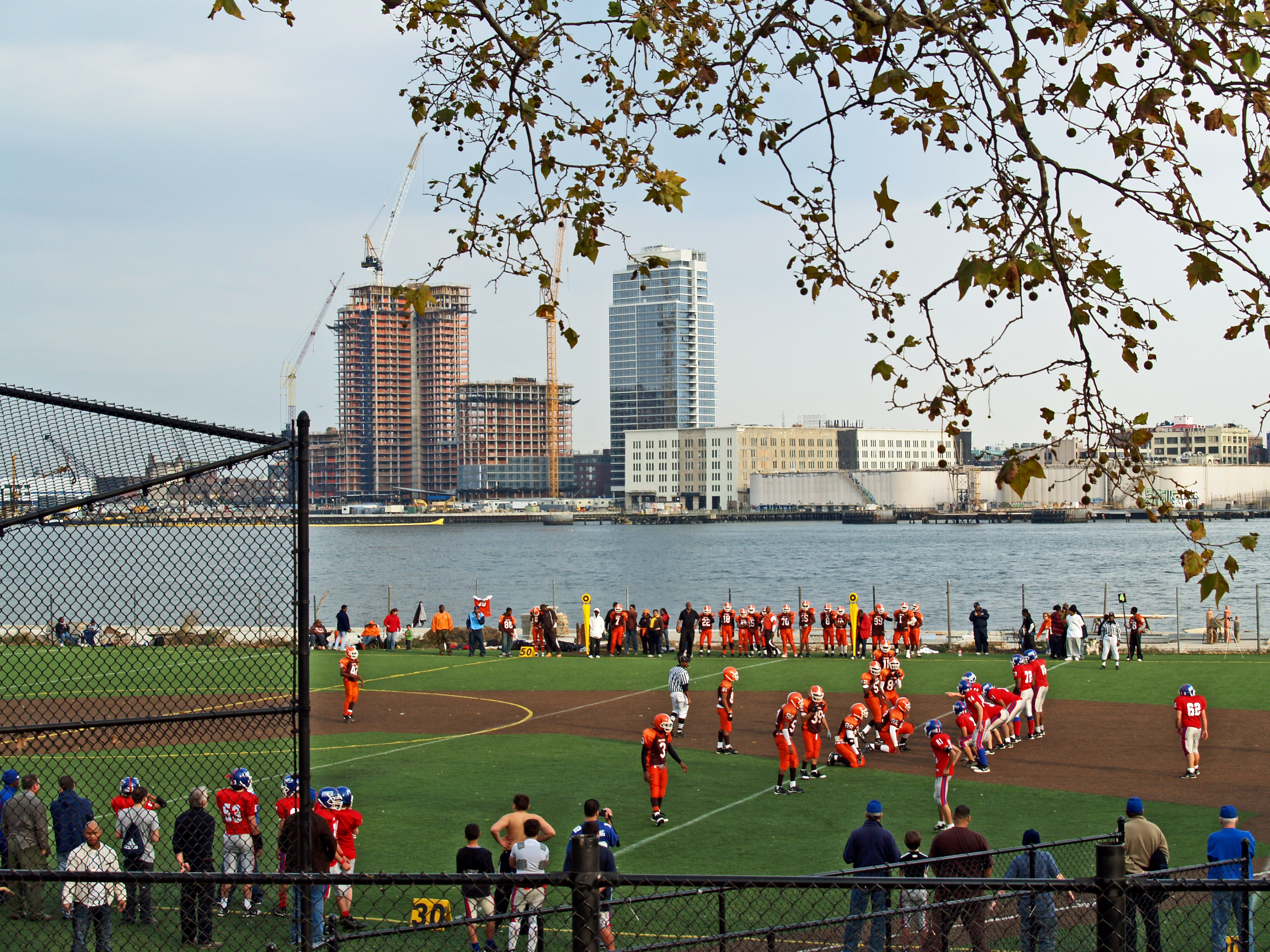
The East River passes children playing football in East River Park (2008)

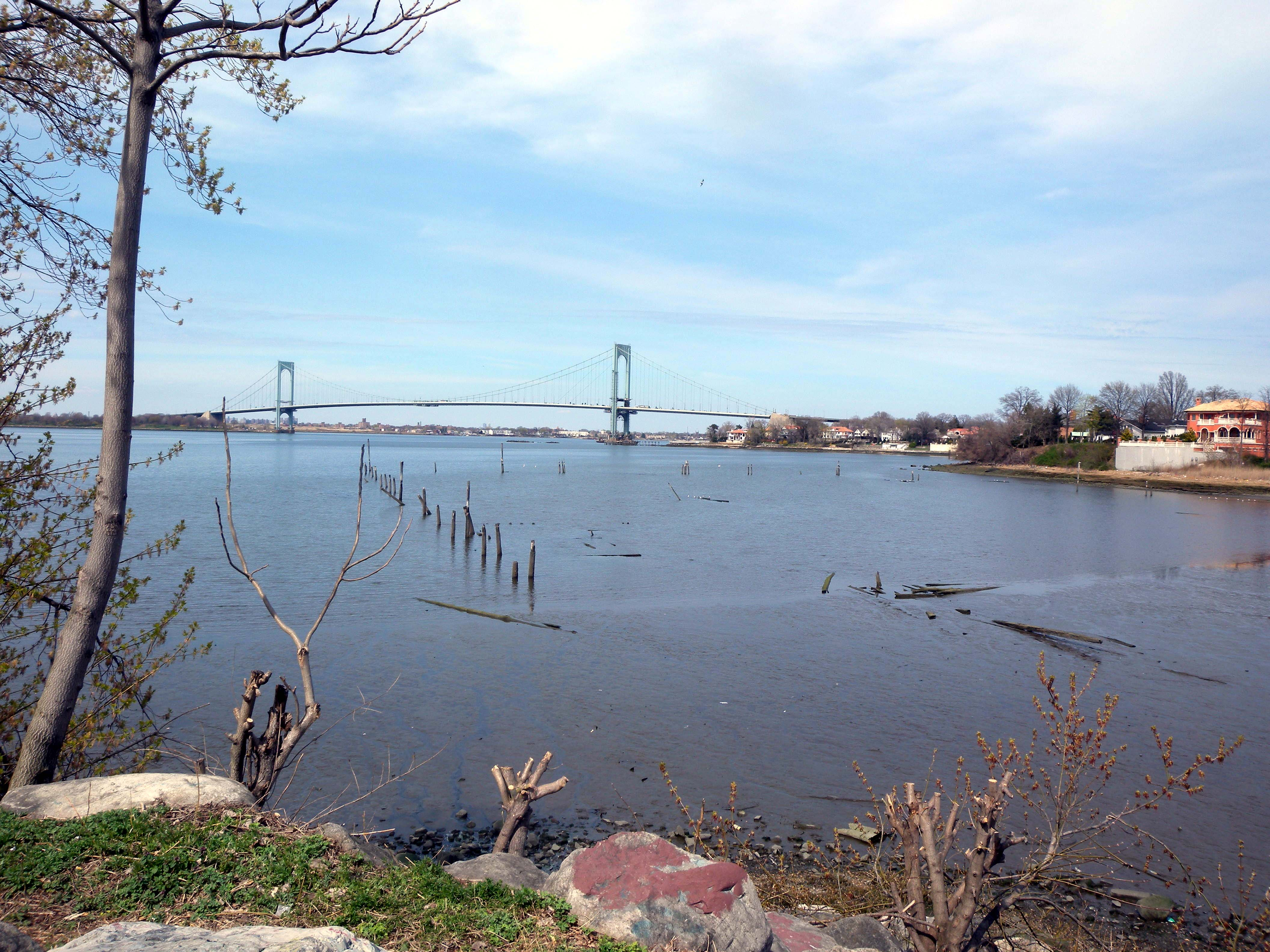
Powell's Cove, in Whitestone, Queens
(2009)

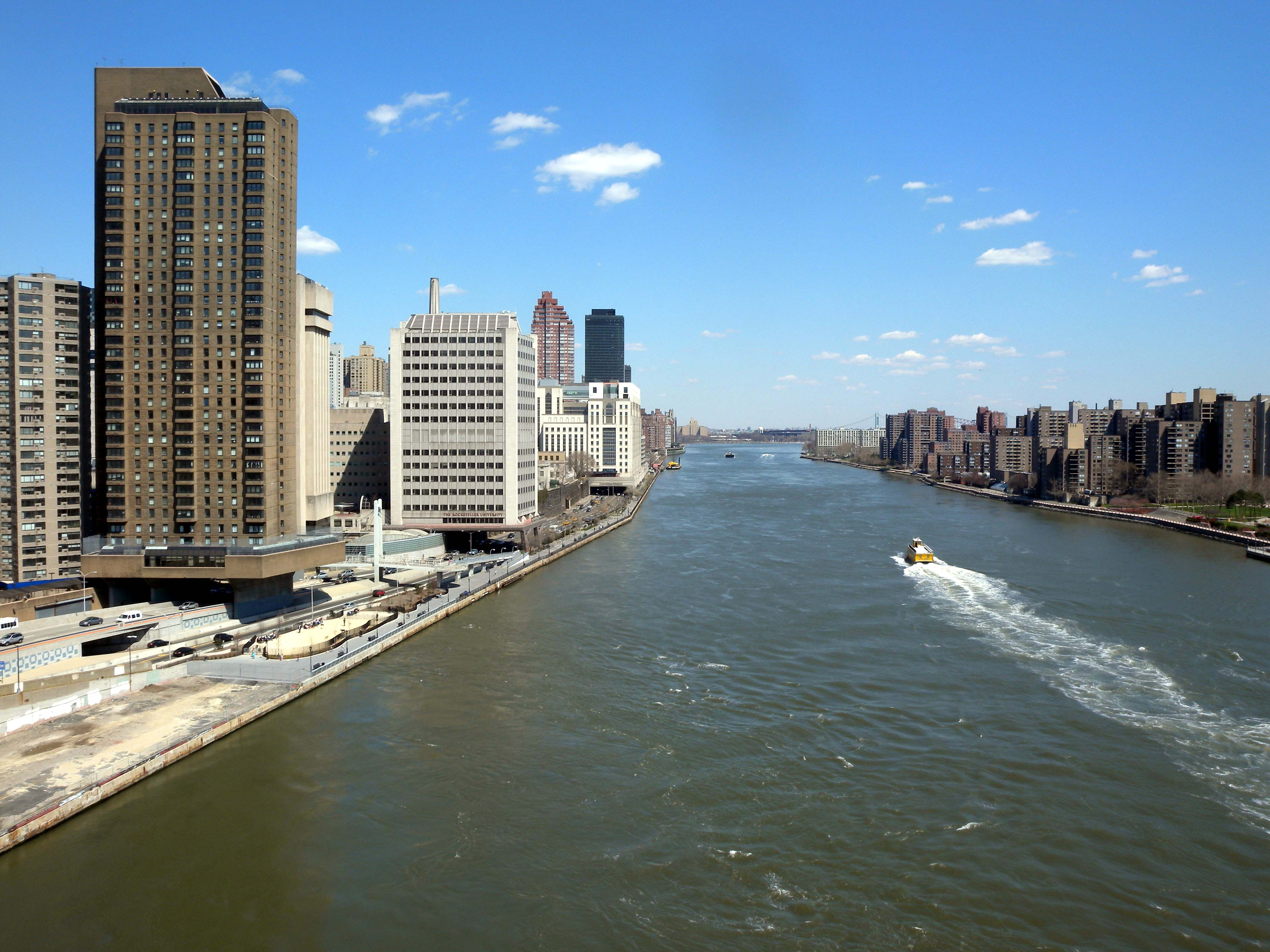
The East River flows past the Upper East Side
(2009)

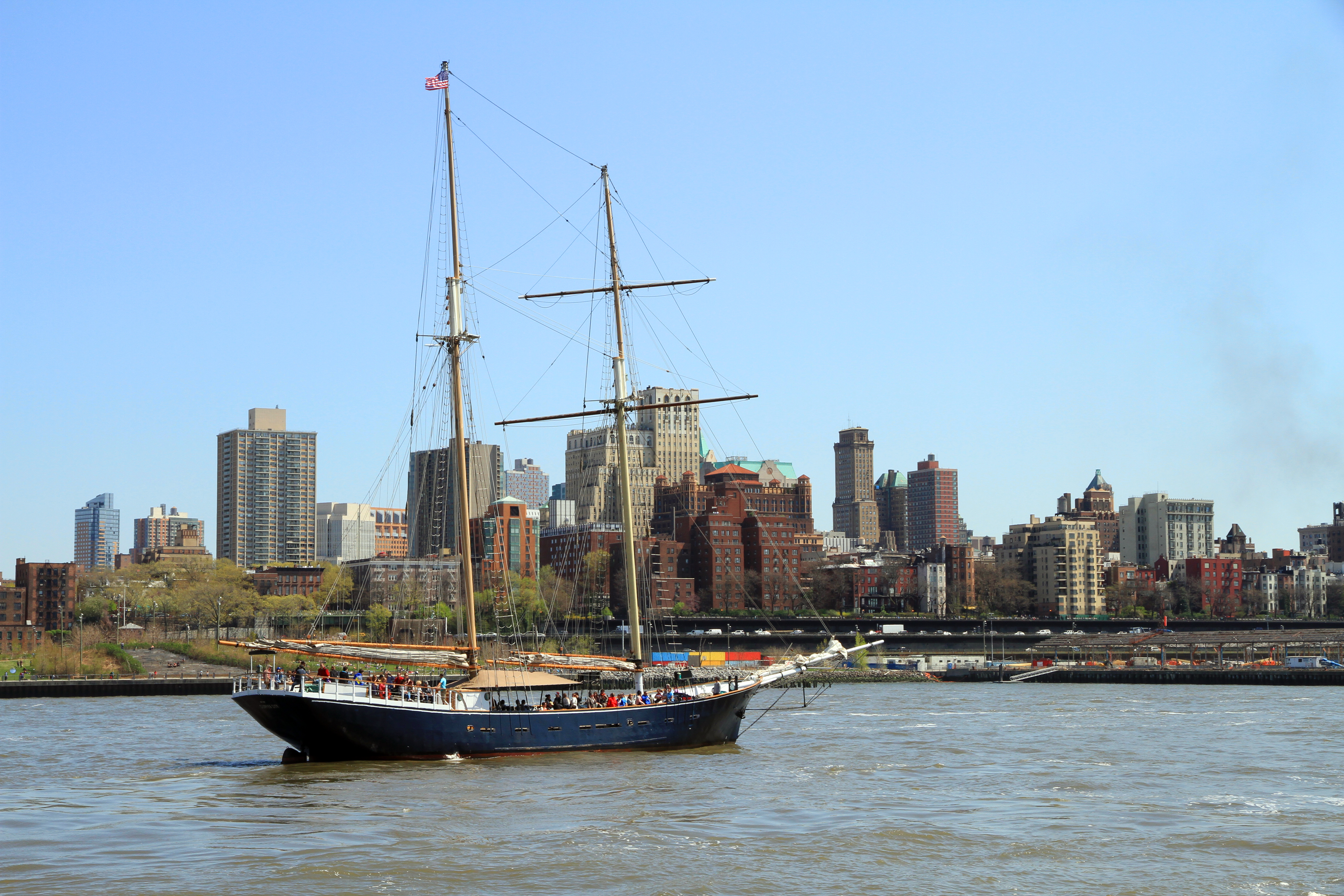
The East River with Brooklyn Heights in the background, Topsail Schooner Clipper City (2013)

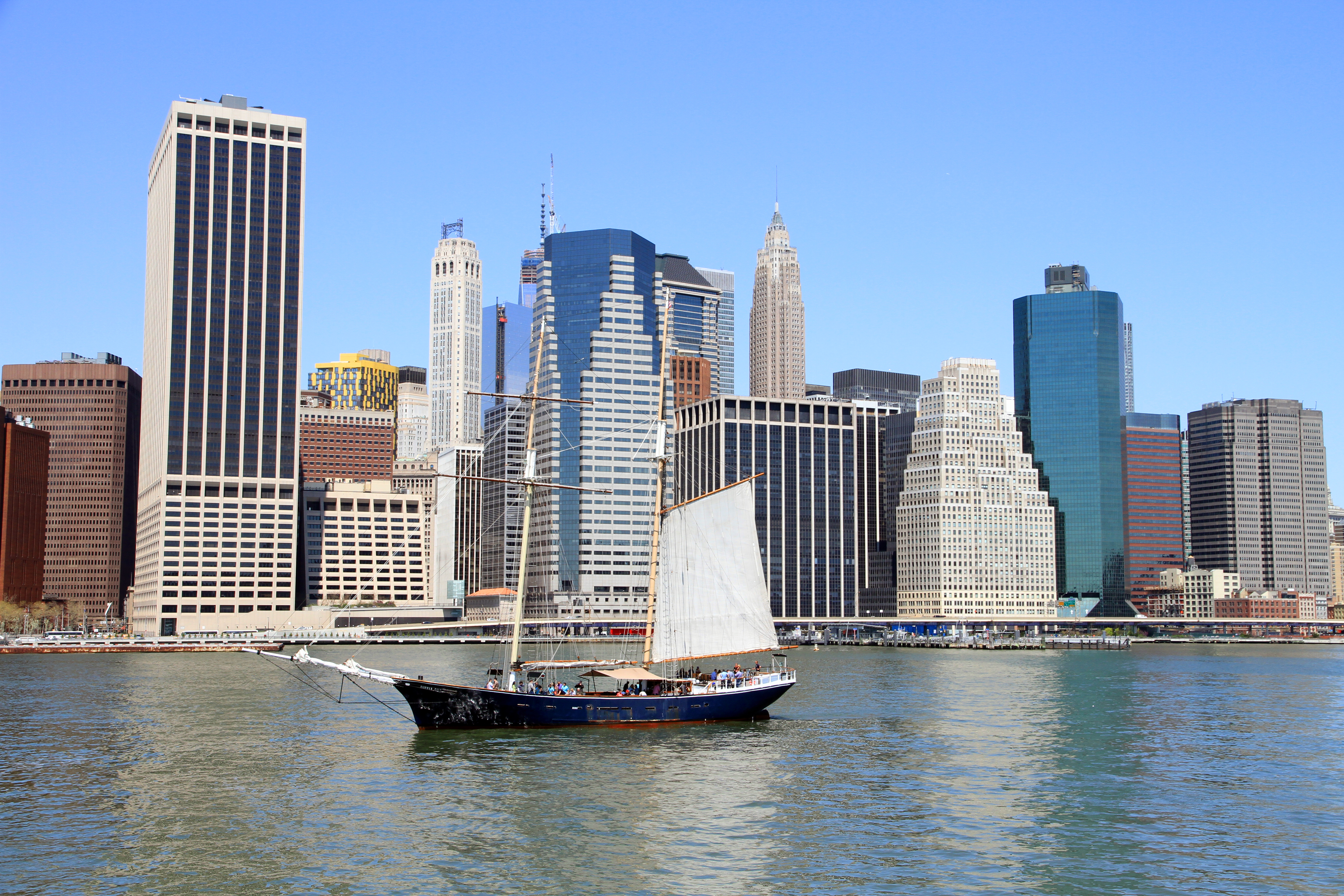
The East River and Lower Manhattan (2013)

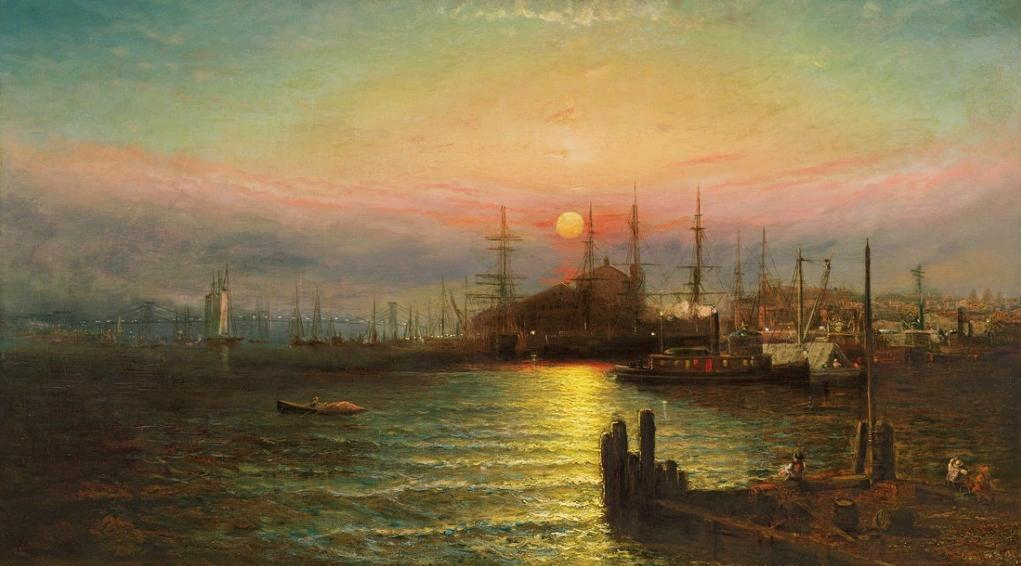
Elisha Taylor Baker, East River Scene, Brooklyn, NY, 1886. Oil on canvas.

== See also ==
- List of New York rivers
- Lists of crossings of the East River
- Geography and environment of New York City
- Geography of New York Harbor

== Works cited ==
- Barthel, Thomas (2021). Opening the East River: John Newton and the Blasting of Hell Gate. Jefferson, North Carolina: McFarland. ISBN 978-1476682983.
- Burrows, Edwin G. and Wallace, Mike (1999). Gotham: A History of New York City to 1898. New York: Oxford University Press. ISBN 0-195-11634-8.
- Eldredge, Niles and Horenstein, Sidney (2014). Concrete Jungle: New York City and Our Last Best Hope for a Sustainable Future. Berkeley, California: University of California Press. ISBN 978-0-520-27015-2. OCLC 888191476.
- Jackson, Kenneth T., ed. (1995). The Encyclopedia of New York City. New Haven: Yale University Press. ISBN 0300055366.
- Koeppel, Gerard (2015). City on a Grid: How New York Became New York. Boston: Da Capo Press. ISBN 978-0-306-82284-1.
- Steinberg, Ted (2010). Gotham Unbound: The Ecological History of Greater New York. New York: Simon & Schuster. ISBN 978-1-476-74124-6.
