= Benjamin Maillefert =

Professor Benjamin S. H. Maillefert (November 11, 1813 – August 8, 1884) was an engineer who specialized in underwater blasting. He developed torpedoes used by the Union naval forces during the American Civil War.

Maillefert was born in Barcelona, Spain and was responsible for several attempts a blasting to improve navigation through Hell Gate in New York City's East River. His obituary from the August 12, 1884 The New York Times reads:

Prof. Benjamin S. H. Maillefert was a member of the firm of B. Maillefert & Co., who obtained a reputation in their experiments with surface blasting, which was applied by them to the Hell Gate work. He was engaged in this work as far back as 1851-1854. Their implements for surface blasting consisted simply of a boat and iron rod, to feel the bottom with and to let down charges with an electric battery. Later, the firm obtained a contract to clear away Pot Rock and Sheldrake Reef, the contract ending on January 1, 1870. The result of their labor was not entirely satisfactory, as during the summer the rock was blown away only so as to give a depth from 12 to 20 feet, while the contract called for 25 feet. The Government then took charge of the work under Gen. Newton. Prof. Maillefert since then led a quiet life, not engaging in any business.

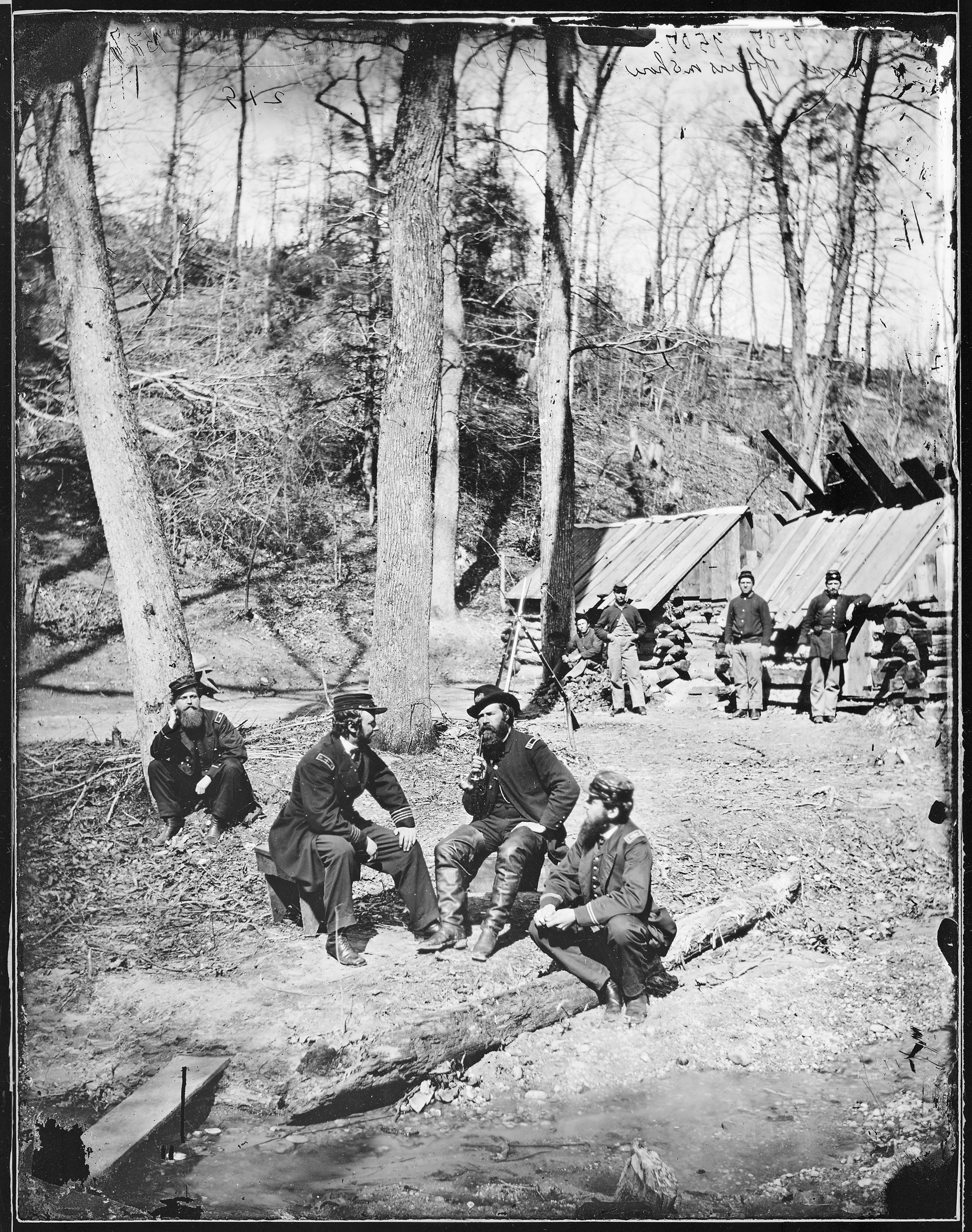
Prof. Maillefert on site at the James River in spring 1865
