= Hell Gate =

Tidal strait in New York City

Coordinates: 40°47′03″N 73°55′14″W

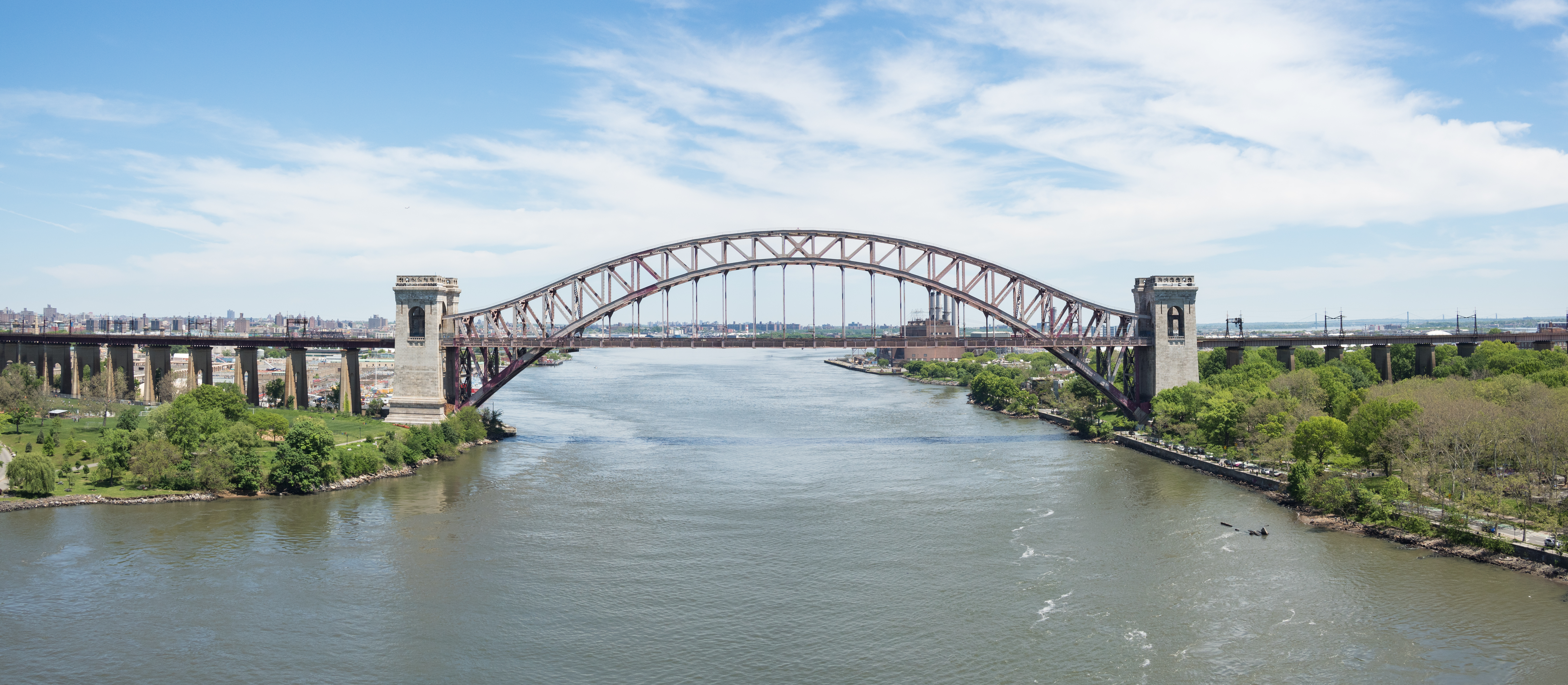
Hell Gate and the Hell Gate Bridge, looking north

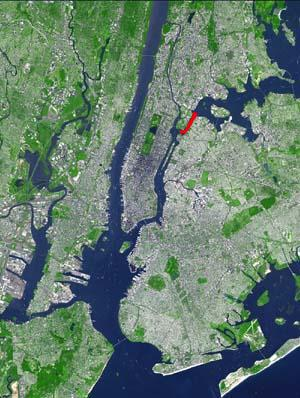
Hell Gate, shown in red, in a satellite photo of New York Harbor, separating Wards Island to the west and Astoria, Queens to the east

Hell Gate is a narrow tidal strait in the East River in New York City. It separates Astoria, Queens, from Randall's and Wards Islands in Manhattan.

== Etymology ==
The name "Hell Gate" is a corruption of the Low German or Dutch phrase Hellegat, which means "bright gate". It first appeared on a Dutch map as Helle Gadt. The name was originally applied to the entirety of the East River, by Dutch explorer Adriaen Block, the first European known to have navigated the strait, who bestowed the name sometime during his 1614–1616 voyage aboard the Onrust circumnavigating Long Island, from its namesake Hellegat on (the mouth of) the Scheldt, in Zeeland back in the Netherlands. (Note: Hellegat is a fairly common name for waterways in the Low Countries, with at least 20 examples.)

This name Hellegat was taken from the Greek Hellespont (Dardanelles) which also has a dangerous reputation, in the opinion of historian Edward Manning Ruttenber. Alternatively, the name could be construed to mean "bright strait" or "clear opening", according to geographer Henry Gannett.

Because explorers found navigation hazardous in this New World place of rocks and converging tide-driven currents (from the Long Island Sound, Harlem River strait, Upper Bay of New York Harbor, and lesser channels, some of which have been filled), the Anglicization stuck.

The strait was also known as Hurl Gate (or Hurlgate), and so labeled on 18th and 19th century maps and annals, this name probably consisting of Dutch warrel "whirl" and gat "hole, gap, mouth", in effect denoting "whirlpool".

For the whirlpool that develops in Hell Gate, the name Monatun was applied by Dr. Henry Rowe Schoolcraft; the name is said to mean "violent, forcible, dangerous".

== History ==
In October 1776, Admiral Howe sailed some of the British fleet through the strait, an action which was considered reckless at the time.

A NYC ferry travels down the Hell Gate under the RFK bridge

Hell Gate was spanned in 1917 by the New York Connecting Railroad Bridge, now called the Hell Gate Bridge, which connects Wards Island and Queens. The bridge provides a direct rail link between New England and New York City. In 1936, it was spanned by the Triborough Bridge (now the Robert F. Kennedy Bridge), allowing vehicular traffic to pass among Manhattan, the Bronx, and Queens.

=== Clearing rocks ===
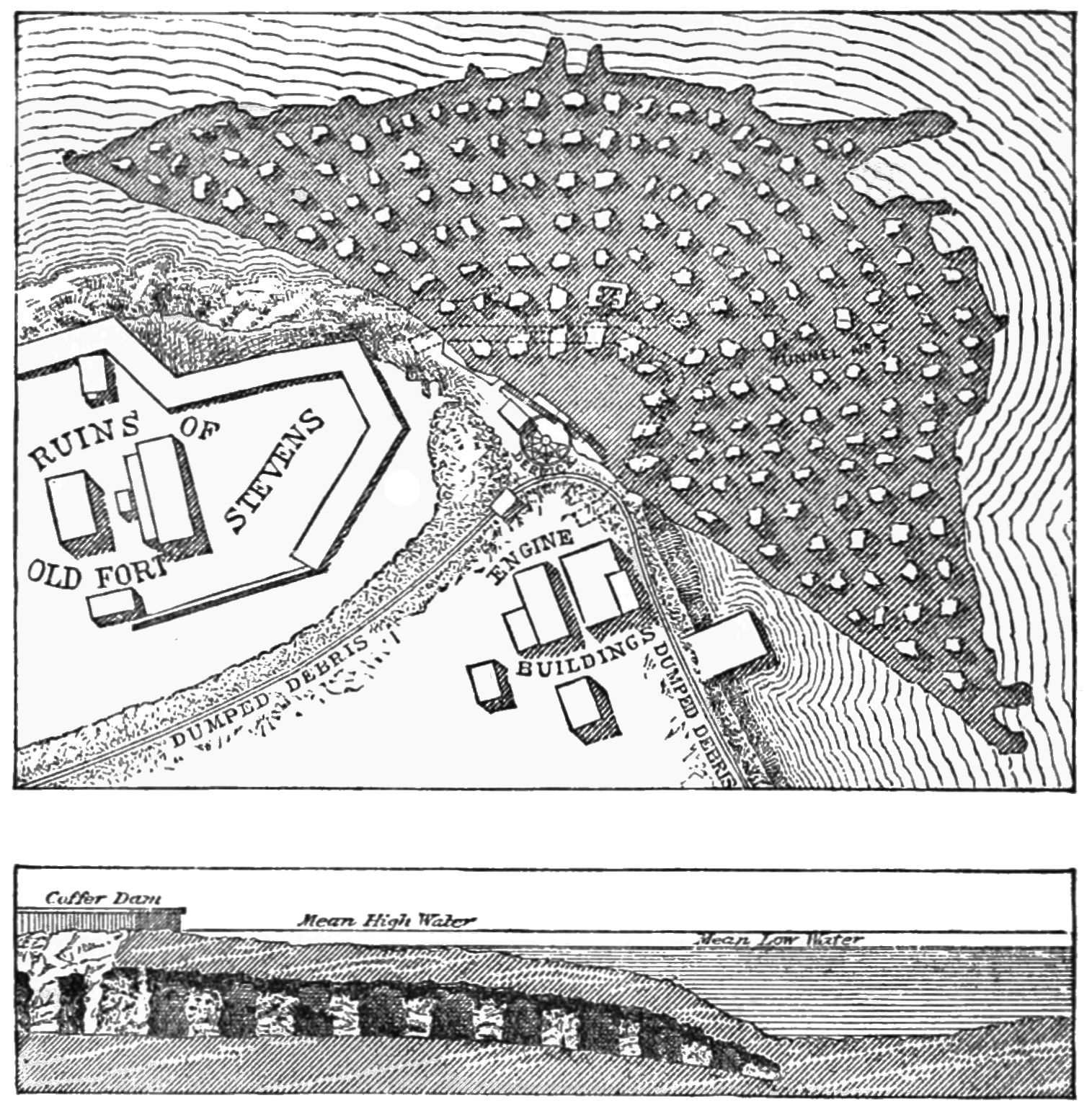
The excavations and tunnels used to undermine Hallet's Point near the former site of Fort Stevens

Periodically, merchants and other interested parties would try to get something done about the difficulty of navigating through Hell Gate. In 1832, the New York State legislature was presented with a petition for a canal to be built through nearby Hallet's Point, thus avoiding Hell Gate altogether. Instead, the legislature responded by providing ships with pilots trained to navigate the shoals for the next 15 years.

In 1849, a French engineer whose specialty was underwater blasting, Benjamin Maillefert, had cleared some of the rocks which, along with the mix of tides, made the Hell Gate stretch of the river so dangerous to navigate. Ebenezer Meriam had organized a subscription to pay Maillefert $6,000 to, for instance, reduce "Pot Rock" to provide 24 feet (7.3 m) of depth at low-mean water. While ships continued to run aground (in the 1850s about 2% of ships did so) and petitions continued to call for action, the federal government undertook surveys of the area which ended in 1851 with a detailed and accurate map.

By then Maillefert had cleared the rock "Baldheaded Billy", and it was reported that Pot Rock had been reduced to 20.5 feet (6.2 m), which encouraged the United States Congress to appropriate $20,000 for further clearing of the strait. However, a more accurate survey showed that the depth of Pot Rock was actually a little more than 18 feet (5.5 m), and eventually Congress withdrew its funding.

With the main shipping channels through The Narrows into the harbor silting up with sand due to littoral drift, thus providing ships with less depth, and a new generation of larger ships coming online – epitomized by Isambard Kingdom Brunel's SS Great Eastern, popularly known as "Leviathan" – New York began to be concerned that it would start to lose its status as a great port if a "back door" entrance into the harbor was not created. In the 1850s the depth continued to lessen – the harbor commission said in 1850 that the mean water low was 24 feet (7.3 m) and the extreme water low was 23 feet (7.0 m) – while the draft required by the new ships continued to increase, meaning it was only safe for them to enter the harbor at high tide.

The U.S. Congress, realizing that the problem needed to be addressed, appropriated $20,000 for the Army Corps of Engineers to continue Maillefert's work, but the money was soon spent without appreciable change in the hazards of navigating the strait. An advisory council recommended in 1856 that the strait be cleared of all obstacles, but nothing was done, and the Civil War soon broke out.

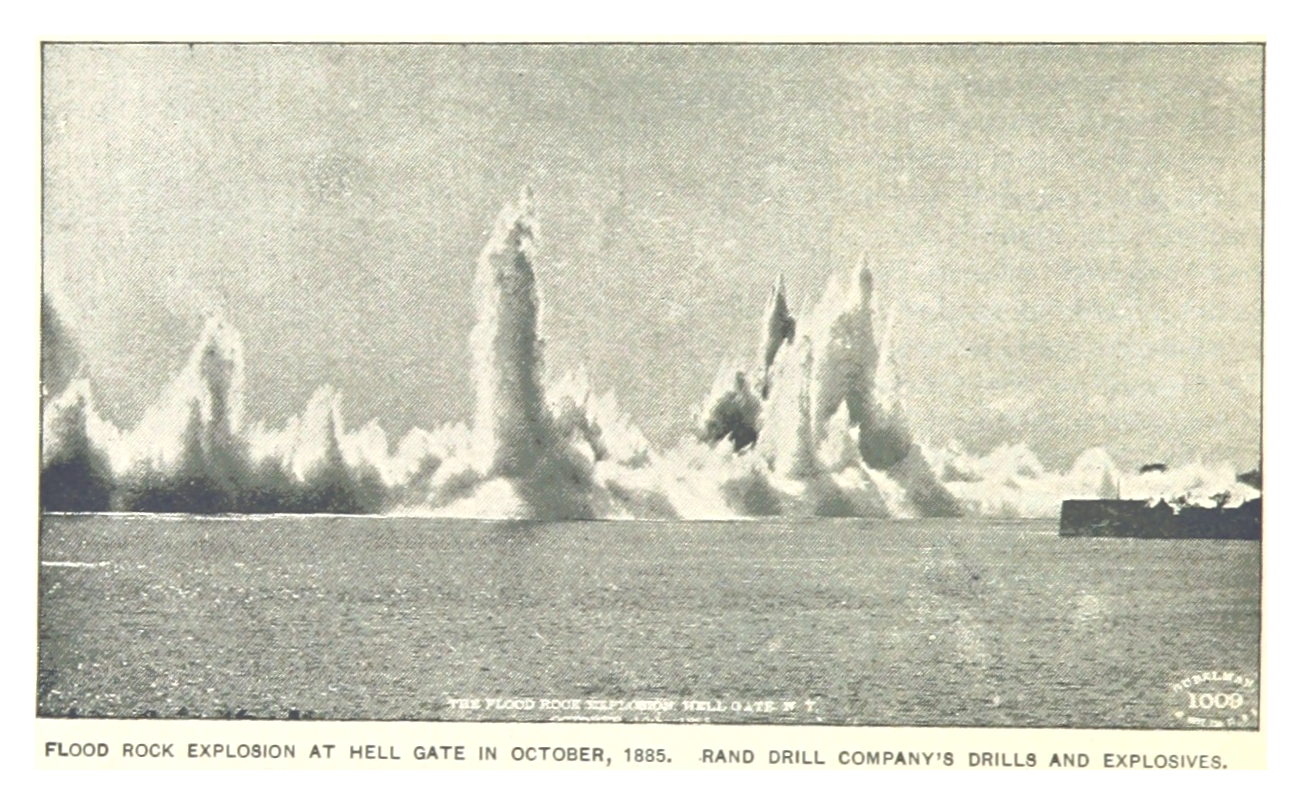
The 1885 explosion

In the late 1860s, after the Civil War, Congress realized the military importance of having easily navigable waterways, and charged the Army Corps of Engineers with clearing Hell Gate of the rocks there that caused a danger to navigation. The Corps' Colonel James Newton estimated that the project would cost $1 million, as compared to the approximate annual loss in shipping of $2 million. Initial forays floundered, and Newton, by that time a general, took over direct control of the project. In 1868 Newton decided, with the support of both New York's mercantile class and local real estate interests, to focus on the 3-acre (1.2 ha) Hallet's Point Reef off of Queens. The project would involve 7,000 feet (2,100 m) of tunnels equipped with trains to haul debris out as the reef was eviscerated, creating a reef structured like Swiss cheese, which Newton would then blow up.

After seven years of digging seven thousand holes, and filling four thousand of them with 30,000 pounds (14,000 kg) of dynamite, on September 24, 1876, in front of an audience of people including the inhabitants of the insane asylum on Wards Island, but not the prisoners of Blackwell's Island (now known as Roosevelt Island) who remained in their cells, Newton's daughter set off the explosion. The effect was immediate in decreased turbulence through the strait, and fewer accidents and shipwrecks. The city's Chamber of Commerce commented that "The Centennial year will be for ever known in the annals of commerce for this destruction of one of the terrors of navigation." Clearing out the debris from the explosion took until 1891.

Newton had begun to undermine Flood Rock, a 9-acre (3.6 ha) reef, even before starting on Hallet's Rock, removing 8,000 cubic yards (6,100 m^{3}) of rock from the reef. In 1885 Flood Rock was blown up as well, with Civil War general Philip Sheridan and abolitionist Henry Ward Beecher among those in attendance. Newton's daughter once more set off the blast, the biggest ever to that date and subsequently reported as the largest peacetime, man-made explosion until the advent of the atomic bomb although the detonation at the Battle of Messines in 1917 was several times larger. Two years later, plans were in place to dredge Hell Gate to a consistent depth of 26 feet (7.9 m).

== In popular culture ==
=== Film ===
- Hell Gate: The Watery Grave (1977), is a 50-minute documentary film, narrated by Alexander Scourby, which covers many aspects of the waterway's history, including the clearing of the channel, the building of Hell Gate Bridge, and the PS General Slocum steamship disaster.
- Under Hellgate Bridge (1999), directed by Michael Sergio, is a crime drama/thriller film, set in Queens, that features the bridge.
- Gangs of New York (2002), directed by Martin Scorsese; the main character, Amsterdam Vallon (Leonardo DiCaprio), is sent to Hell Gate Orphanage as a child upon the death of his father

=== Literature ===
In James Fenimore Cooper's historical fiction novel The Water-Witch, or, The Skimmer of the Seas (first published in New York in 1830), Hell Gate serves as the scene for an exciting pursuit of the brigantine Water Witch by HMS Coquette. The Water Witch is captained by Thomas Tiller, an adventurous sailor with a romantic flair, and HMS Coquette by Captain Cornelius van Cuyler Ludlow, a principled young officer in the Royal Navy and a native of New York.

== See also ==
- Little Hell Gate
- List of place names of Dutch origin
- Spuyten Duyvil, Bronx
