= Elm Court (Newport, Rhode Island) =

Historic building in Rhode Island, USA

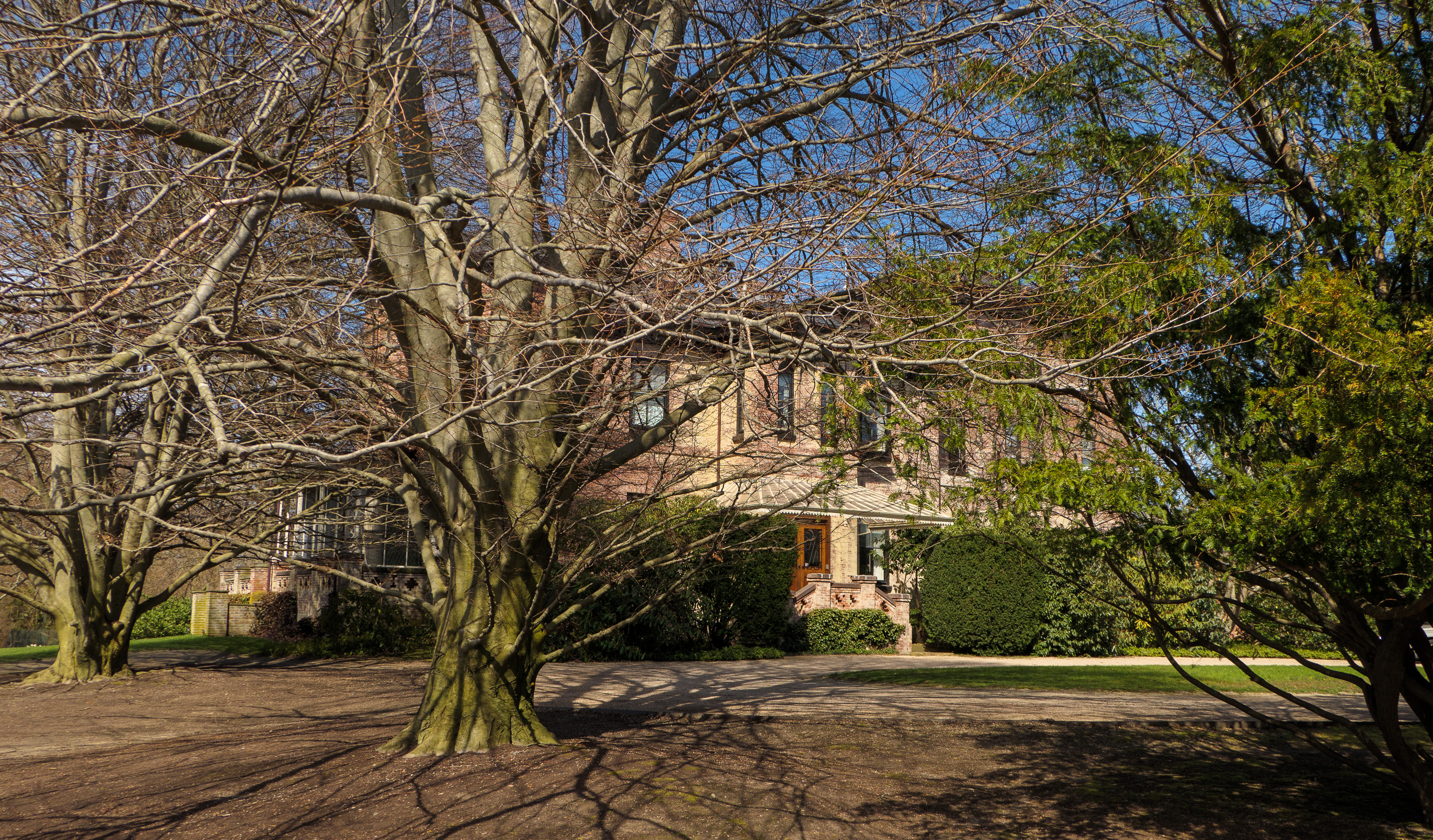
- Interactive map of the Elm Court area
- Former names: The Cedars, The Elms

General information
- Type: Residence
- Architectural style: Italianate
- Location: Newport, Rhode Island, US, 315 Bellevue Avenue
- Coordinates: 41.48032°N 71.30911°W
- Completed: 1853
- Renovated: 1882
- Client: Andrew Robeson Jr.
- Owner: Guy Van Pelt

Design and construction
- Architect: George Champlin Mason Sr.

Renovating team
- Architect: McKim, Mead & White
- Other designers: Ogden Codman Jr.

Elm Court is an Italianate style mansion located at 315 Bellevue Avenue in Newport, Rhode Island. Part of the Bellevue Avenue Historic District, it was built in 1853 and designed in the Italianate style by George Champlin Mason Sr. In 1882, McKim, Mead & White renovated the remodeled and enlarged the house after it was bought in c. 1875 by Adele L. S. Stevens, who also had the interiors redone by Ogden Codman Jr. Since 1896, Elm Court has been owned by the same family and remains a private residence.

== History ==
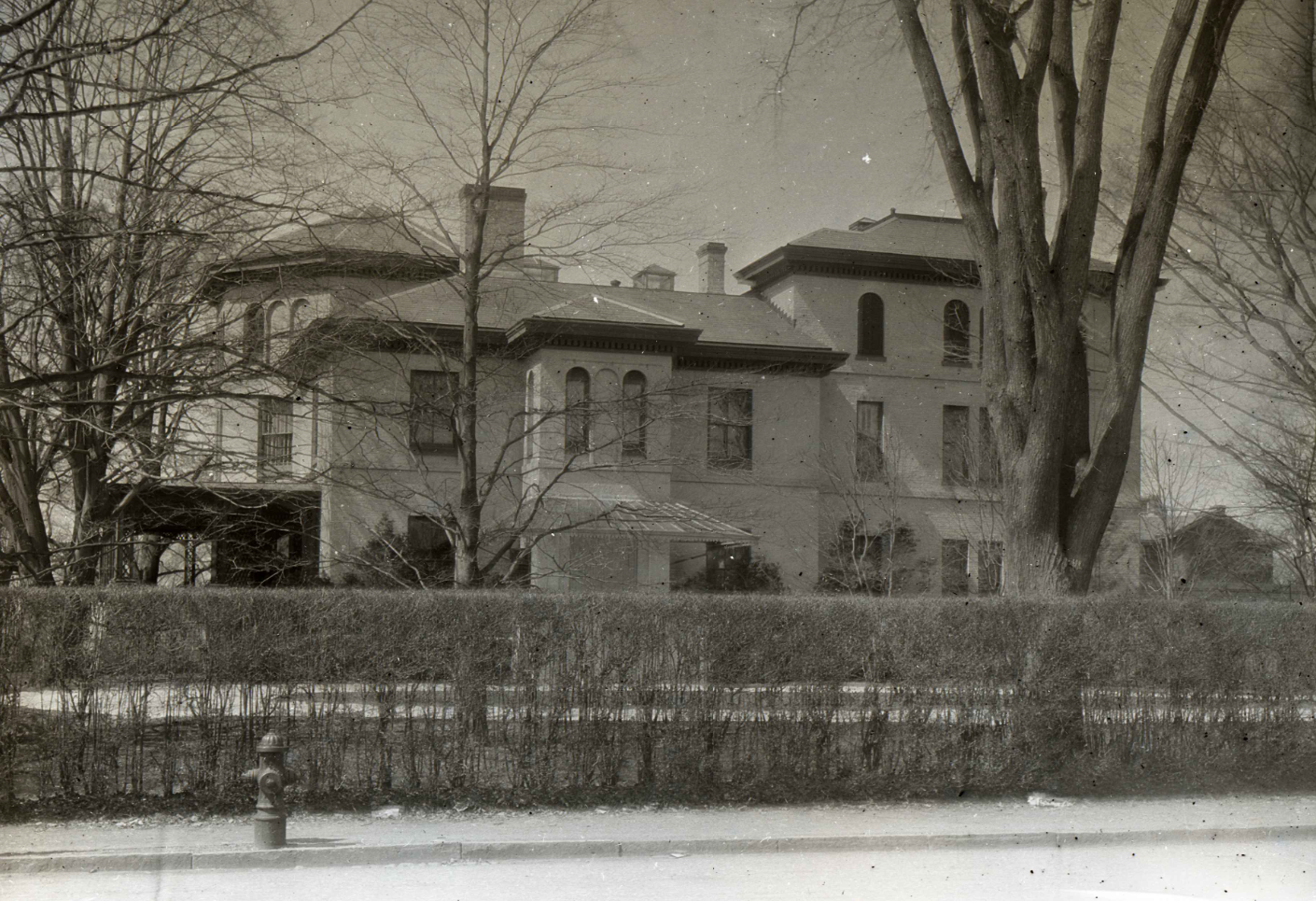
Undated photo

The Cedars, as it was originally known, was built in 1853 for Boston merchant Andrew Robeson Jr., and his wife, Mary Arnold (née Allen) Robeson. (Note: The Robeson's granddaughter (through their daughter, Mary Allen Robeson, the wife of botanist Charles Sprague Sargent), Henrietta Sargent, married the architect Guy Lowell.) The Italianate house is on Bellevue Avenue across from Bowery Street was designed by George Champlin Mason Sr. Across Bowery, also on Bellevue, was Kingscote, one of the first summer "cottages" constructed in Newport for George Noble Jones by Richard Upjohn and built in 1839.

=== Stevens / Talleyrand-Périgord years ===
Following Robeson's death in 1874, the house was sold to Adele Livingston Stevens (née Sampson) and her then husband, Frederic W. Stevens. In 1882, Adele hired Stanford White of McKim, Mead & White to remodel and enlarge the residence at a cost of $16,591 and had the interiors redone by Ogden Codman Jr. Between 1881 and 1883, Isaac Bell Jr. had McKim, Mead and White build a Shingle style home next door at 70 Perry Street, today known as the Isaac Bell House.

Shortly after the renovations were completed, Adele began a relationship with the Marquis de Talleyrand, who was himself married to another American heiress, Elizabeth Beers-Curtis, then left her husband and moved to Paris. After each obtaining a divorce from their spouses, they wed in 1887, after which, she rented out her Newport house. In 1893, Adele sold the house for $87,500 to Christopher R. Robert and his wife, Julia, of New York.

=== Work / Roche / Cary / Van Pelt years ===
In 1896, Julia Robert sold the house, then called "The Elms", and its contents to Frank Work for $115,000. Work passed the estate to his daughter, Frances Ellen Work, who'd recently divorced her first husband (James Roche, 3rd Baron Fermoy), and moved back to America with her daughter, Cynthia Roche, who had her debut in 1902 at a ball at Elm Court. (Note: In 1910, Berkeley Villa (today known as Bellevue House) was built across the street on the other side of Bellevue. It was built for Martha Codman and designed by her cousin, Ogden Codman Jr., as his last project in Newport.) The house passed to Cynthia, who married her second husband, Guy Fairfax Cary, in the house in 1922. Following Cary's death in 1950, it became Cynthia's year-round home instead of a summer home. Since 2008, it has been the home of Mary (née Adickes) and Guy Van Pelt (a son of Cynthia Cary Van Pelt Russell), following the death of Guy's uncle, Guy Fairfax Cary Jr.
