= Adele Livingston Sampson =

American heiress and philanthropist

Adele Livingston de Talleyrand-Périgord, Marquise de Talleyrand, Duchess de Dino (née Sampson; formerly Stevens) (August 23, 1841 – July 19, 1912) was an American heiress and philanthropist, known for her two marriages.

== Early life and education ==
Adele was born in New York City on August 23, 1841. She was the only child of Joseph Sampson (1793–1872) and Adele Sampson (née Livingston) Sampson of the prominent American Livingston family). Her father was a merchant and co-founder of the Chemical Bank, the precursor to JPMorgan Chase.

Her paternal grandparents were the Rev. Ezra Sampson and Mary (née Bourne) Sampson. Her maternal grandparents were Julia Adel (née Broome) Livingston, a daughter of John Broome, who served as Lieutenant Governor of New York from 1804 to 1810, and John Walter Livingston (a great-grandson of Philip Livingston). Her aunt, Julia Livingston, was the wife of the Rev. Henry Philip Tappan.

== Society life ==
As a member of the prominent Livingston family that married into the Stevens family before marrying into the French House of Talleyrand-Périgord, Adele was known in New York City and Newport, Rhode Island. After her first marriage, she lived in a $2,000,000 mansion at 57th Street and Fifth Avenue (which was later sold to William C. Whitney). In Newport, they had a home on Bellevue Avenue called "The Cedars". During her lifetime, she devoted much of her means to charities in New York and in Paris.

After her marriage, she continued to expand her estate and bought real estate in New York.

== Personal life ==
On October 8, 1862, Adele was married to prominent lawyer and banker Frederic William Stevens (1839–1928) in New York City. He was a son of merchant Byam Kerby Stevens Sr. (son of Maj.-Gen. Ebenezer Stevens) and Frances Gallatin Stevens (a daughter of Albert Gallatin, the 4th U.S. Secretary of the Treasury who served as the U.S. Ambassador to the United Kingdom and France). Before their legal separation in 1886 and then divorce, they were the parents of:

- Adele Livingston "Daisy" Stevens (1864–1939), who married lawyer Frederick Hobbes Allen, son of U.S. Representative Elisha Hunt Allen (and the U.S. Minister to the Kingdom of Hawaii), and the grandson of U.S. Senator Samuel Clesson Allen.
- Joseph Sampson Stevens (1865–1935), an original Rough Rider who married Clara Harriet (née Sherwood) Rollins, widow of Edward Rollins and daughter of William Sherwood of St. Louis, Missouri, in 1889.
- Frances Gallatin Stevens (1868–1956), who married the Count de Gallifet, and later, Count Maurice des Monstiers-Mérinville.
- Mabel Ledyard Stevens (1872–1959), who married Polish nobleman Count Micislas Leon Orlowski.

Around 1875, Adele met French aristocrat, soldier, and author Maurice de Talleyrand-Périgord, who was then married to fellow American heiress Elizabeth Beers-Curtis, with whom he had a daughter, Marie Palma de Talleyrand-Périgord (who later married Mario Ruspoli, 2nd Prince of Poggio Suasa). Maurice was the son of Alexandre de Talleyrand-Périgord, who was styled 3rd Duke of Dino, 1st Marquis de Talleyrand, and Valentine de Sainte-Aldegonde. When he returned to Paris, Adele took two of her daughters and went abroad, returning to America in 1882 to seek a divorce, finally obtaining a decree on the grounds of non-support and desertion. Meanwhile, Maurice obtained a divorce from Elizabeth and joined Adele in Paris.

=== Second marriage ===
In what was described as a shock to society, Adele and Maurice married in Paris at the American Church in the Rue de Berri on 25 January 1887. When Maurice became the 4th Duke of Dino, 2nd Marquis de Talleyrand, she became the Duchess of Dino. The "happiness of Mrs. Stevens and the Duc de Dino, however, was only ephemeral, and on April 2, 1903, the first chamber of the Paris Civil Courts pronounced a divorce in favor of the Duchess, the Duc having no presentation in Court."

Adele died at her home, 19 Rue Roynouard, Paris, on July 19, 1912. Her body was returned to New York and she was buried at Green-Wood Cemetery in Brooklyn. Her second husband died at the Villa Périgord in Monte Carlo on 5 January 1917. Her first husband, who married Alice Caroline Seely of St John, New Brunswick in 1904, died in New York in 1928.
