= Elizabeth Beers-Curtis =

American–French heiress and aristocrat (1847–1933)

Marquise de Talleyrand
- Born: Elizabeth Beers-Curtis; November 12, 1847; Paris, France
- Died: March 30, 1933 (aged 85); Rome, Italy
- Spouse: Maurice de Talleyrand-Périgord (m. 1867; div. 1886)
- Children: Marie Palma de Talleyrand Périgord
- Parent(s): Joseph Curtis; Elizabeth Shipton Giles

Elizabeth Beers-Curtis de Talleyrand-Périgord, Marquise de Talleyrand (November 12, 1847 – March 30, 1933) was an American heiress who married into the French aristocracy.

== Early life ==
Elizabeth "Bessie" was born on November 12, 1847, in Paris. She was the daughter of prominent New York merchant Joseph David Beers-Curtis (1825–1870) and Elizabeth (née Elizabeth Shipton Giles) Beers-Curtis (c. 1824–1861). Her younger sister, Josephine Mary Beers-Curtis, was the third wife of Emanuele Ruspoli, 1st Prince of Poggio Suasa and with him, Josephine was the mother of Francesco Alvaro Maria Giorgio Ruspoli, 1st Duke of Morignano and Princess Vittoria Ruspoli, duchess of San Lorenzo.

Her maternal grandparents were Elizabeth (née Ogden) Giles and George Washington Giles, a son of Gen. Aquila Giles, who served alongside George Washington in the American Revolutionary War. Her paternal grandparents were Lewis Agur Curtis and Mary Elizabeth (née Beers) Curtis. Her paternal aunt, Mary Beers Curtis, was married to maternal uncle, William Ogden Giles.

Elizabeth Curtis were members of the "patrician Curtis family" of Murray Hill in New York City and were related to the Hoffmans and Murrays of Murray Hill. Through her father, she was a "descendant of the ancient and honorable Colonial Curtis family of Stratford, Connecticut." Her great-grandfather was Joseph Davis Beers, a Wall Street banker who built the Southern New Jersey Railroad, and she was a lineal descendant of Thomas Welles, the 4th Colonial Governor of Connecticut.

== Society life ==
In February 1892, the Marquise was included in Ward McAllister's "Four Hundred", purported to be an index of New York's best families, published in The New York Times. Conveniently, 400 was the number of people that could fit into Mrs. Astor's ballroom. During the Great War, she hosted a gathering at her residence in Paris to found "an oeuvre on the grand scale for the greater comfort of convalescent officers and soldiers in the war zone." Elizabeth and a number of others became officially involved, including the Marquise d'Andigné (the former Madeline Ives Goddard of Providence), the Countess de Roussy de Sales (also an American), Princess Poniatowski (the former Elizabeth Sperry of California), Mme. Ernest Mallet (the wife of the President of the Bank of France), Mme. la Générale Pau, and Mary Alsop King Waddington (the wife of William Waddington, the former Prime Minister of France).

On her great-grandfather Beers' estate in New Jersey, Elizabeth founded the Chatsworth Country Club, and installed Levi P. Morton, the former Vice President of the United States, and John Edward Parsons as officers. Elizabeth, a friend of Alice Claypoole Vanderbilt was invited to their famous Christmas traditions, in 1901.

== Personal life ==
On March 18, 1867, she was married to Maurice de Talleyrand-Périgord in Nice, France. Maurice was the son of Alexandre de Talleyrand-Périgord, the 3rd Duke of Dino, Marquis de Talleyrand, and Valentine de Sainte-Aldegonde, and the grandson of Edmond de Talleyrand-Périgord. According to their wedding announcement in The Brooklyn Daily Eagle, "Miss Curtis did not change her religion to that of her husband, because the considerable population of the peasantry of the large Talleyrand Prussian estate are Protestants, and are rejoiced at having for having chatelaine a Protestant and an American. They lived together at the new château in the grounds of the demolished Château de Montmorency. Before their divorce on August 11, 1886, they were the parents of:

- Marie Palma de Talleyrand Périgord (1871–1952), who married Mario Ruspoli, 2nd Prince of Poggio Suasa (1867–1963), son of Emanuele Ruspoli, 1st Prince of Poggio Suasa and first wife, Princess Caterina Vogoride-Conachi. Prince Mario was the stepson to Bessie's younger sister Josephine.

In 1887, shocking society, her former husband married the American divorcee Adele Livingston Stevens (née Sampson) (1841–1912) in Paris. His second wife, Adele, was the daughter of Joseph Sampson (a merchant and founder of the Chemical Bank), They also divorced on April 3, 1903.

Elizabeth died at the home of her sister, Princess Ruspoli di Poggio Suasa, in Rome, Italy on March 30, 1933. She was buried in Paris where she had spent most of her life.

=== Descendants ===
Through her only daughter Palma, she was the grandmother of five, including: Costantino Carlo Michele Agostino dei Principi Ruspoli (1891–1942), who married Elisabeth Catherine Adrienne Marie Anne Comtesse van der Noot d'Assche; Marescotti dei Principi Ruspoli (1892–1942), who married Virginia dei Marchesi Patrizi Naro Montoro; Alessandro Edmondo Eugenio dei Principi Ruspoli (1895–1975), who married Marthe-Marie de Pineton de Chambrun; Emanuele Costantino dei Principi Ruspoli (b. 1900), who married Teresa Tomassetti; and Carlo Maurizio Giuseppe Edgardo dei Principi Ruspoli (1906–1947), who married firstly, Marina dei Conti Volpi di Misurata, and secondly Luisa Maria Camperio.
