= John Broome (politician) =

American politician (1738–1810)

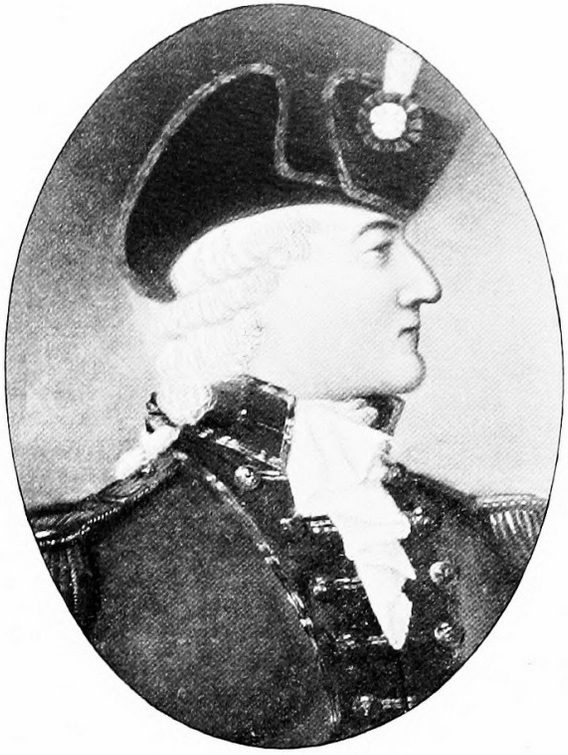
- John Broome as depicted in 1895's Makers of New York.

Lieutenant Governor of New York
- In office July 1804 – August 8, 1810
- Governor: Morgan Lewis (1804–1807); Daniel D. Tompkins (1807–1810)
- Preceded by: Jeremiah Van Rensselaer
- Succeeded by: John Tayler

Member of the New York Provincial Congress
- In office 1775–1777

Personal details
- Born: July 19, 1738 Staten Island, Province of New York, British America
- Died: August 8, 1810 (aged 72) Manhattan, New York, U.S.
- Party: Democratic-Republican
- Spouses: Rebecca Lloyd (m. 1769; died 1800) Ruth Hunter (m. 1806–1810)
- Relations: John L. Broome (grandson)
- Parent(s): Samuel Broome; Marie LaTourette

Military service
- Allegiance: Thirteen Colonies
- Branch/service: New York State Militia
- Rank: Lieutenant colonel
- Battles/wars: Revolutionary War

John Broome (July 19, 1738 – August 8, 1810) was an American merchant and politician who was the lieutenant governor of New York, from 1804 to 1810.

== Early life ==
Broome was born on Staten Island in the Province of New York on July 19, 1738. He was the youngest of four children born to Samuel Broome (1685/93–1771), a staunch Presbyterian, and Marie (née LaTourette) Broome (1693–1774). His maternal grandparents were Jean LaTourette and Marie Mercereau, who were French Huguenots.

Broome studied law with William Livingston, but around 1762 abandoned a legal career to join his brother Samuel in a partnership to import British goods.

== Career ==
In 1775, Broome joined the military for the American Revolution when he was appointed lieutenant colonel of the Second New York City Regiment of Militia, which was commanded by John Jay.

He was a member of the New York Provincial Congress from 1775 to 1777, and a delegate to the New York State Constitutional Convention in 1777.

=== Post-Revolutionary War ===
He was an Alderman in 1783-84 and 1785–86, and New York City Treasurer in 1784. He was the president of the New York City Chamber of Commerce from 1785 to 1794 and was engaged in trade with India and China at that time. He is said to have launched the importation of tea from China with an initial shipment of 2 million pounds.

In August 1795, during an outbreak of yellow fever, he was the chairman of the city's Health Committee, appointed by Governor George Clinton the previous year, and kept on by Clinton's rival John Jay despite Broome's prominence at a partisan rally to oppose the treaty Jay had just negotiated with the British since health was not considered a partisan issue. The health committee denied there was an epidemic and played down the number of deaths, attributing them to other causes.

Broome twice ran unsuccessfully for U.S. Congress; first in March 1789 against Federalist candidate John Laurance, and then again in April 1802 against Federalist candidate Joshua Sands. Broome was a member of New York County of the New York State Assembly in 1800-01 and 1802, and a member of the New York State Senate in 1804.

=== Lieutenant Governor of New York ===
Broome was elected Lieutenant Governor of New York three times, serving from July 1804 until he died in office in August 1810. He initially defeated Oliver Phelps in 1804 and then won re-election over Thomas Storm in 1807 and Nicholas Fish in 1810. He served under two Governors of New York—first under Morgan Lewis (1804–1807), and then under Daniel D. Tompkins (1807–1810). Broome's death occurred a month into his third term, so that at first the President pro tempore of the State Senate John Tayler became acting lieutenant governor, and in April 1811 DeWitt Clinton won a special election to serve for the remainder of the term.

== Personal life ==
On October 19, 1769, he married Rebecca Lloyd (1747–1800) and they had several children, including:

- John Lloyd Broome (d. 1836), who was the father of U.S. Navy officer John L. Broome (1824–1898).
- Julia Adel Broome (1776–1844), who married John Walter Livingston (1778–1860), great-grandson of Philip Livingston.
- Caroline Matilda Broome (1783–1861), who married Darby Noon (1783–1823)

On July 9, 1806, Broome married Ruth Hunter (c.1757–1840), the widow of auctioneer Robert Hunter (c.1735–1800) and mother of State Senator John Hunter (1778–1852).

Like a very large number of New York City residents, Broome held people as slaves.

Broome's remains were initially buried in the churchyard of the First Presbyterian Church in New York on Wall Street in New York City. However, they were moved in the 1840s when the church relocated to Fifth Avenue between 11th and 12th Streets in Greenwich Village in Manhattan.

=== Descendants ===
Through his son John, he was the grandfather of Marine Corps officer John Lloyd Broome (1824–1898).

Through his daughter Julia, he was the grandfather of Adele Caroline Livingston (1810/3–1841), who married New York merchant Joseph Sampson (1793–1872), themselves the parents of Adele Livingston Sampson (wife of Frederic W. Stevens and Maurice de Talleyrand-Périgord) and grandparents of Adele Livingston "Daisy" Stevens (1864–1939), who was married to Frederick Hobbes Allen (1858–1937), a prominent international lawyer who was the son of Elisha Hunt Allen (1804–1883), former U.S. Representative from Maine and the United States Minister to the Kingdom of Hawaii from 1856 until he died in 1883, and the grandson of Samuel Clesson Allen (1772–1842), a Senator from Massachusetts.

=== Legacy ===
Broome County, New York, and the Town of Broome in Schoharie County, New York are named after him, as well as Broome Street in Manhattan in New York City.

Political offices
Preceded by Jeremiah Van Rensselaer	Lieutenant Governor of New York; 1804–1810	Succeeded by John Tayler; Acting
