= Frederick Hobbes Allen =

American lawyer and politician

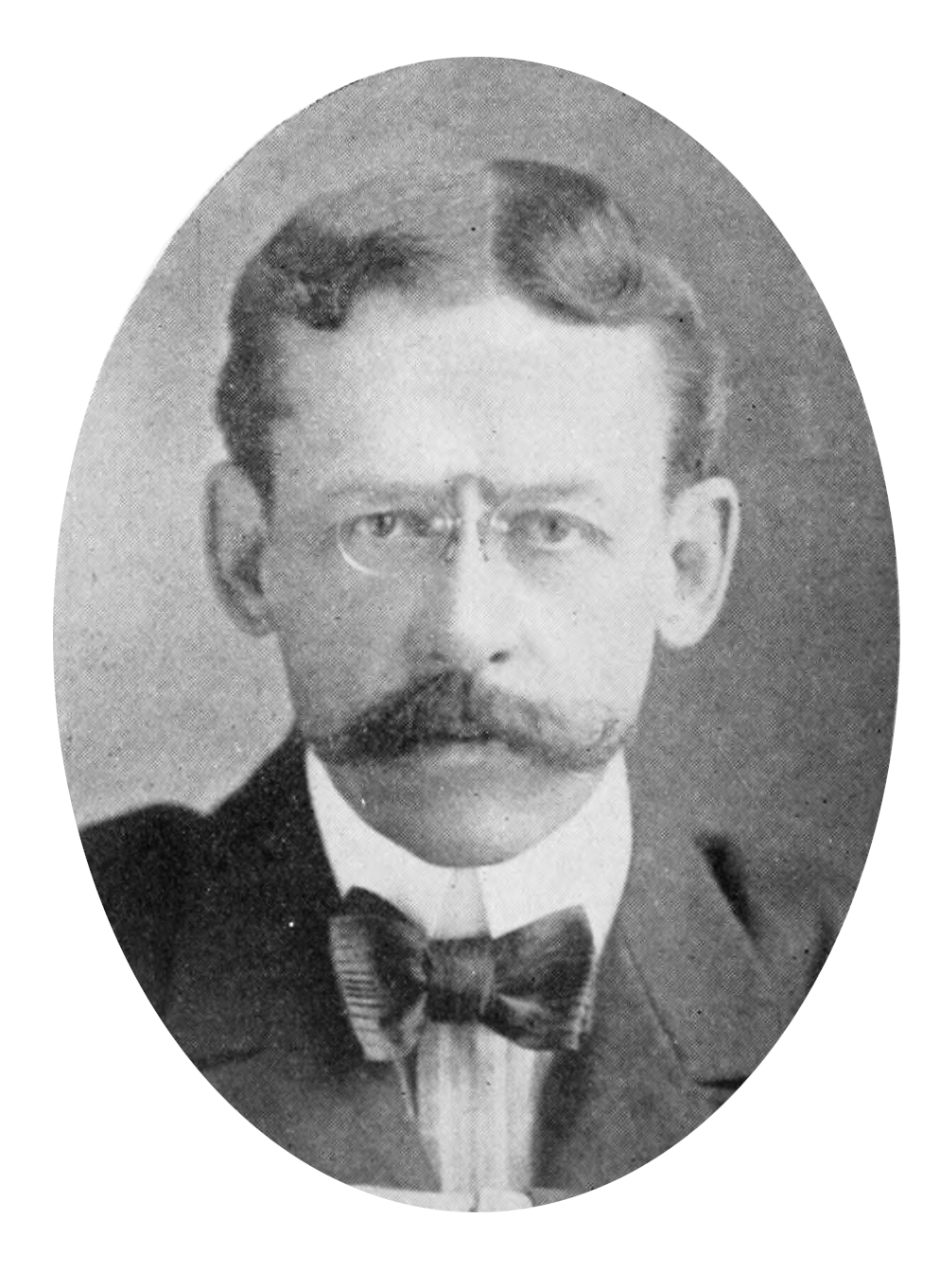

Mayor of Pelham Manor, New York
- In office 1904–1906

Personal details
- Born: May 30, 1858 Honolulu, Kingdom of Hawaii
- Died: December 3, 1937 (aged 79) Newport, Rhode Island, U.S.
- Party: Democrat
- Spouse: Adele Livingston Stevens (m. 1892)
- Children: 6
- Parent(s): Elisha Hunt Allen; Mary Harrod Hobbes
- Relatives: Samuel Clesson Allen (grandfather)
- Education: Harvard University; Harvard Law School
- Occupation: Attorney

Frederick Hobbes Allen (May 30, 1858 – December 3, 1937) was an American international lawyer and naval aviator during World War I who was prominent in New York Society during the Gilded Age.

== Early life ==
Allen was born on May 30, 1858. He was the son of Elisha Hunt Allen and Mary Harrod Hobbes. His father was a former U.S. representative from Maine who was the United States minister to the Kingdom of Hawaii from 1850 to 1853. Elisha Hunt Allen subsequently became an official of the Hawaiian government, serving as minister from Hawaii to the United States from 1856 until his death in 1883, as well as becoming Chief Justice of the Hawaiian Kingdom.

His paternal grandfather was Samuel Clesson Allen, a lawyer who was Senator from Massachusetts, and his maternal grandfather was Frederick Hobbs, a former Maine legislator. He was descended from Edward Allen, who came to Colonial America in 1661, and settled at Northfield, Massachusetts.

His father was sent to Hawaii by President Zachary Taylor to obtain a reciprocity treaty from King Kamahameha III. As his birth was only ten days after Prince Albert of Hawaii, they became close friends and spent a lot of time together. Allen graduated from Harvard Law School, where he earned an M.A. (1880) and an LL.B. (1883).

== Career ==
After graduation, he was admitted to the bar, in 1884, and began practicing law as a clerk at Miller, Peckham & Dixon. In 1883, Allen became secretary of the Hawaiian Legation at Washington, becoming Charge d'Affaires of the group the following year, after the death of his father. From 1890 to 1894, he was with the firm of Cole & Allen. In 1894, he established his law firm of Adams & Allen at 63 Wall Street in New York City, where he was located since. After his partner died, he formed the firm of Allen & Cammann in 1900, practicing with that firm until 1922, at which point, he practiced alone. His legal practice revolved around his role as an adviser on international law to American and foreign banks.

Allen was a Democrat, serving both locally and nationally, including as Chairman of the Democratic County Committee for Westchester County, New York, and Mayor of Pelham Manor, New York. In 1912, 1920 and 1924, he was a member of the Democratic National Finance Committee.

During World War I, Allen served on Gen. John J. Pershing's staff as a Lt. Commander, with the Naval Reserve Flying Corps. In 1913, he was appointed by President Woodrow Wilson's to his Peace Commission that toured Europe "to study agriculture production, distribution and rural credits".

=== Society life ===
In 1888, Ward McAllister chose Allen to lead the cotillion at a Patriarchs Ball, bringing him firmly into New York Society. In 1892, Allen was included in McAllister's "Four Hundred", purported to be an index of New York's best families, that could fit into Mrs. Astor's ballroom, as published in The New York Times. In 1924, they gave a party for Prince Valdemar and his son, Prince Viggo of Denmark at their home in Pelham Manor.

He was a member of the Sons of Revolution, Society of Colonial Wars, the Knickerbocker Club, the Union Club, the Manhattan Club, and the City Club.

=== Residences ===
Allen owned the historic 1838 Bolton Priory in Pelham Manor, New York. The estate was a wedding present to his wife from her mother as she lived there as a student when the home was a school. She had bought it for $100,000 in 1883. In 1917, their home was robbed of $200,000 in jewelry.

In 1928, his wife bought 57 acres of the Hazard Farm in Newport, Rhode Island. She commissioned Frederic Rhinelander King to build them a home in the French chateau style. "The Mount," which was completed in 1930, was built using stone quarried on the land. After their deaths, the home was left to their daughter Priscilla, who sold it to Muriel Vanderbilt and her husband, Dr. John Payson Adams, in 1945.

== Personal life ==
In May 1892, his engagement to Adele Livingston "Daisy" Stevens (1864–1939) was announced in the society section of The New York Times, stating that:

"The engagement has been cabled from Paris of Frederick H. Allen and Miss Daisy Stevens, a daughter of Frederick H. Stevens. Mr. Allen, who is a native of Boston, has lived in New-York for some years, but has never occupied a very prominent position in society, although popular among his friends. Miss Stevens has not the gift of beauty, but has always been liked for her simplicity of manner and good spirits."

On June 30, 1892, Frederick and Daisy married in the Church of the Transfiguration in Manhattan. She was the daughter of Frederick William Stevens and Adele Livingston (née Sampson) Stevens. Her brother was Joseph Stevens, a Rough Rider, and her sisters were Mabel Ledyard Stevens (1872–1959), who married Count Micislas Orlowski, a polish noble, and Frances Stevens, who married the Count de Gallifet, and later, Count Maurice des Monstiers de Mérinville. Her parents had a home on Bellevue Avenue in Newport called "the Cedars." In 1887, shocking society, her mother (the daughter of Joseph Sampson, one of the founding shareholders of Chemical Bank) divorced her father and married Maurice de Talleyrand-Périgord (1843–1917). When the Marquis' uncle abdicated his title, Maurice became the 4th Duc de Dino and her mother became the Duchess of Dino. In 1903, the Duke and Duchess also divorced, and the Duchess kept her title. Together, Frederick and Daisy were the parents of:

- Frederic Stevens Allen (1894–1968).
- Mary Dorothy Adele Allen (1895–1920), who died young.
- Barbara Frances Gallatin Allen (1897–1951), who married Andre M. Vagliano in 1920. During World War I, she joined the American Committee for Devastated France led by Anne Morgan, serving in France from 1917 to 1918, eventually becoming the head of the Committee's motor department, for which she received the Croix de guerre from France.
- Joan Livingston Allen (1898–1964), who married Goodhue Livingston Jr. (1897–1994), son of society architect Goodhue Livingston Sr. (1867–1951), in 1919.
- Julian Broome Livingston Allen (1900–1967), who twice received the Croix de guerre from France.
- Priscilla Alden Sampson Allen (1904–1996), who married Francis Jackson Hallowell (1906–1988), grandson of Col. Norwood Penrose Hallowell of the Union Army.

Allen died on December 3, 1937, at the Newport Hospital in Newport, Rhode Island. He was buried at Beechwoods Cemetery in New Rochelle, New York. His widow also died at their cottage in Newport.

== Honours and awards ==
=== Foreign honours ===
- Czechoslovakia: Commander of the Order of the White Lion (1931)
