= John L. Broome =

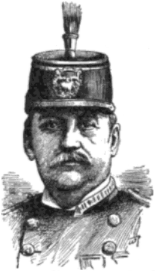
- Born: John Lloyd Broome; March 8, 1824; New York City, U.S.
- Died: April 12, 1898 (aged 74); Binghamton, New York, U.S.
- Occupation: Military officer
- Spouse: Mary Cochran

Lieutenant Colonel John Lloyd Broome, USMC (1824–1898) was an officer in the United States Marine Corps during the American Civil War.

== Early life ==
Broome was born in New York City on March 8, 1824. He was the son of John Lloyd Broome (1771–1836) and Frances Ann (née McGlassin) Broome (1794–1872). His younger brother was William Henry Broome (1831–1876).

He was the grandson of John Broome, the Lieutenant Governor of New York, and Rebecca (née Lloyd) Broome. His aunt, Julia Adel Broome, was married to John Walter Livingston, a great-grandson of Philip Livingston.

== Career ==
He was commissioned a Second Lieutenant in the Marine Corps on January 12, 1848. His 40 years of service included action at Veracruz, Alvarado, and Laguna del Carmen, Mexico, (1848).

He was promoted to First Lieutenant on September 28, 1857, and to captain on July 26, 1861 - shortly after the outbreak of the American Civil War.

During the Civil War he served as senior Marine officer of the West Gulf Blockading Squadron, he played a prominent part in the capture of New Orleans and all engagements of the Squadron on the Mississippi River. He was twice wounded; severely, at the second Battle of Vicksburg.

He received the first of two brevets (honorary promotions) to major on April 24, 1862, for gallant and meritorious services. He second brevet, to lieutenant colonel, on March 14, 1864, was for gallant and meritorious services at the second Battle of Vicksburg to date from July 15, 1863. He was promoted to major on December 8, 1864.

After the war, he became an Original Companion of the Military Order of the Loyal Legion of the United States. He was promoted to lieutenant colonel on March 16, 1879.

Broome retired from the Marine Corps, after 40 years of service, on March 8, 1888. In 1890, he became a Veteran Member of the Aztec Club of 1847.

== Personal life ==
Broome was married to Mary Cochran (1834–1892). Together, they were the parents of:

- George Cochran Broome (1866–1943), who married Mary Orme Keyworth in 1898. They divorced in 1904 and she married Logan Tucker (grandson of Gen. John A. Logan).
- John Hartford Garragut Broome (1869–1870), who died young.
- Mary Gilfillan Broome (1871–1882), who died young.
- Josephine Frances Broome (1874–1876), who died young.

Lieutenant Colonel Broome died on April 12, 1898, in Binghamton, Broome County, New York, where he was buried.

=== Descendants ===
Through his son George, he was the grandfather of Josephine Broome (1900–1954), who married Columba Jamison O'Gorman, on March 19, 1923, in New York City. They divorced and she married Roland Louis Schilling, on September 24, 1929, in Los Angeles, California.

== Legacy and honors ==
- The USS Broome (DD-210) was named for him.
