= Zachariah Allen =

American lawyer (1795–1882)

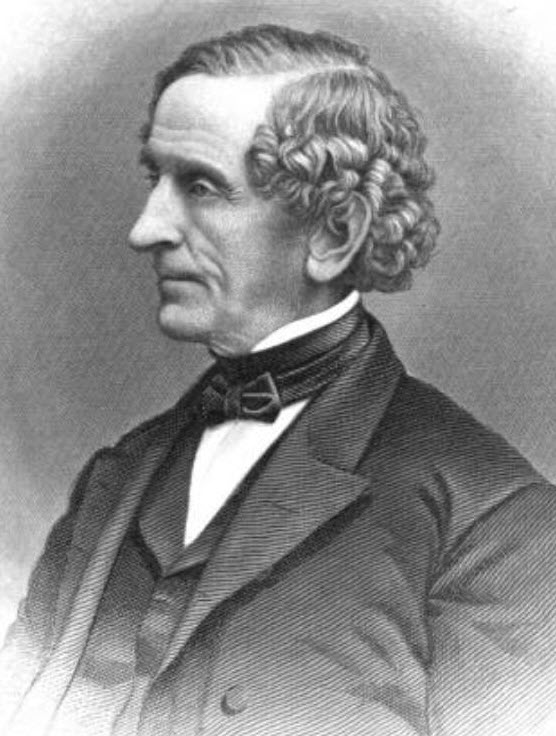
- Born: September 15, 1795; Providence, Rhode Island, United States
- Died: March 17, 1882 (aged 86); Providence, Rhode Island, United States
- Resting place: North Burial Ground; Providence, Rhode Island
- Education: Brown University
- Occupations: Manufacturer, inventor, writer, lawyer

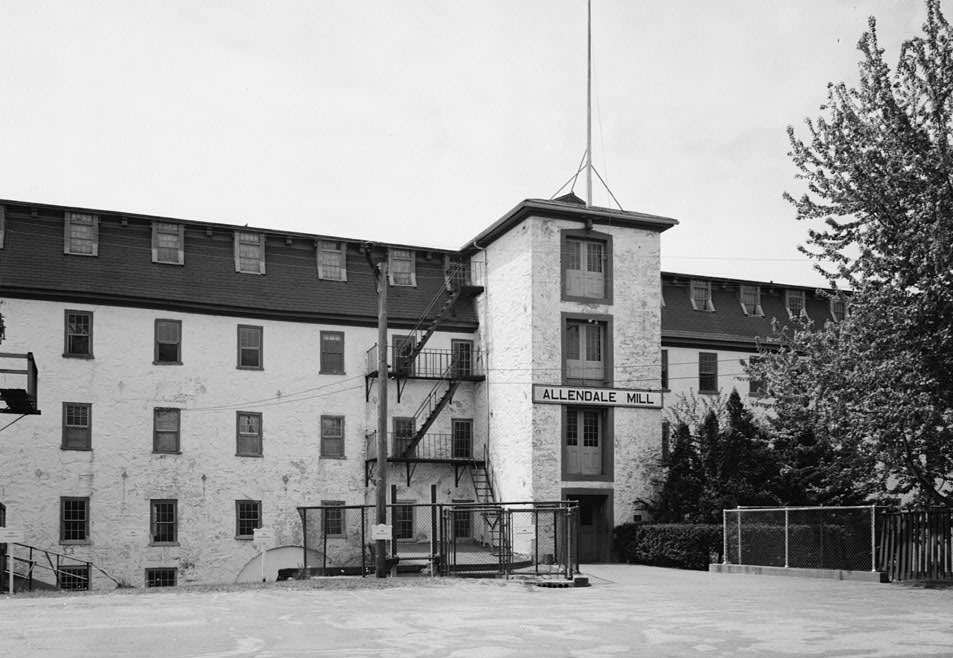
Allendale Mill, 1969

Zachariah Allen (September 15, 1795 – March 17, 1882) was an American textile manufacturer, scientist, lawyer, writer, inventor and civil leader from Providence, Rhode Island. He was educated at Phillips Exeter Academy and at Brown University, where he graduated in 1813.

Allen became a textile manufacturer and, in 1822, constructed a woolen mill in which he incorporated innovative fire-safety features and his own mechanical improvements. He also built the first hot-air furnace system for the heating of homes. In 1833 he patented his best-known device, the automatic cut-off valve for steam engines.

He founded the Manufacturers’ Mutual Fire Insurance Company in 1835, the forerunner of the present day insurance company FM.

Allen was also a prolific writer of scientific texts and wrote numerous books and articles during his lifetime.

== Early life ==
Zachariah Allen was born on September 15, 1795, in Providence, Rhode Island, to Zachariah and Anne (Crawford) Allen. His older brother Philip, served Rhode Island as governor (1851–1853) and later as a United States senator (1853–1859). Allen's father died in 1801, when he was only five years old, so he was mostly raised by his mother, and acquired a love of knowledge, particularly science at an early age. He was educated at a school in Medford, Massachusetts, then later at Phillips Exeter Academy in Exeter, New Hampshire.

Allen's mother, Anne, died in 1808, just a year before he entered Brown University, where he graduated in 1813. Allen later served as a trustee of the University from 1826 to 1882. Upon graduation from Brown, he briefly considered a career in medicine, but instead studied law for two years in the office of James Burrill, and was admitted to practice in the Rhode Island Courts in 1815.

In 1817, Allen married Eliza Harriet Arnold, the daughter of Welcome Arnold, a well-known Providence merchant who had participated in the Gaspee Affair in 1772. The Allens had three daughters, Anne Crawford, Mary Arnold (wife of Andrew Robeson Jr.) and Candace.

== Manufacturer and inventor ==
In 1821, Allen devised a system to heat several rooms of a house from a single stove or furnace with a system of heat-conducting pipes. With the advent of the use of anthracite coal for heating in the 1820s, Allen's system of heating was soon adapted elsewhere.

In 1822, he organized and constructed a woolen mill in North Providence on the banks of the Woonasquatucket River and constructed a series of dams to provide power to the machinery. The Allendale Mill was one of the earliest textile mills in the nation to incorporate so-called "slow-burning" construction, which consisted of a system of cast iron columns supporting large beams covered by heavy wooden planking for the floors and roof and shingles set in mortar, in contrast to the traditional system of lighter joists and thinner flooring.

The mill also contained innovative fire-safety features including first use of heavy fire doors, a sprinkler system, rotary fire pump, and copper-riveted hose to be used on a textile mill in North America.

In 1825, he went to Europe to observe woolen manufactures and later wrote The Practical Tourist about his travels there.

Allen patented an "extension roller" for "raising fobrous naps by teasels" to produce a smooth, glossy finish to woolen cloth. This system would be used in textile mills for many years.

He invented the first practical automatic cut-off valve for steam engines, which was patented in 1833. Allen's invention was later proclaimed "one of the greatest inventions ever made in the steam engines" by Stephen Roper in his 1884 Engineer's Handybook.

In 1852, Allen purchased the 1813 Georgiaville Mill in nearby Smithfield, Rhode Island. He rebuilt the existing mill there and increased the sites water power by raising the dam height of the millpond. He later added steam power and enlarged the mill further. He also built additional dwellings, a church, and a school for the increased work force.

Although Allen went bankrupt in Panic of 1857, he continued to manage the Georgiaville Mills which his brother had bought.

== Mutual insurance ==
About 1834, after he had taken numerous measures to protect his mill from fire, Allen appealed to his insurance company to lower his premiums. The insurance company claimed to "know nothing about his mill, or apparatus" and refused to adjust the premium. Allen studied the problem and in 1835 joined with several other mill owners to establish the Providence Manufacturers Mutual Fire Insurance Company, introducing a system of basing premiums on the effectiveness of safety equipment based on the nature of the business, adequacy of the apparatus and the safe methods of factory construction.

In 1848, Allen formed another mutual insurance company, Rhode Island Mutual Fire Insurance Company to supplement Manufacturers' Mutual.

Two years later, the Boston Manufacturers Mutual Insurance Company was founded by James Read and others, after consultation with Allen. The system of factory mutual insurance would be duplicated in dozens of other locations by the end of the 19th century.

The modern descendant of Zachariah Allen's Mutual Fire Insurance Company, now known as FM maintains its headquarters in Johnston, Rhode Island, not far from the Allendale Mill.

== Community leader ==
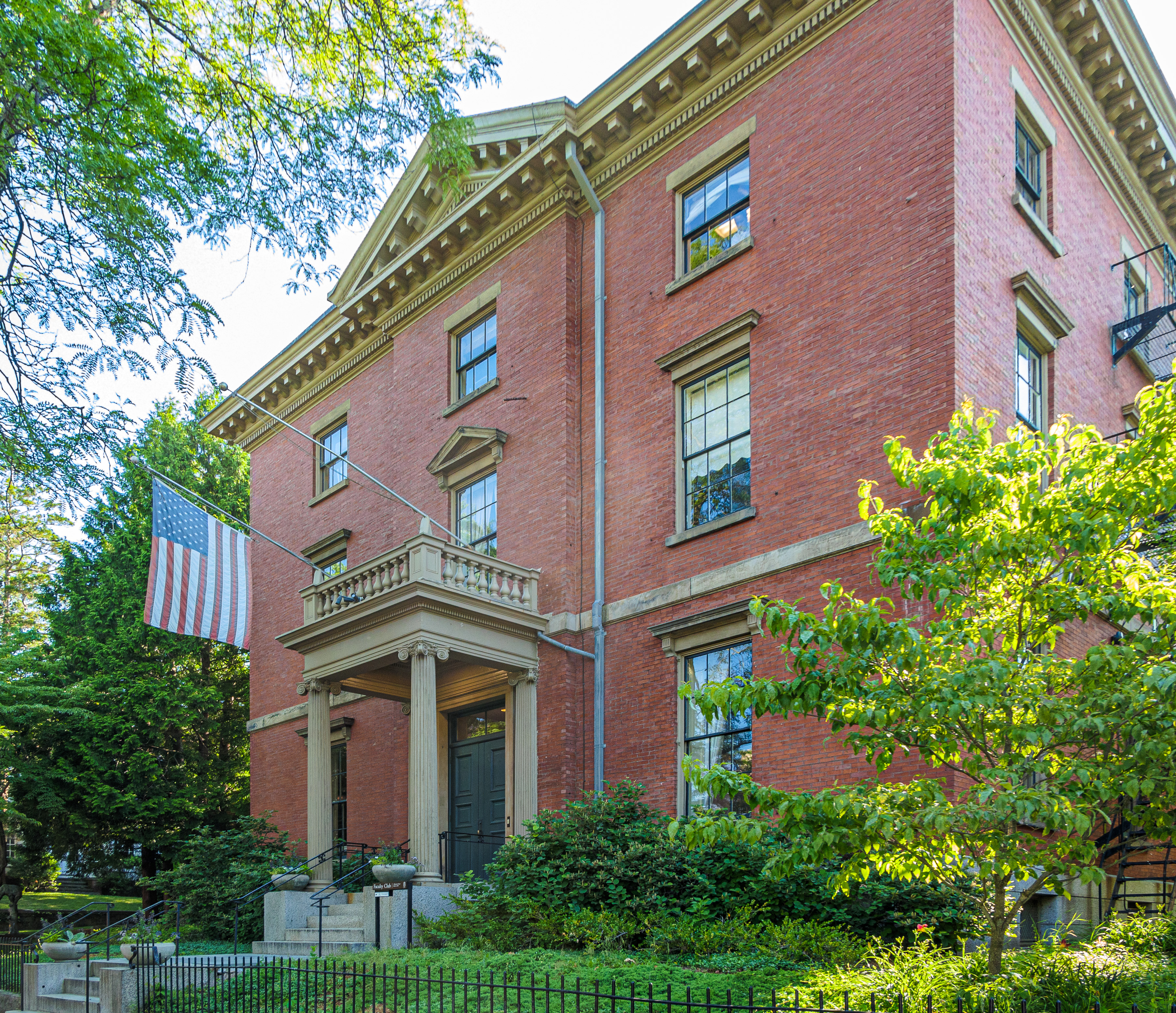
Allen's Providence home, later owned by Brown University

As a member of the town council of Providence from the early 1820s, was influential in introducing the first fire engine in the city. Later he was active and in the planning and construction of city's first water works which opened in 1871.

Allen was one of the founders of the Providence Athenaeum in 1831. He was among the founders of the Rhode Island Historical Society, serving as its president in his later years. He was also a member of the Franklin Society for Promoting the Study of Science as well as the Rhode Island Society for the Encouragement of Domestic Industry.

In support of the working man, Allen was instrumental in the founding of the first free evening school in New England in 1840, and in the establishment of the Providence Association of Manufacturers and Mechanics. In 1845, he became one of the original trustees of Butler Hospital.

He was also active in the establishment of Roger Williams Park, in Providence. He was a member of the Protestant Episcopal Church, and attended St. John's Church for many years.

Zachariah Allen died on May 17, 1882, at his home on Magee Street in Providence. He is buried at North Burial Ground in Providence, where he served as a commissioner for thirty-two years. Mrs. Allen had died in 1873. Magee Street was later renamed Bannister Street, and the house which Allen had built in 1864 was acquired by Brown University in 1938. The building is occupied by the Brown Faculty Club.

== Published works ==
- (1829) The science of mechanics, as applied to the present improvements in the useful arts in Europe, and in the United States of America.
- (1833) The practical tourist, or, Sketches of the state of the useful arts, and of society, scenery, and in Great Britain, France and Holland, Volume 2
- (1844) article "On the Volume of the Niagara River", provided the first calculation of the volume and power potential of Niagara Falls, published in Silliman's American Journal of Science, April 1844.
- (1852) Philosophy of the mechanics of nature, and the source and modes of action of natural motive-power.
- (1876) Bi-centenary of the burning of Providence in 1676: Defence of the Rhode Island system of treatment of the Indians, and of civil and religious liberty., for the Rhode Island Historical Society, April 10, 1876.
- (1871) Historical Sketch of the Improvements in Transmission of Power from Motors to Machines.
- (1879) Solar light and heat: the source and the supply. Gravitation: with explanations of planetary and molecular forces as a sequel to his 1851 book.
