= Allendale Mill =

- U.S. National Register of Historic Places
- U.S. Historic district
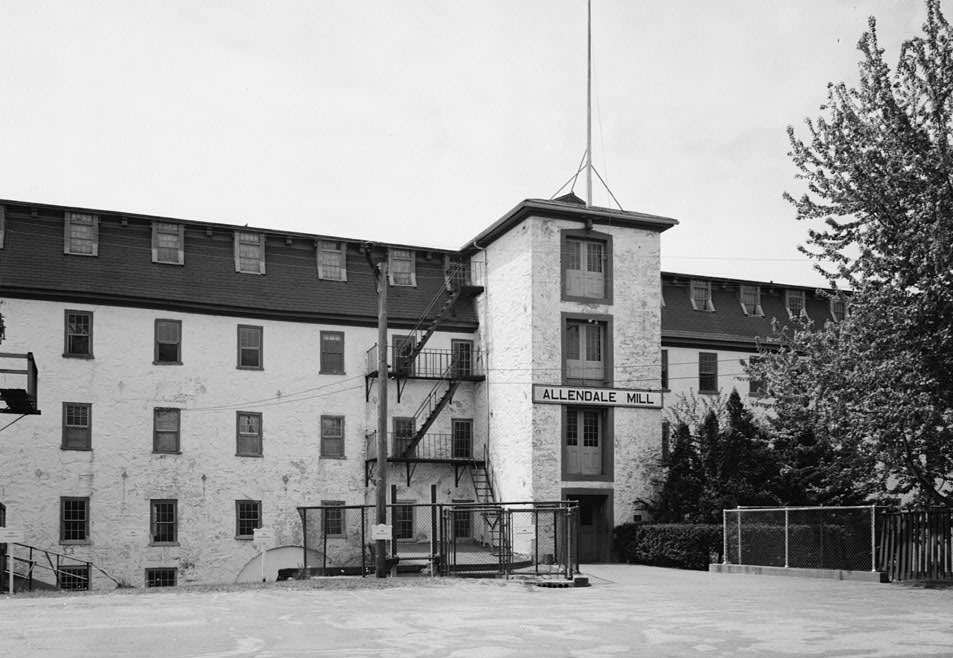
- 1969 view, original building

- Location within Rhode Island Location within the United States
- Location: North Providence, Rhode Island
- Coordinates: 41°51′0″N 71°28′51″W
- Area: 5 acres (2.0 ha)
- Built: 1822
- Architect: John Holden Greene
- Architectural style: Federal
- NRHP reference No.: 73000063
- Added to NRHP: May 7, 1973

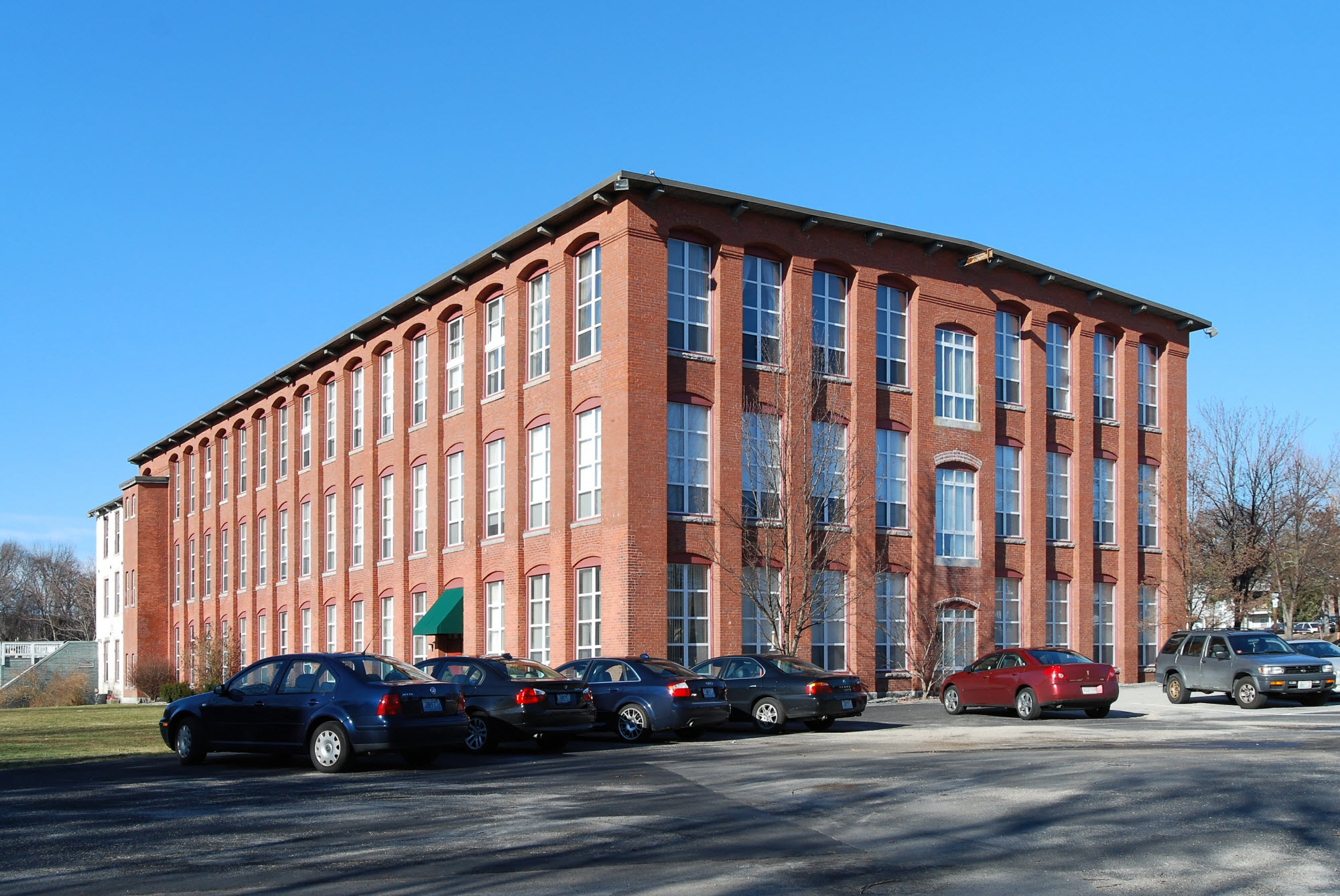
Additions, 1880-1947

Allendale Mill is a historic mill at 494 Woonasquatucket Avenue in North Providence, Rhode Island, on the banks of the Woonasquatucket River.

The oldest buildings in the mill complex were built in 1822 by John Holden Greene for Zachariah Allen. The mill had various fire safety devices that were advanced for the time, including "heavy fire doors, sprinkler system, rotary fire pump, and copper-riveted fire hose to be used in American textile mills. In addition, Allen built a heavy fire wall separating the picker room (filled with highly flammable cotton fibers) from the rest of the mill and set the roofshingles in mortar." The second building, also of 1822, was a company store building. It still stands next to the mill, facing Woonasquatucket Avenue.

Several additions were built onto the original building during the late 19th and 20th centuries. The first was a plain, white, 5-bay section in 1880. Later, two identical 9-bay red-brick additions were built in 1910 and 1947.

The mill's 6 buildings over 5 acres (2.0 ha) were listed on the National Register of Historic Places in 1973.

== See also ==
- National Register of Historic Places listings in Providence County, Rhode Island
