= USS Broome =

Clemson-class destroyer

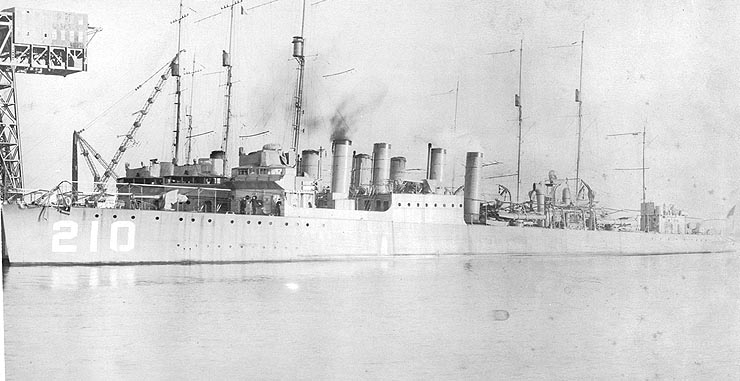
- USS Broome (DD-210) in port, circa 1919–1920.

History

United States
- Namesake: John L. Broome
- Builder: William Cramp & Sons, Philadelphia
- Cost: $892,802 (hull & machinery)
- Yard number: 476
- Laid down: 8 October 1918
- Launched: 14 May 1919
- Commissioned: 31 October 1919
- Decommissioned: 30 December 1922
- Recommissioned: 5 February 1930
- Reclassified: Miscellaneous auxiliary, AG-96, 23 May 1945
- Decommissioned: 20 May 1946
- Fate: Sold 20 November 1946

General characteristics
- Class & type: Clemson-class destroyer
- Displacement: 1,215 tons
- Length: 314 ft 4 in (95.81 m)
- Beam: 31 ft 9 in (9.68 m)
- Draft: 9 ft 10 in (3 m)
- Speed: 35 knots (65 km/h)
- Complement: 122 officers and enlisted
- Armament: 4 x 4 in (100 mm) guns, 1 x 3 in (76 mm) gun, 12 x 21 inch (533 mm) TT.

USS Broome (DD-210/AG-96) was a Clemson-class destroyer in the United States Navy. She was named after Marine Corps Lieutenant Colonel John L. Broome.

== Construction and commissioning ==
Broome was launched 14 May 1919, by William Cramp & Sons, Philadelphia; sponsored by Miss Mary Josephine Heyworth Broome, granddaughter of Lieutenant Colonel Broome, and commissioned 31 October 1919.

== Service history ==
Broome left New York Navy Yard in May 1920 for duty in European waters. She cruised between English and French ports, as well as in the Baltic Sea and Mediterranean. At the end of the year, she reported to the Asiatic Fleet. After two years, she returned to the United States and went out of commission at San Diego 30 December 1922.

Broome was recommissioned 5 February 1930 and thereafter served actively with the fleet in the Pacific until 1939, except for a period in reduced commission during 1934. In May 1939, Broome arrived at Norfolk Navy Yard for duty in the Atlantic. In 1941, she was attached to Destroyer Division 63, Patrol Force, and operated with the Neutrality Patrol on the United States East Coast. Later that year, she served as a convoy escort between Iceland and the United States.

From January 1942 until May 1945, Broome engaged in convoy escort, patrol, and training operations in U.S. East Coast, Icelandic, Canadian, and Caribbean waters. In addition, she escorted several trans-Atlantic convoys to North Africa and the United Kingdom.

== Convoys escorted ==
Convoy	Escort Group	Dates	Notes
HX 152		30 Sept-9 Oct 1941	from Newfoundland to Iceland prior to US declaration of war
ON 26		20-29 Oct 1941	from Iceland to Newfoundland prior to US declaration of war
HX 168		4-10 Jan 1942	from Newfoundland to Iceland
ON 57		25 Jan-7 Feb 1942	from Iceland to Newfoundland
HX 176	MOEF group A1	23 Feb 5 March 1942	from Newfoundland to Northern Ireland
ON 57	MOEF group A1	11–19 March 1942	from Northern Ireland to Newfoundland
CU 2		21 May-5 June 1943	from Curacao to Liverpool
UC 3		10–26 June 1943	from Liverpool to Curacao
CU 3		11–24 July 1943	from Curacao to Firth of Clyde
UC 3A		30 July-10 Aug 1943	from Liverpool to Curacao
CU 4		26 Aug-9 Sept 1943	from Curacao to Liverpool

== Disposal ==
On 4 May 1945 Broome arrived at Charleston Navy Yard for overhaul and on 23 May her designation was changed to AG-96. On 10 June 1945, as a unit of the Atlantic Fleet attached to the Operational Training Command, she reported for duty at Guantánamo Bay, Cuba, where she served until December 1945. On 10 December she proceeded to Philadelphia and commenced her pre-inactivation overhaul. Broome was decommissioned 20 May 1946 and sold 20 November 1946.

As of 2015, no other U.S. Navy ship has been named Broome.
