= FM (insurance) =

American mutual insurance company

- Company type: Private
- Industry: Insurance
- Founded: 1835; 191 years ago
- Founder: Zachariah Allen
- Headquarters: Johnston, Rhode Island, U.S.
- Key people: Malcolm Roberts (President and CEO)
- Number of employees: 5,500
- Website: fm.com

FM (formerly FM Global) is an American mutual insurance company based in Johnston, Rhode Island, United States, with offices worldwide, that specializes in loss prevention services primarily to large corporations throughout the world in the Highly Protected Risk (HPR) property insurance market sector. "FM" is the communicative name of the company, whereas the legal name is "Factory Mutual Insurance Company". FM has been named the "Best Property Insurer in the World" by Euromoney Magazine.

The company employs a non-traditional business model whereby risk and premiums are determined by engineering analysis as opposed to historically based actuarial calculations. This business approach is centered on the belief that property losses can be prevented or mitigated. FM engineering personnel regularly visit insured locations to evaluate hazards and recommend improvements to their property or work practices to reduce physical and financial risks if a loss occurs.

== History ==
During the depression of 1835, Zachariah Allen, a prominent textile mill owner, attempted to reduce the insurance premium on his Rhode Island, USA, mill by making property improvements that he believed would minimize the damage in case of fire. At that time, insurance premium increases for losses were shared among all insureds, regardless of individual loss history. The concept of loss prevention and control was virtually unheard of at the time. To Allen, a proactive approach to preventing losses made good economic sense.

After making considerable improvements to his mill, Allen requested a reduction in his premium, but was denied. He called upon other local textile mill owners who shared his loss prevention philosophy to create a mutual insurance company that would insure only factories with lower risks. This approach should result in fewer losses and smaller premium payments. Whatever premium remained at the end of the year would be returned to policyholders in the form of dividends. The group agreed, and by year's end, formed the Manufacturers Mutual Fire Insurance Company, the oldest predecessor of FM.

During the company's first 14 years, the mill owners and mutual policyholders of Manufacturers Mutual enjoyed an average 50% reduction in premiums compared with the premiums of other insurance companies. The fire prevention methods they developed, monitored by regular fire inspections for mill policyholders, resulted in fewer losses. Despite its initial success, one problem remained for the pioneer mutual insurance company: a single mutual insurance company could not withstand the financial cost of the loss of an entire plant. More insurance capacity was needed. In 1848, Allen formed Rhode Island Mutual.

== Expansion ==
In 1850, Boston Manufacturers Mutual Fire Insurance Company, the third-oldest FM predecessor, was created when Allen convinced a Boston merchant with significant cotton-mill ownership to form his own mutual insurance company with like-minded Boston mill owners. Throughout the next 20 years, other mutual insurance companies were added to the group roster. Together, these companies and the ones that later evolved soon became known as the Associated Factory Mutual Fire Insurance Companies, or the Factory Mutuals, for short.

Loss information helped identify specific industry hazards and was used in developing loss control recommendations for policyholders in similar industries. Such information was shared among all the Factory Mutual (FM) insurance companies, and was utilized by the inspection teams. As the FM companies grew, the inspection workload became difficult to manage. By 1878, the FM companies formed a dedicated unit to handle the collective inspection activities for all the FM policyholders. This unique group of loss control specialists initially provided only inspection services. The group later began performing appraisals and adjustments, loss analysis and research activities associated with preventing fire and other hazards to benefit the mutual insurance company owners and their policyholders. Today, all of these services remain components to FM in the form of engineering and research.

The FM companies' main interests in the late 19th century and early 20th century remained focused on researching and developing products or techniques that would help mitigate property risks and advance the efforts of property conservation. In 1874, a revolutionary form of loss control entered the loss prevention scene: the fire sprinkler. While the invention was originally designed outside the realm of FM, FM's further development and promotion of the sprinkler head aided in its eventual widespread use and acceptance.

FM constructed a training and meeting space in Norwood, Massachusetts that is on the same property as a Four Points by Sheraton hotel. The hotel, which is owned by FM, includes meeting spaces, guest rooms that are available to be booked, and an on-site restaurant, the One Bistro.

== 20th century ==
The beginning of the 20th century brought significant change to the FM companies. Where once the mutual insurance companies focused primarily on the familiar business of textiles primarily within the Northeast region of the US, new companies began to form that sought business beyond the traditional geographical boundaries. These mutuals began branching out into other industries, such as shoe and rubber manufacturers, foundries and light, gas and power companies, while still maintaining their preference for low-risk properties.

During the next 75 to 80 years, the need for more comprehensive policyholder coverage grew, forcing a series of consolidations among the FM companies. By 1987, 42 separate mutual insurance companies had become three: Allendale Mutual Insurance Company, Johnston, R.I., USA; Arkwright-Boston Manufacturers Mutual Insurance Company, Waltham, Mass., USA; and Protection Mutual Insurance Company, Park Ridge, Ill., USA. The three separate organizations found it difficult to deliver competitively priced, value-added engineering services in a marketplace full of increasing competition and a demand for more challenging property protection programs. The three companies were sharing the resources of an inspection group, yet were competing with one another for customers. To reduce competition and costs, in 1998 the CEOs announced their intent to merge the three companies to create FM Global. The merger was completed in 1999.

== 21st century ==
In 2021, FM appointed Malcolm C. Roberts as its president, effective August 1. Roberts became CEO, on January 1, 2022, following the retirement of chairman Thomas A. Lawson as CEO.

FM reported a policyholder surplus of US$26 billion in 2024, with US$1.4 billion returned to clients through membership credits. The company also cited a reduction of US$1.1 trillion in total loss expectancy across its client base."FM 2024 Annual Report". FM Global. 2024-12-31.

== Research Campus and FM Approvals ==
FM's 1,600 acre (648 ha) Research Campus in West Glocester, Rhode Island, USA, conducts testing in fire and explosion hazards, hazards detection. These tests range from witnessing the difference in how products burn to how construction components perform in hurricane conditions.

In 2004, FM entered into a Cooperative Research and Development Agreement (CRADA) with Sandia National Laboratory (US). The CRADA will develop advanced diagnostics and modeling of catastrophic fires.

== See also ==
- Property insurance
- Risk management
