= Andrew Robeson Jr. =

American merchant (1817–1874)

Andrew Robeson Jr. (October 14, 1817 – July 23, 1874) was an American merchant.

== Early life and education ==
Robeson was born on October 14, 1817, in New Bedford, Massachusetts. He was a son of Andrew Robeson (1787–1862) and Anna (née Rodman) Robeson (1787–1848). His father, who was a native of Roxborough, Philadelphia, was a Quaker and Abolitionist, who became a prominent merchant and successful manufacturer in New Bedford under the name Messrs. Robeson & Sons.

His paternal grandparents were Martha and Peter Robeson. His maternal grandparents were Elizabeth (née Rotch) Rodman (daughter of William Rotch) and Samuel Rodman, one of the wealthiest ship owners of New Bedford.

In 1839, Robeson Jr. graduated with a degree in medicine from the University of Pennsylvania in Philadelphia.

== Career ==
In 1840, he joined his father's firm "Andrew Robeson & Sons". From 1848 until his death in 1874, he was in charge of the Print Works at Fall River, Massachusetts. He was also involved in various interests in Boston.

== Personal life ==
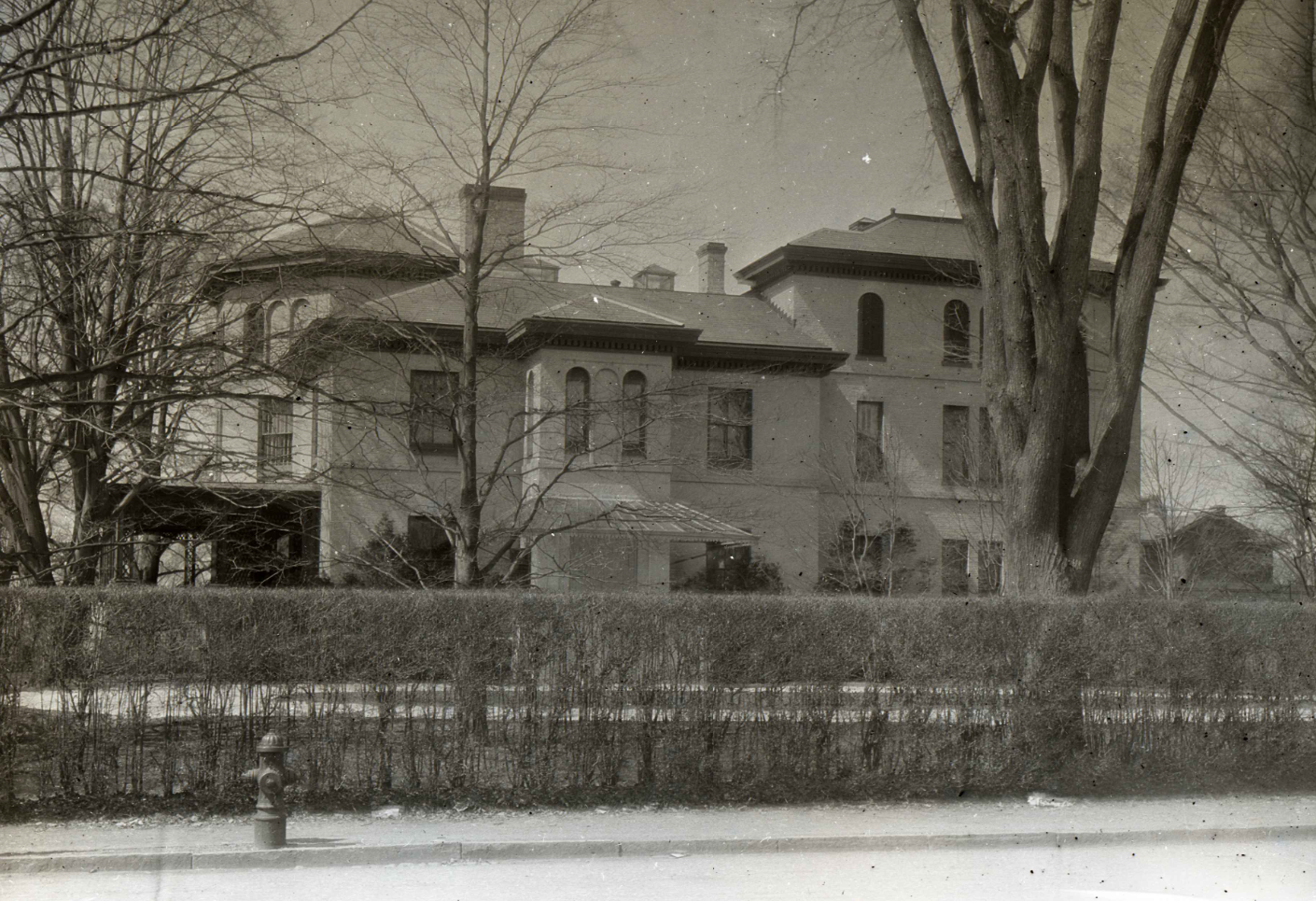
Elm Court, the Robeson family home in Newport, Rhode Island

On March 2, 1843, Robeson was married to Mary Arnold Allen (1819–1903), a daughter of Eliza Harriet (née Arnold) Allen and Zachariah Allen, a prominent textile manufacturer. A year after their marriage, they built a large granite mansion in Fall River situated "on the boundary line between Massachusetts and Rhode Island, with three quarters of the residence situated in the former, and one quarter in the latter." From 1862, he wintered in Boston and later retired to Tiverton, Massachusetts. In 1853, he built a summer home in Newport, Rhode Island which is known today as Elm Court. Together, they were the parents of four children, three of whom survived to adulthood:

- Andrew Robeson III (1843–1906), who married Abby Frances Knight, a daughter of Leonard Knight and Elizabeth Curtis Johnson, in 1880.
- Harriet Allen Robeson (1845–1852), who died young.
- Alice Robeson (1849–1919), who married Stephen Van Rensselaer Thayer, the eldest son of financier Nathaniel Thayer Jr. and grandson of Stephen Van Rensselaer IV, in 1870.
- Mary Allen Robeson (1853–1919), who married Charles Sprague Sargent, a son of Boston merchant and banker Ignatius Sargent, in 1873.

Robeson died in Tiverton on July 23, 1874. He was buried at Mount Auburn Cemetery in Cambridge. His widow died at Islesboro, Maine on July 25, 1903.

=== Legacy and descendants ===
Through his son Andrew, he was a grandfather of auctioneer Andrew Robeson IV.

Through his daughter Mary, he was a grandfather of Henrietta Sargent (1874–1953), who married architect Guy Lowell.

Through his daughter Alice, he was a grandfather of Stephen Van Rensselaer Thayer Jr. (1871–1907), who died in Vichy, France.

In honor of Robeson and his wife, his daughter Alice commissioned Harry Eldredge Goodhue to create stained glass windows for Emmanuel Episcopal Church in Boston, depicting Simeon and Anna.
