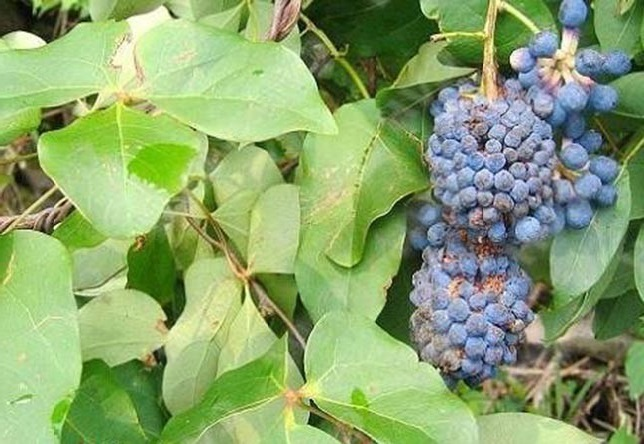
- Sargentodoxa cuneata

Scientific classification
- Kingdom: Plantae
- Clade: Tracheophytes
- Clade: Angiosperms
- Clade: Eudicots
- Order: Ranunculales
- Family: Lardizabalaceae
- Genus: Sargentodoxa; Rehder & E.H.Wilson (1913)
- Species: S. cuneata

Binomial name
- Sargentodoxa cuneata (Oliv.) Rehder & E.H.Wilson (1913)

Synonyms
- Holboellia cuneata Oliv. (1889); Sargentodoxa simplicifolia S.Z.Qu & C.L.Min (1986)

= Sargentodoxa =

Species of flowering plant

Sargentodoxa is a monotypic genus of flowering plants belonging to the family Lardizabalaceae. It only contains one known species, Sargentodoxa cuneata (Oliv.) Rehder & E.H.Wilson.

Its native range is China (north-Central, south-Central and southeast) to Indo-China. It is also found in Hainan, Laos and Vietnam.

The genus name of Sargentodoxa is in honour of Charles Sprague Sargent (1841–1927), an American botanist. He was appointed in 1872 as the first director of Harvard University's Arnold Arboretum in Boston, Massachusetts. The Latin specific epithet of cuneata is derived from cuneate meaning wedge-shaped. Both the genus and the species were first described and published in C.S.Sargent, Pl. Wilson. Vol.1 on page 351 in 1913.

== Gallery ==
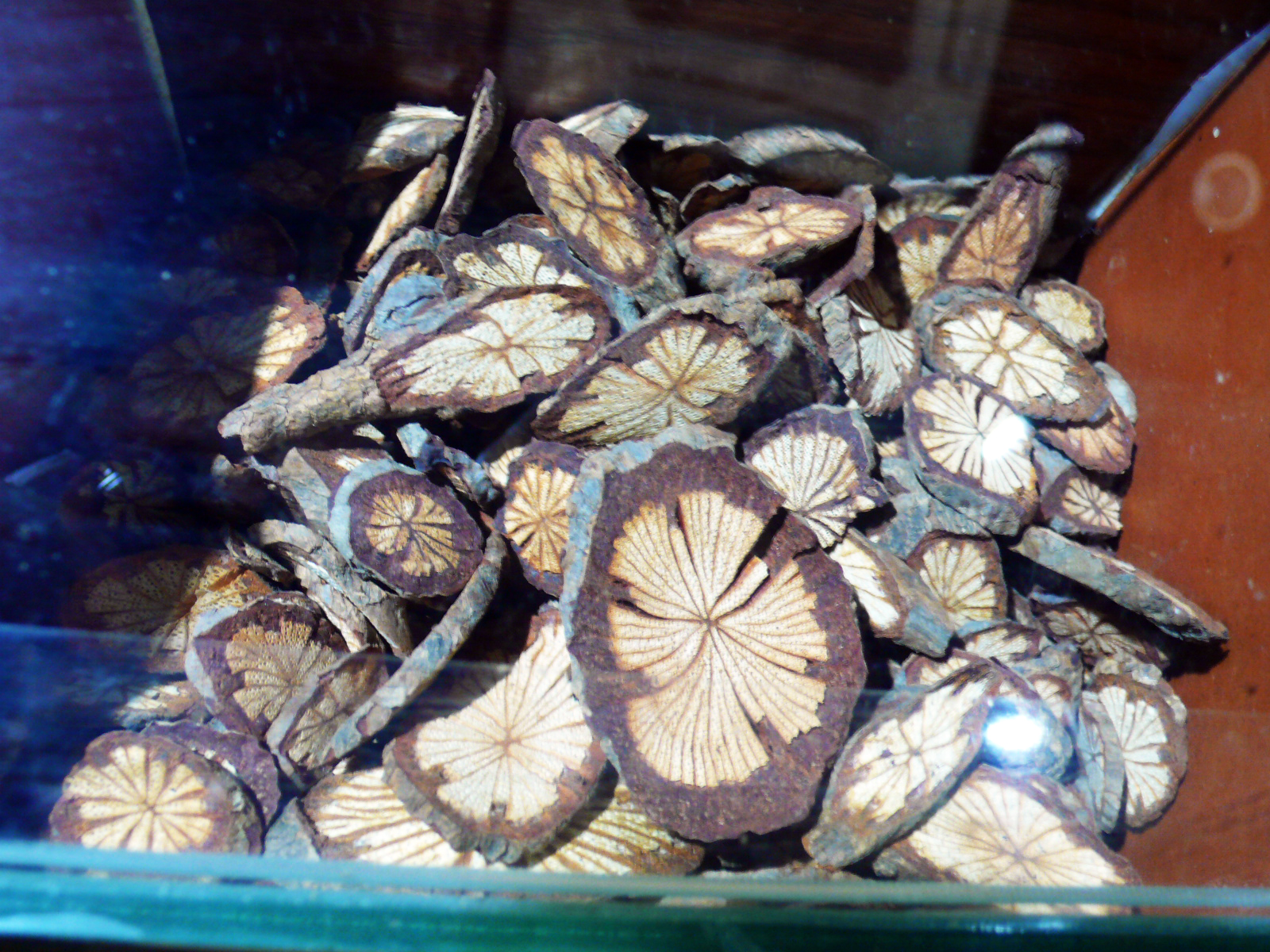
Dried stem of Sargentodoxa cuneata used in Traditional Chinese Medicine.
