= Charles Sprague Sargent =

American botanist (1841–1927)

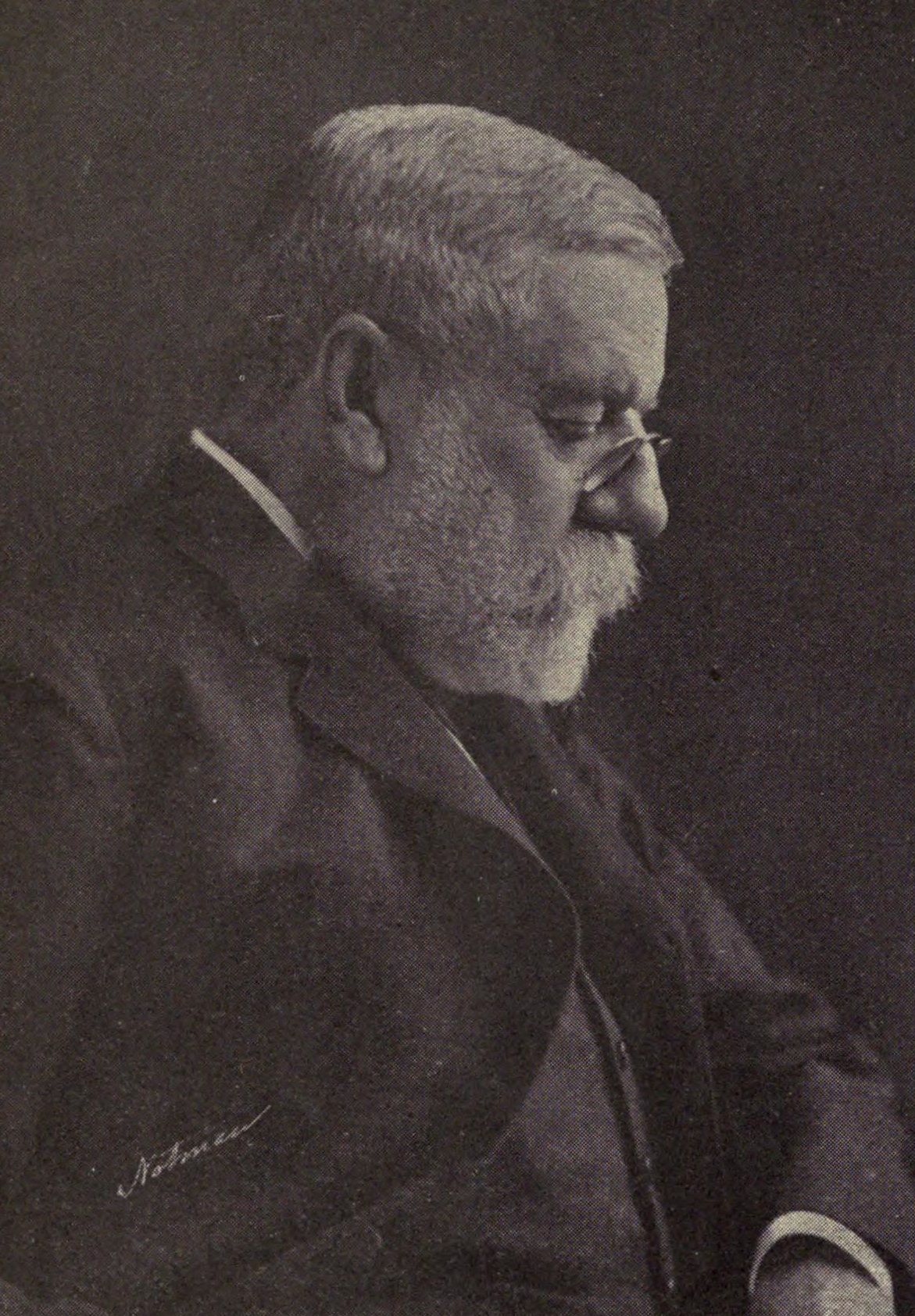
- Born: April 24, 1841; Brookline, Massachusetts, U.S.
- Died: March 22, 1927 (aged 85); Boston, Massachusetts, U.S.
- Education: Harvard College (1862)
- Relatives: Henry Winthrop Sargent (cousin); Andrew Robeson Jr. (father-in-law); Guy Lowell (son-in-law)
- Awards: Veitch Memorial Medal
- Scientific career
- Author abbrev. (botany): Sarg.
- Eponym: Sargentodoxa

1st Director of Arnold Arboretum
- In office 1873–1927
- Succeeded by: Oakes Ames

Charles Sprague Sargent (April 24, 1841 – March 22, 1927) was an American botanist. He was appointed in 1872 as the first director of Harvard University's Arnold Arboretum in Boston, Massachusetts, and held the post until his death. He published several works of botany. The species epithet “Sargentii” that belongs to a number of species demonstrates species that were either discovered, described or named after Charles Sprague Sargent, notably Malus sargentii, Prunus sargentii and Juniperus chinensis var. Sargentii, widely used in bonsai cultivation. The standard author abbreviation Sarg. is used to indicate this person as the author when citing a botanical name.

== Early life ==
Sargent was the second son of Henrietta (Gray) and Ignatius Sargent, a Boston merchant and banker who grew wealthy on railroad investments. He grew up on his father's 130-acre (53-ha) estate in Brookline, Massachusetts.

He attended Harvard College, where he graduated in Biology in the class of 1862. Sargent enlisted in the Union Army later that year, saw service in Louisiana during the American Civil War, and was mustered out in 1865. He traveled in Europe and Asia for three years.

== Career ==
Having returned to his family's Brookline estate, "Holmlea", Sargent took over its management as a horticulturist, influenced by his cousin Henry Winthrop Sargent and H. H. Hunnewell of Wellesley. Under his direction, the family estate became a landscape without flower beds or geometric arrangements, but rather a recreation of nature with winding lanes, overhanging branches, and a profusion of trees and shrubbery.

When in 1872 Harvard University decided to establish an arboretum, Prof. Francis Parkman, at that time a professor of horticulture at Harvard's recently established Bussey Institution, probably suggested his young neighbor Sargent for the position. By the end of 1872, Sargent became the first director of the Arnold Arboretum, a post he held until his death. He was also Director of the Botanic Garden in Cambridge. In 1882, he was elected as a member of the American Philosophical Society.

== Marriage and family ==
On November 26, 1873, Sargent married Mary Allen Robeson (1853–1919), a daughter of Andrew Robeson Jr. They had two sons and three daughters, one of whom married the architect Guy Lowell. Their son Charles S. Sargent went to New York, where he became a partner in a securities firm.

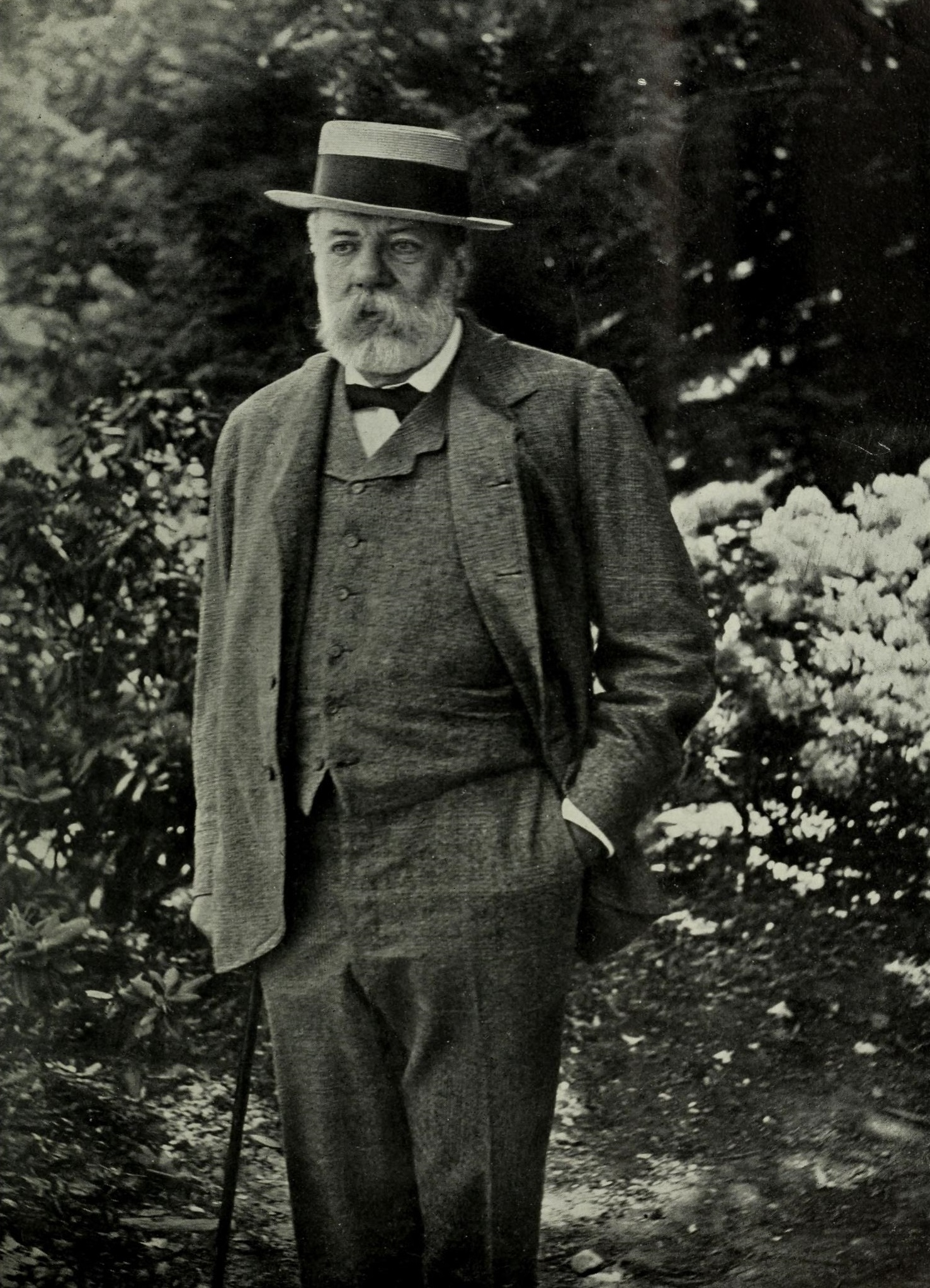
Portrait of Charles Sprague Sargent

== Later career ==
Even by the standards of Boston society of the early 20th century, Charles Sprague Sargent was unusual. He was colder than the surrounding, and notoriously chilly, Boston society; had nothing to do with local government; and cared little for the social ills of his era. He concentrated on his arboretum, and always was at work during his waking hours. At the arboretum he worked with Frederick Law Olmsted, of the Olmsted Brothers, from master planning for the roads and plant collections, to small details such as the selection of tree plantings on Commonwealth Avenue.

In this career, Sargent came of age as a dendrologist and published extensively. His influence was felt nationally on the conservation of American forests (in particular the Catskills and Adirondacks). He was a member of the National Forest Commission (1896–97) under President Grover Cleveland, advising on the creation of 21 million acres of national forest reserves. In that position, he clashed with Gifford Pinchot: Sargent advocated for preserving the forests in a state of "wilderness", while Pinchot advocated for conserving the forests in a way that included "sustainable, productive" uses, including timber "harvests." He was chairman of a commission to examine the Adirondack forests and devise measures for their preservation in 1885.

Sargent became professor of arboriculture at Harvard in 1879. He planned the Jesup Collection of North American Woods in the American Museum of Natural History of New York City in 1880. In the early 1890s he supervised the planting of the extensive conifer collection at the Long Island estate of William Bayard Cutting, then called Westbrook, now the Bayard Cutting Arboretum State Park.

In 1888, he became editor and general manager of the weekly Garden and Forest, "a journal of horticulture, landscape art, and forestry". Garden and Forest was published in 10 volumes from 1888 to 1897 before being discontinued. In 1919, the first issue of the Journal of the Arnold Arboretum was published with Sargent as the editor-in-chief.

He was awarded the Veitch Memorial Medal of the Royal Horticultural Society in 1896.

== Publications ==
These include:

- Catalogue of the Forest Trees of North America (Washington, D. C., 1880);
- Pruning Forests and Ornamental Trees, translated from the French of A. Des Cars (Boston, 1881);
- Reports on the Forests of North America (Washington, 1884);
- The Woods of the United States, with an Account of their Structure, Qualities, and Uses (New York, 1885); and
- The Silva of North America (12 vols., Boston, 1882-1888).

== Legacy and honors ==
In 1913, botanists Alfred Rehder & Ernest Henry Wilson published Sargentodoxa, a genus of flowering plants from China and Indo-China, belonging to the family Lardizabalaceae and was named in Charles Sprague Sargent's honor.

After Sargent's death in 1927, at an Arbor Day memorial ceremony, Massachusetts Governor Fuller planted a white spruce on the grounds of the Massachusetts State House in his memory, and noted:

Professor Sargent knew more about trees than any other living person. It would be hard to find anyone who did more to protect trees from the vandalism of those who do not appreciate the contribution that they make to the beauty and wealth of our nation.
