= Joseph Sampson =

- Born: October 16, 1793; Plympton, Massachusetts, U.S.
- Died: May 21, 1872 (aged 78); New York City, U.S.
- Spouse: Adele Caroline Livingston (m. 1831; death 1841)
- Children: Adele Livingston Sampson
- Relatives: Henry Philip Tappan (brother-in-law)

Joseph Sampson (October 16, 1794 – May 21, 1872) was a 19th-century American businessman and merchant. He was among the founding shareholders of Chemical Bank in 1823.

== Early life ==
Sampson was born in Plympton, Massachusetts, in 1794. He was the son of Rev. Ezra Sampson and Mary (née Bourne) Sampson. His siblings included Ezra Jr., Isaac, Mary and Frances "Fanny". His father was a minister who graduated from Yale College in 1773.

Sampson traced his lineage to Abraham Sampson who had come to Plymouth Colony in 1629–1630 and also to original Pilgrims Miles Standish and John Alden.

== Career ==
Sampson came to New York to work as an apprentice in the auction house of Boggs & Livingston founded in 1800. Sampson would work his way up through the firm which would later be renamed Thompson & Sampson in 1820 and then Joseph Sampson & Co. in 1830. This firm continued under different names into the 20th Century. Sampson was one of the founders of the Chemical Bank, subscribing to one tenth of the capital stock and asking to take more, but it was not thought wise to let any one hold more than that proportion. Already being a director of the Bank of Commerce, he did not serve as such in the Chemical Bank, but was always one of the leading advisers and directors of its policy, visiting it every day and consulting with its officers.

Sampson retired from business at a comparatively early age, but continued to take an active and leading part in the various companies and institutions with which he was connected as director. He was at the time of his death, in 1872, a director in the New York Life Insurance and Trust Company, the Bank of Commerce, the New York Gas Light Company, and the Eagle Fire Company, in most of which, if not in all, he was the largest stockholder.

In 1840, Sampson acquired to the house built by the banker Samuel Ward III (father of Samuel Ward IV) at the corner of Broadway and Bond Street. Sampson paid $70,000 for this property, leading John Jacob Astor to remark that he "did not know that there was any one in New York who could afford to pay such a price for a residence".

== Personal life ==
On June 25, 1831, Sampson was married to Adele Caroline Livingston. She was the daughter of Julia Adel Broome and John Walter Livingston, a great-grandson of Philip Livingston. Adele's maternal grandfather was John Broome, who served as Lieutenant Governor of New York from 1804 to 1810, and her sister was Julia Livingston, who married the Rev. Henry Philip Tappan. His wife died approximately a week after she gave birth to their daughter:

- Adele Livingston Sampson (1841–1912), who married Frederic W. Stevens (1839–1928). In 1887, shocking society, she divorced Stevens and married Maurice de Talleyrand-Périgord (1843–1917), who became the 4th Duke of Dino, making her the Duchess of Dino. They were divorced in 1903.

Sampson died on May 21, 1872, at his residence at 2 Bond Street in Manhattan.

=== Descendants ===
Through his daughter, Sampson was the grandfather of:

- Joseph Stevens, a Rough Rider;
- Mabel Ledyard Stevens (1872–1959), who married Count Micislas Orlowski (1865–1929), a Polish nobleman;
- Frances Stevens, who married the Count de Gallifet, and later, Count Maurice des Monstiers de Mérinville;
- Adele Livingston "Daisy" Stevens (1864–1939), who was married to Frederick Hobbes Allen (1858–1937), a prominent international lawyer who was the son of Elisha Hunt Allen (1804–1883), former U.S. Representative from Maine and the United States Minister to the Kingdom of Hawaii from 1856 until his death in 1883, and the grandson of Samuel Clesson Allen (1772–1842), a Senator from Massachusetts.
