= Château de Montmorency (Montigny-en-Ostrevent) =

Former castle in France

Coordinates: 50°22′04″N 3°11′08″E

Château de Montmorency

The Château de Montmorency is a former castle in the commune of Montigny-en-Ostrevent in the Nord département of France. Today, it comprises a farm, a restaurant and an equestrian centre.

== History ==
The castle on this site probably dates from before 1150. Around 1130, Robert I, named Montigny, built a stone tower on a motte created on marshy, wooded land. Its defences were strengthened over time. In the 13th century, the construction of an entrance between two towers provided scope for crossfire. It was partly destroyed during the Hundred Years' War.

The castle stayed the property of the Montigny family until Robert VII de Montigny was killed at the Battle of Agincourt in 1415. The property then went to the Hornes and later the Montmorency family. These families rebuilt the castle into a stately home rather than a military building. In the 16th century, the Montmorencys added a brick top floor, used as a dovecote, to the gatehouse. In 1570, the castle was confiscated by Philip II of Spain from Floris de Montmorency. In 1598, it was returned to Floris' sister, Eléonore de Montmorency. The ownership of the Montmorencys was disputed, so it was sold to Marguerite de Lalaing. who gave the castle in 1626 to the canonesses of Berlaymont. In 1789, during the French Revolution, the castle was declared state property and sold in 1793 to the Dovillers family, who converted it into a farm.

== Protection ==
According to the minutes of the Historic Commission of the Nord département, in October 1928 the Commission agreed to request the classification of the gatehouse as a monument historique. The entrance flanked by two towers has been listed since 1929 by the French Ministry of Culture.

== Modern use ==
In 1985, l’Établissement et service d’aide par le travail (ESAT) de Montigny moved into the castle. ESAT provides vocational training to handicapped workers, including catering and work with horses. The castle is freely open to visitors.

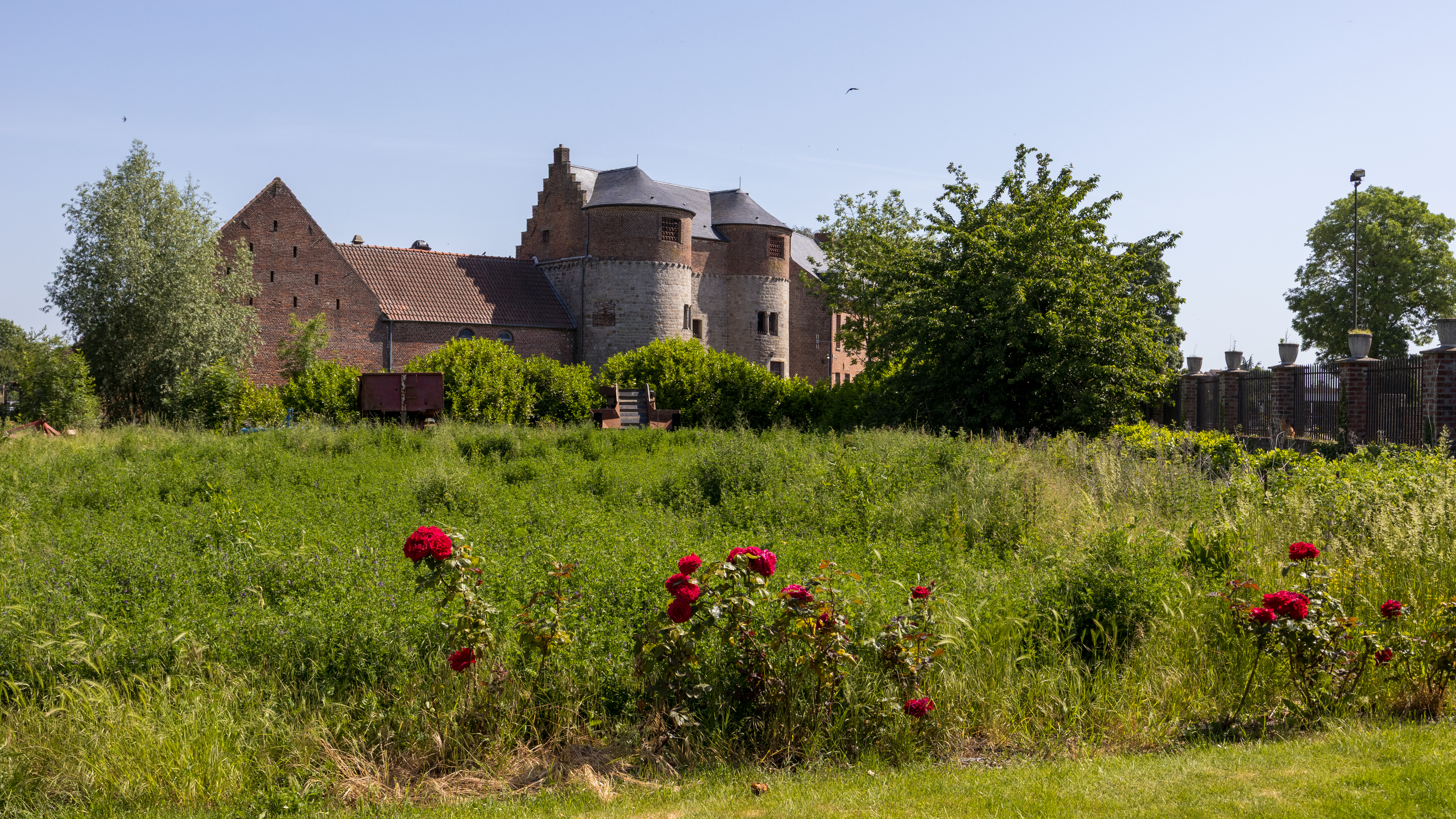
Overview

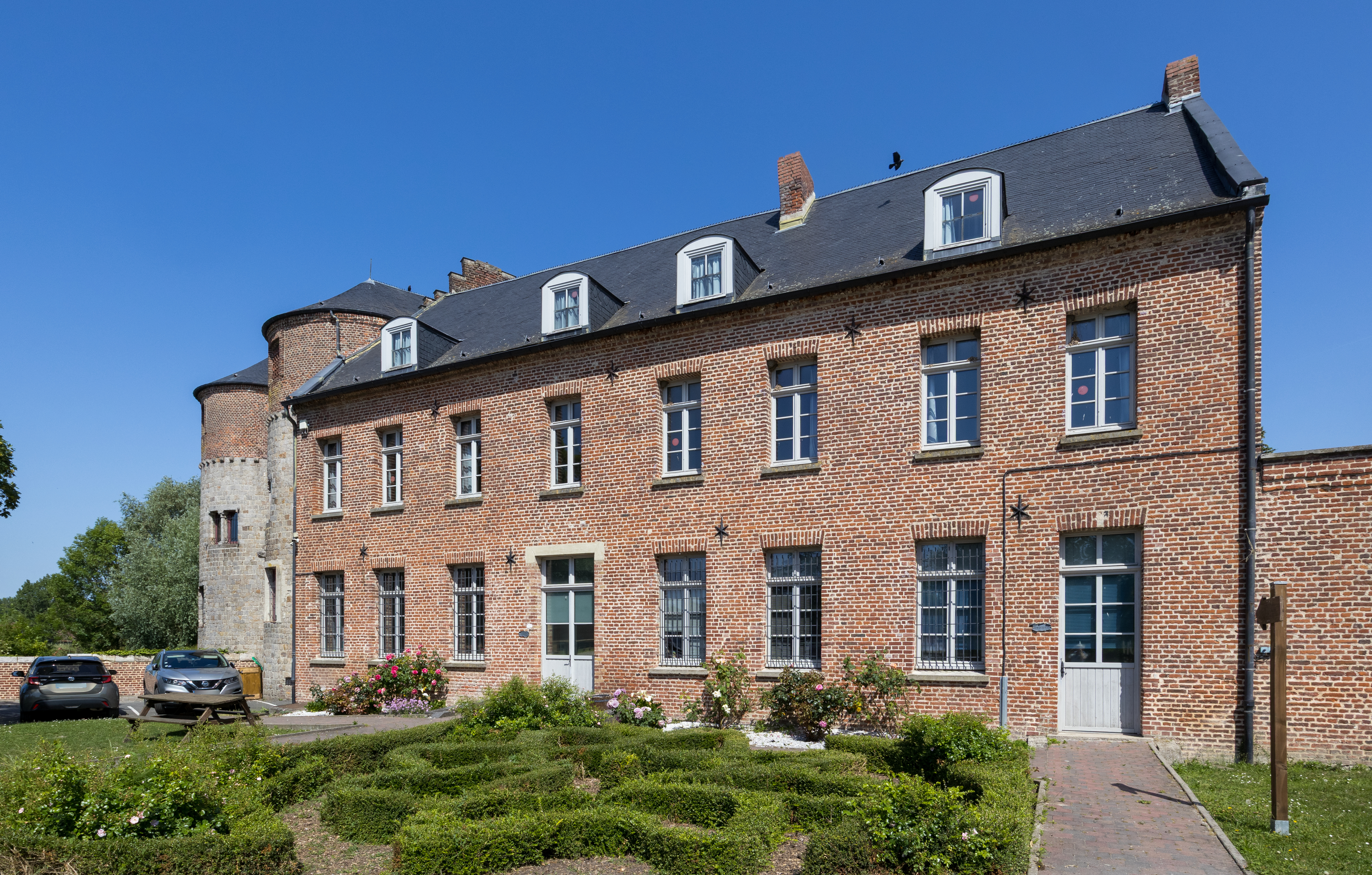
ESAT

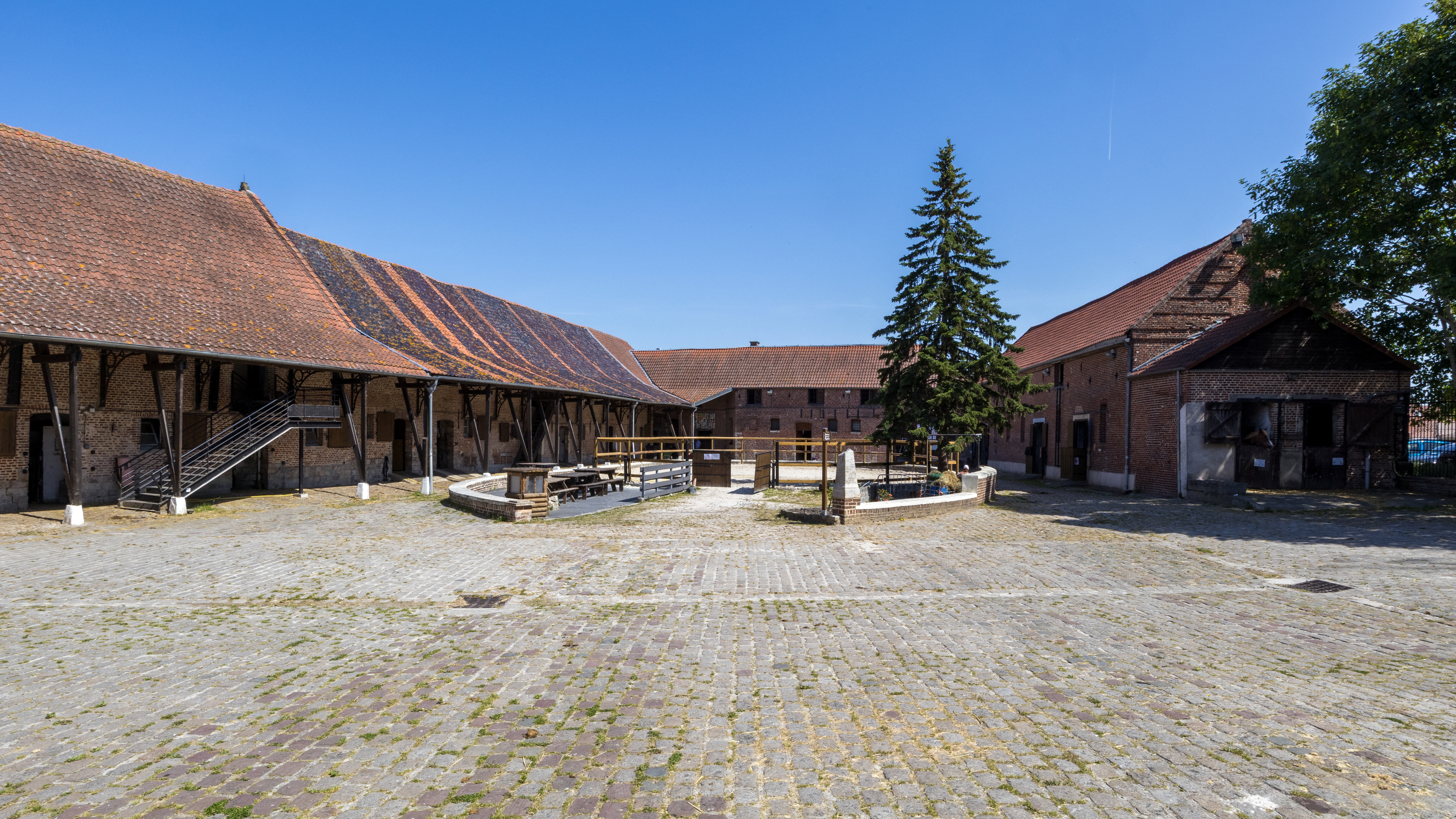
The old farm

== See also ==
- List of castles in France
