= Valentine de Sainte-Aldegonde =

French noble lady (1820-1891)

- Born: 29 May 1820
- Died: 23 September 1891 (aged 71)
- Spouse: Alexandre Edmond de Talleyrand-Périgord
- Issue: 6, including Maurice de Talleyrand-Périgord
- Father: Count Charles Camille de Sainte-Aldegonde

Marie Valentine Joséphine de Sainte-Aldegonde, Duchess of Dino (29 May 1820 – 23 September 1891) was the wife of Alexandre Edmond de Talleyrand-Périgord, 3rd Duke of Dino, and mistress of Anatoly Nikolaievich Demidov, 1st Prince of San Donato.

== Early life ==
She was the daughter of Count Charles Camille de Sainte-Aldegonde and Adélaïde Joséphine de Bourlon de Chavange. Her father was a brigadier general and officer of the Grand Officer of the Legion d'Honneur.

== Personal life ==
On 8 October 1839 she married Alexandre Edmond de Talleyrand-Périgord, Duke of Dino, son of Edmond de Talleyrand-Périgord, Duke of Talleyrand and Princess Dorothea of Courland, at the Château de Beauregard at Cellettes (Loir-et-Cher), her mother's property. With Talleyrand-Périgord, Valentine had six children, of whom four survived:

- Clémentine Marie Wilhelmine de Talleyrand-Périgord (1841–1881), who married Count Alexandre Orlowski.
- Charles Maurice Camille de Talleyrand-Périgord (1843–1917), 4th duke of Dino, 2nd marquis de Talleyrand.
- Elisabeth Alexandrine Florence de Talleyrand-Périgord (1844–1880), who married Count Hans von Oppersdorff.
- Archambault Anatole Paul de Talleyrand-Périgord (1845–1918), 3rd marquis de Talleyrand.

Valentine died on 23 September 1891.

=== Relationship with Demidov ===
Valentine had a passionate admirer, Anatoly Nikolaievich Demidov, 1st Prince of San Donato, a Russian industrialist, diplomat and arts patron of the Demidov family. Anatoly attended her wedding and even helped assist the event. He offered her a diamond ornament whose magnificence caused the bridegroom worry. The next year, in 1840, Demidov briefly broke off their liaison due to financial problems, but later that same year married Princess Mathilde Bonaparte and resumed his affair with Valentine on his first stay in Paris after his wedding. In 1845, he arranged for Valentine to settle with him in Florence and stayed by her side, even though her husband took umbrage. At a costume ball, Valentine was insulted by her rival, Mathilde, and in response Demidov slapped his wife twice in public, which signalled their final separation soon thereafter.
