= Maurice de Talleyrand-Périgord =

French nobility (1843-1917)

Charles Maurice Camille de Talleyrand-Périgord
- Duke of Dino, Marquis de Talleyrand
- Born: 25 January 1843; Paris, France
- Died: 5 January 1917 (aged 73); Monte Carlo, Monaco
- Spouses: Elizabeth Beers-Curtis (m. 1867; div. 1886) Adele Livingston Sampson Stevens (m. 1887; div. 1903)
- Issue: Marie Palma de Talleyrand-Périgord
- Father: Alexandre de Talleyrand-Périgord
- Mother: Valentine de Sainte-Aldegonde

Charles Maurice Camille de Talleyrand-Périgord, 4th Duke of Dino, 2nd Marquis de Talleyrand (25 January 1843 – 5 January 1917) was a French aristocrat, soldier, and author.

== Early life ==
He was born on 25 January 1843 in Paris, France. He was the son of Alexandre de Talleyrand-Périgord (1813–1894), who was styled 3rd Duke of Dino, 1st Marquis de Talleyrand, and Valentine de Sainte-Aldegonde (1820–1891). His older sister, Clémentine Marie Wilhelmine, was married to Count Alexandre Orlowski, and his younger sister, Elisabeth Alexandrine Florence, was married to Count Hans d'Oppersdorff. His younger brother was Archambaud Anatole Paul de Talleyrand-Périgord.

His paternal grandfather was Edmond de Talleyrand-Périgord, 2nd Duke of Dino. Among his prominent family members were his uncle Louis de Talleyrand-Périgord and his aunt Pauline de Talleyrand-Périgord (who married Henri de Castellane). His grandfather was the nephew of Charles-Maurice de Talleyrand-Périgord, the first Prime Minister of France (under Louis XVIII) and the French Ambassador to the United Kingdom (under Louis Philippe I).

== Career ==
A soldier, he served in the Franco-Mexican War and the Franco-Prussian War in 1870. During the Battle of Champigny, he distinguished himself and was put forward for the Cross of the Legion of Honour. However, he declined the honour after it was bestowed upon him due to the fact that his younger brother was serving against France as a captain of the Prussian cavalry.

Upon the resignation of his father in January 1887, he became the 4th Duke of Dino. The U.S. heir Rutherfurd Stuyvesant donated the funds to the Metropolitan Museum of Art to purchase the Duke's collection of ancient armour.

== Personal life ==
On 18 March 1867, he was married to Elizabeth "Bessie" Beers-Curtis (1847–1933) in Nice, France. She was the daughter of Joseph David Beers-Curtis and his wife, Elizabeth (née Shipton Giles). They lived together at the new château in the grounds of the demolished Château de Montmorency. Before their divorce on 11 August 1886, they were the parents of:

- Marie Pauline "Palma" de Talleyrand-Périgord (1871–1952), who married Mario Ruspoli, 2nd Prince of Poggio Suasa (1867–1963), son of Emanuele Ruspoli, 1st Prince of Poggio Suasa and his first wife, Princess Caterina Vogoride-Conachi. The 1st Prince of Poggio Suasa's third wife was Josephine Mary Beers-Curtis, Bessie's younger sister.

On 25 January 1887, shocking society, he married the U.S. divorcée Adele Livingston Stevens (née Sampson; 1841–1912) in Paris. Adele, the daughter of Joseph Sampson (a merchant and co-founder of the Chemical Bank – the precursor to JPMorgan Chase) and Adele Sampson (née Livingston, of the prominent U.S. Livingston family), was the former wife of Frederick William Stevens (1839–1928). They divorced on 3 April 1903.

The Duke of Dino died at the Villa Périgord in Monte Carlo on 5 January 1917. After his death, his younger brother became the 3rd Marquis de Talleyrand.

=== Descendants ===
Through his only daughter Palma, he was the grandfather of five, including:

- Costantino Carlo Michele Agostino dei Principi Ruspoli (1891–1942), who married Elisabeth Catherine Adrienne Marie Anne Comtesse van der Noot d'Assche;
- Marescotti dei Principi Ruspoli (1892–1942), who married Virginia dei Marchesi Patrizi Naro Montoro;
- Alessandro Edmondo Eugenio dei Principi Ruspoli (1895–1975), who married Marthe-Marie de Pineton de Chambrun;
- Emanuele Costantino dei Principi Ruspoli (b. 1900), who married Teresa Tomassetti;
- Carlo Maurizio Giuseppe Edgardo dei Principi Ruspoli (1906–1947), who married firstly, Marina dei Conti Volpi di Misurata, and secondly Luisa Maria Camperio.
