= Duke of Dino =

Noble title of the Kingdom of Naples

Duke of Dino (Italian: Duca di Dino) was a noble title of the Kingdom of Naples, later the Kingdom of the Two Sicilies.

The title referred to the island of Dino in the Tyrrhenian Sea, off Praia a Mare in Calabria. It was created on 9 November 1815 by King Ferdinand for the French diplomat and statesman Charles-Maurice de Talleyrand-Périgord, in recognition of his service at the Congress of Vienna.

Talleyrand ceded the title to his nephew Edmond on 2 December 1817. To prevent the breakup of the estates, Edmond ceded the Dino property to his second son Alexandre (husband of Valentine de Sainte-Aldegonde), while his elder son Louis was styled Duke of Valençay and later inherited the Duchy of Sagan. Alexandre in turn ceded the property to his elder son Maurice. Alexandre and Maurice were styled Duke of Dino, but the transfer of the associated property within the family had no power to alter the order of succession according to the original patent. The senior descendant of Edmond was confirmed as Duke of Dino by the King of Italy in 1912, the Kingdom of the Two Sicilies having ended in 1861 during the process of Italian unification.

The last male heir to the titles died in 1968. In 1975, the exiled former King of Italy Umberto II issued a diploma confirming Manuel Gonzalez de Andia, Marquis of Villahermosa as Duke of Dino, with a remainder failing male issue to his elder daughter Maria Louisa and her husband. Manuel was the son of Luis Dreyfus y Gonzalez de Andia, Marquis of Villahermosa (son of Auguste Dreyfus by his second wife) and Félicie de Talleyrand-Périgord, sister of the last Duke. His daughter Maria Louisa assumed the title until her death in 2015, when it passed to her older surviving son, Javier de Villegas y Gonzalez de Andia.

== Family tree of the Dukes of Dino ==
Charles-Daniel de Talleyrand-Périgord; 1734–1788
Charles Maurice de Talleyrand-Périgord; 1754–1838; 1st Duke of Dino, 9 November 1815	Archambaud de Talleyrand-Périgord; 1762–1838
Edmond de Talleyrand-Périgord; 1787–1872; 2nd Duke of Dino, 2 December 1817
Louis de Talleyrand-Périgord; 1811–1898 de jure 3rd Duke of Dino	Alexandre de Talleyrand-Périgord; 1813–1894 styled 3rd Duke of Dino, 1838
Boson de Talleyrand-Périgord; 1832–1910 de jure 4th Duke of Dino	Maurice de Talleyrand-Périgord; 1843–1917 styled 4th Duke of Dino, 25 June 1887	Archambaud de Talleyrand-Périgord; 1845–1918
Hélie de Talleyrand-Périgord; 1859–1937; 5th Duke of Dino confirmed by the King of Italy, 10 July 1912	Boson de Talleyrand-Périgord; 1867–1952; 6th Duke of Dino	Félicie de Talleyrand-Périgord; 1878–1981	Hélie de Talleyrand-Périgord; 1882–1968; 7th Duke of Dino
Manuel Gonzalez de Andia; 1909–2005; 8th Duke of Dino confirmed by ex-King of Italy, 15 December 1975
Maria Louisa Gonzalez de Andia; 1932–2015; 9th Duchess of Dino
Javier de Villegas y Gonzalez de Andia; 1961– 10th Duke of Dino
