= Pourtalès family =

Swiss noble family of French Huguenot origin

de Pourtalès Family
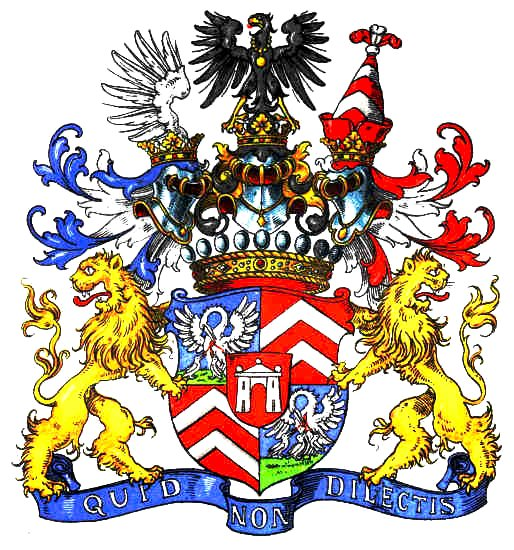
- Country: Kingdom of Prussia; France
- Origin: Languedoc

The de Pourtalès family is a Swiss family of French origin, which has spread in modern times to Germany, France, and the United States. It originates from the Cévennes and is of Calvinist faith. At the beginning of the 18th century, it settled in Neuchâtel, Switzerland, where, thanks to its success in industry and trade, it was ennobled in 1750 by the King of Prussia. It subsequently distinguished itself in Switzerland and Germany. Acquiring various castles and building a network of alliances, it provides a good example of the success of a Huguenot family that emigrated following the revocation of the Edict of Nantes in 1685. One branch has taken root in the United States.

== History ==
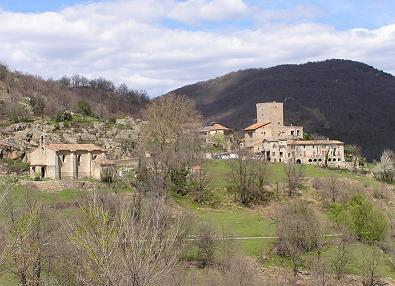
Saint-Roman-de-Codières (France).

The earliest representatives are mentioned in the hamlet of Castanet des Perdus in Saint-Roman-de-Codières, in the Gard, where they were forestry operators before engaging in trade and moving to Lasalle, a neighboring village.

Around 1717, Jean Pourtalès (1669–1739), son of Paul Pourtalès, a fustier (forestry operator) in the hamlet of Castanet des Perdus in Saint-Roman-de-Codières, the cradle of his paternal family, and four of his sons left their village of Lasalle and traveled across Europe in search of a more welcoming land for followers of the Reformed religion.

After a stay in Geneva and then London, they settled in Neuchâtel. In this city, two of the sons, Louis and Jérémie, made their fortune in the manufacture and trade of fabrics.

Jérémie de Pourtalès, a Reformed Protestant from Lasalle who had abjured under duress following the revocation of the Edict of Nantes, emigrated to Switzerland in 1717 via Lyon. In 1720, he partnered with Jean-Jacques Deluze (whose sister, Esther, Jérémie married), to establish a factory for cotton prints, thus founding the Pourtalès house. They utilized fabric printing techniques brought back from the Dutch East Indies. The Pourtalès and Cie bank soon opened its doors. The Pourtalès family forged ties with the kings of Prussia, suzerains of the city of Neuchâtel. He was naturalized as a Neuchâtel citizen in 1724, admitted as a Burgher of Neuchâtel in 1729, and ennobled in 1750 by Frederick the Great, King of Prussia.

At the end of the 18th century, a French agent in Neuchâtel reported the following:

The Portalez house, the foremost in Switzerland and one of the leading in Europe, has branches as far as the Indies, Africa, and America. Its European branches are in Paris, Lyon, Port-Orient, Trieste, and elsewhere. This is why Mr. Portalez is a citizen of all nations. If the English seize one of his ships, Mr. Portalez is an English citizen. If French privateers seize one in turn? Mr. Portalez is a citizen of Paris, Lyon, Port-Orient, etc. This cosmopolitan also frequently plays the role of a Prussian, and this role saved him, two years ago in London, a cargo of Indian fabrics he was bringing to French ports, worth over 190,000… The finest establishments in the city and county of Neuchâtel belong to Mr. Portalez… It is not the King of Prussia who is the sovereign of the county of Neuchâtel; the king merely holds the title, while Mr. Portalez holds the reality and the power.

On 14 January 1808, Jacques-Louis de Pourtalès, son of Jérémie, founded the Pourtalès Hospital in Neuchâtel.

In the 19th century, people spoke of the “Pourtalès kingdom” due to the family’s wealth and influence.

Introduced to Emperor Napoleon III by the Austrian ambassador in Paris, Richard de Metternich, Mélanie de Pourtalès, née Renouard de Bussierre, became a familiar figure at the Court. She was the sole owner of the Château de Pourtalès in Strasbourg-Robertsau, where prominent names from across Europe gathered: King Ludwig II of Bavaria, Emperor Wilhelm II, the King and Queen of Belgium, the Prince of Wales, Prince Napoleon, Franz Liszt, Albert Schweitzer, and Léon Bakst.

In 1900, at the Summer Olympics, Hermann de Pourtalès, his American wife Hélène, and his nephew Bernard won one of the thirteen events on their yacht Lérina and placed second in another.

In 1914, Friedrich von Pourtalès (1853–1928) was the German ambassador in Saint Petersburg and delivered to the minister of Tsar, Sergey Sazonov, the ultimatum of Wilhelm II, which led to the war. At the same time, his relative Guy enlisted in the French army, where he served as an interpreter throughout the war.

In 1937, Guy de Pourtalès, son of Hermann, received the Grand Prix du Roman de l'Académie française for La Pêche miraculeuse.

In 1940, Raymond de Pourtalès, son of the writer, died on the battlefield at Bois-Grenier.

Hélie de Pourtalès (born in 1938), son of Count James de Pourtalès (1911–1996) and Violette de Talleyrand-Périgord (1915–2003), was authorized by decree on 13 October 2005 to add the name Talleyrand-Périgord to his patronymic, becoming “de Pourtalès de Talleyrand-Périgord”.

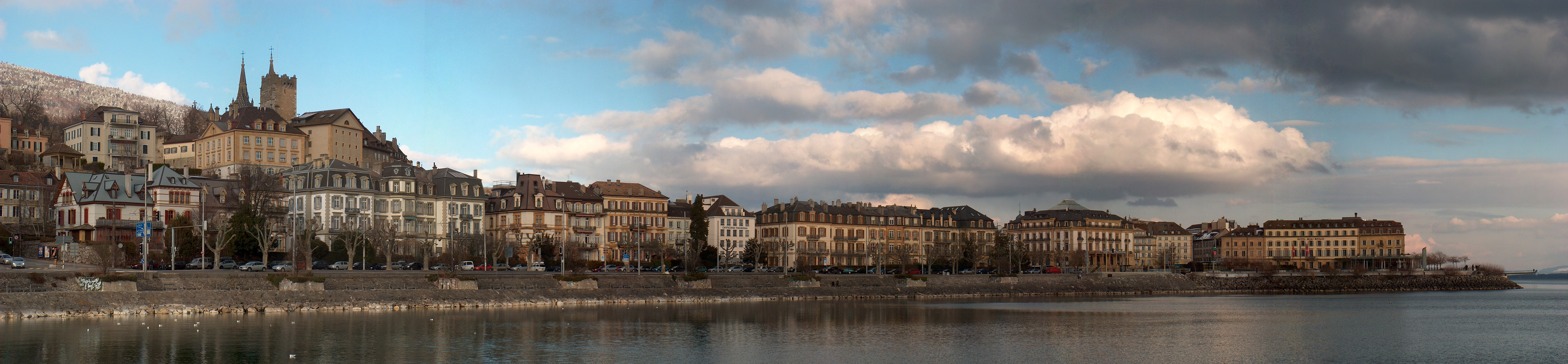
View of Neuchâtel (Switzerland).

== Castles and residences ==
In 1794, the family acquired the Carthusian monastery of La Lance from the Chevalier de Rochefort.

In 1806, Count James Alexandre (1776–1855) acquired the Château de Bandeville.

In 1809, James-Alexandre purchased the Château de Luins for 150,000.

In 1813, the same acquired the lordship of Gorgier, in the Canton of Neuchâtel.

In 1819, the family became the owner of Serraux-Dessus, now part of Begnins, in the Canton of Vaud.

In 1856, Alexandre Joseph de Pourtalès (1811–1883), two years after acquiring the land, began the construction of the Crénées estate in Mies.

In 1857, Count Henri de Pourtalès (1815–1876) purchased Île du Levant.

In 1887, Mélanie Renouard de Bussierre, wife of de Pourtalès, already mentioned, inherited the castle now known as Château de Pourtalès.

After World War II, Marguerite, daughter of Baron Arthur de Schickler and wife of Hubert de Pourtalès (1863–1949), began the restoration of the Château de Martinvast, in the Manche, a project continued by her grandson, Christian Hubert de Pourtalès.

In 2003, upon the death of Violette de Talleyrand-Périgord, the Château du Marais passed down to the children of her first husband, James de Pourtalès (1911–1996).

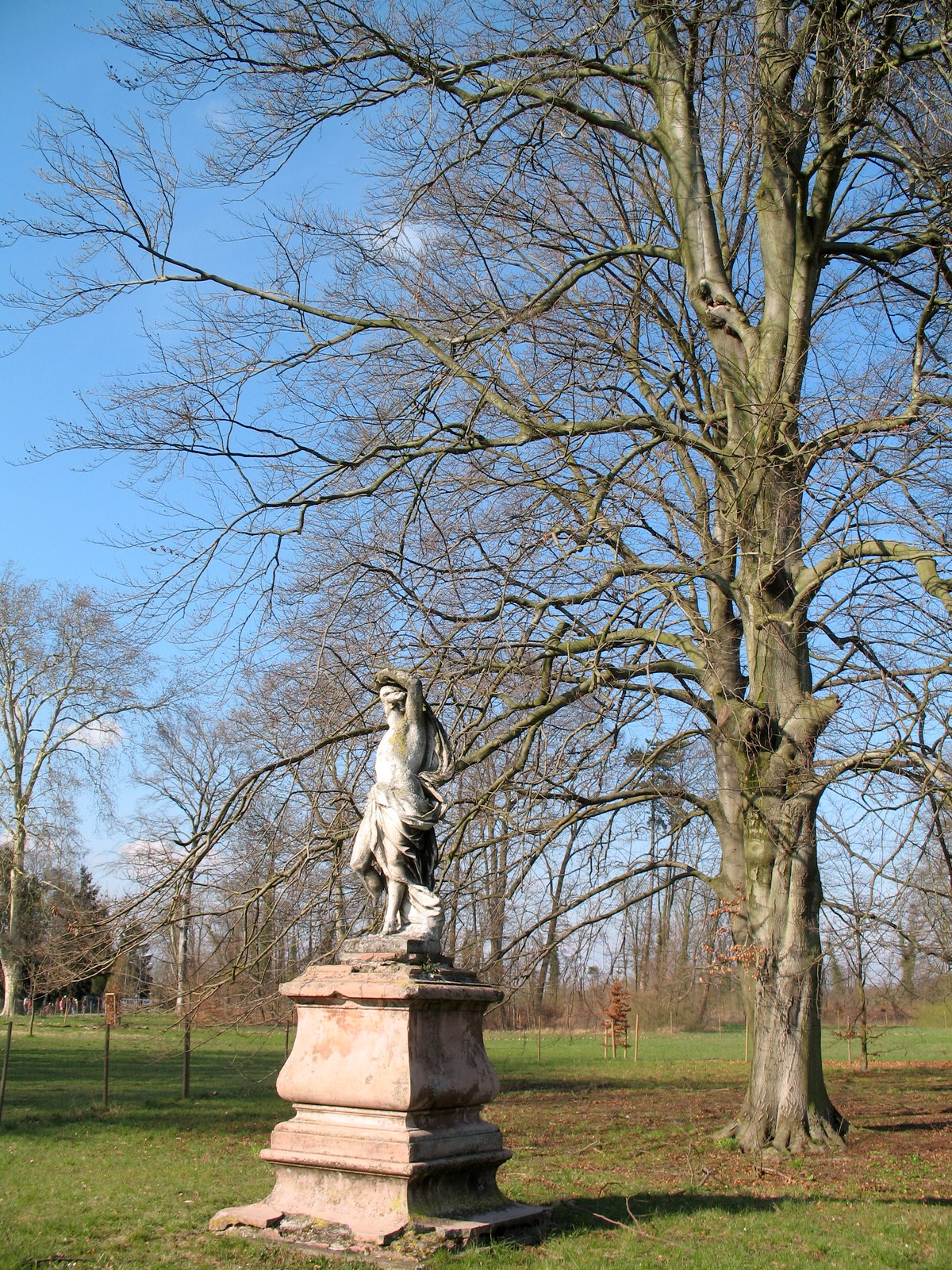
Parc de Pourtalès in which the Château de Pourtalès is located (Strasbourg)

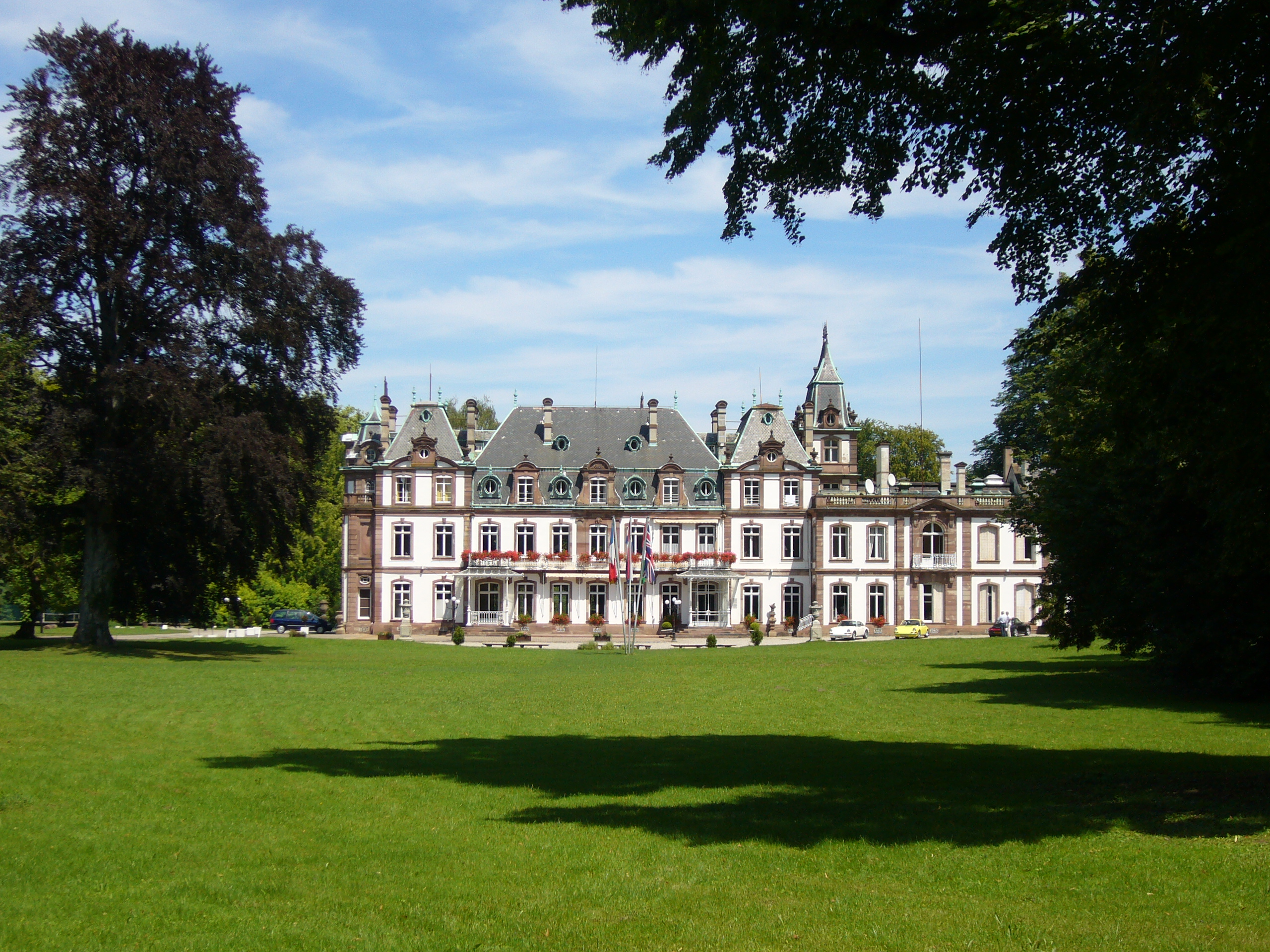
Château de Pourtalès (Strasbourg)

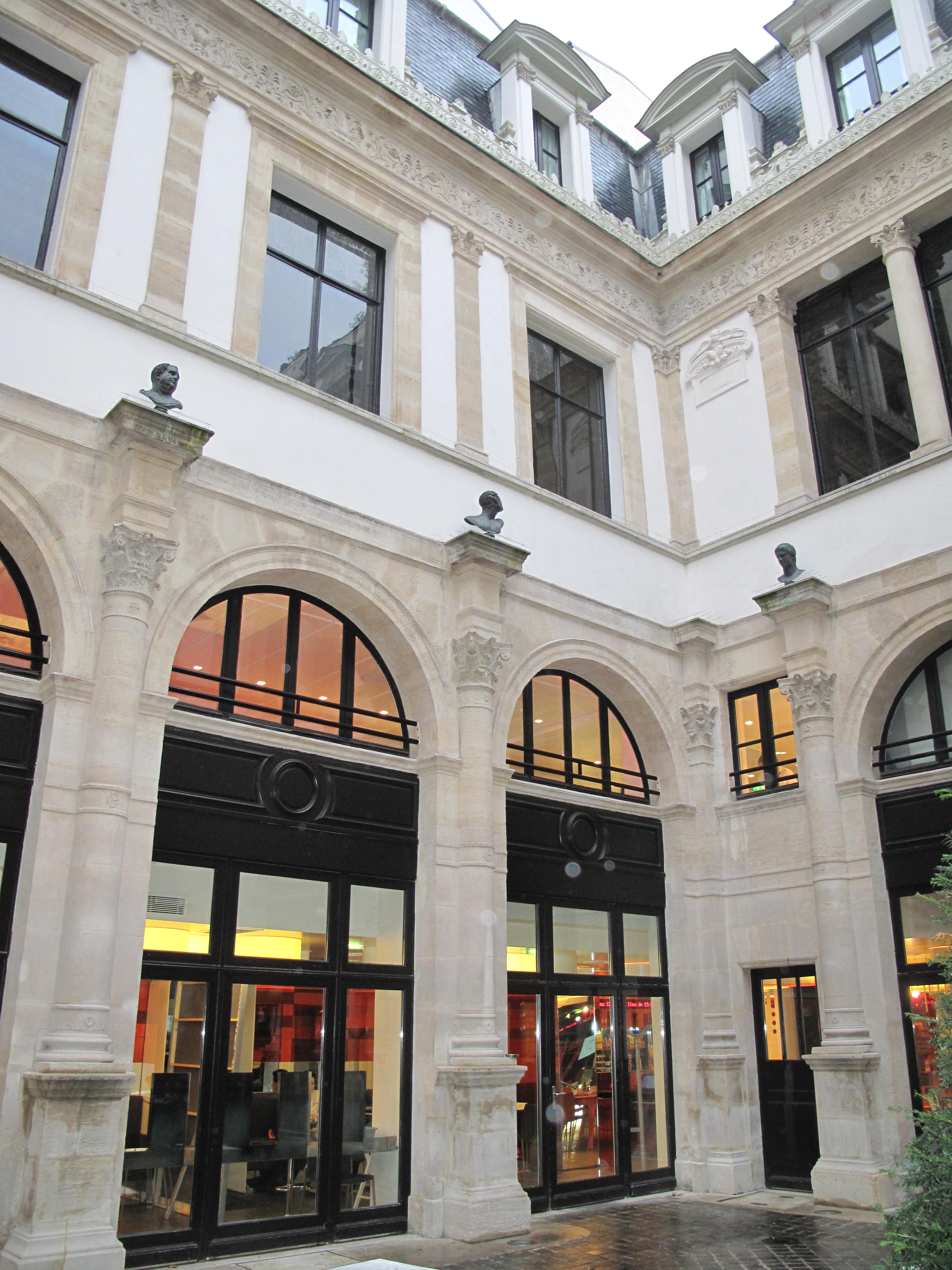
Hôtel de Pourtalès (Paris)

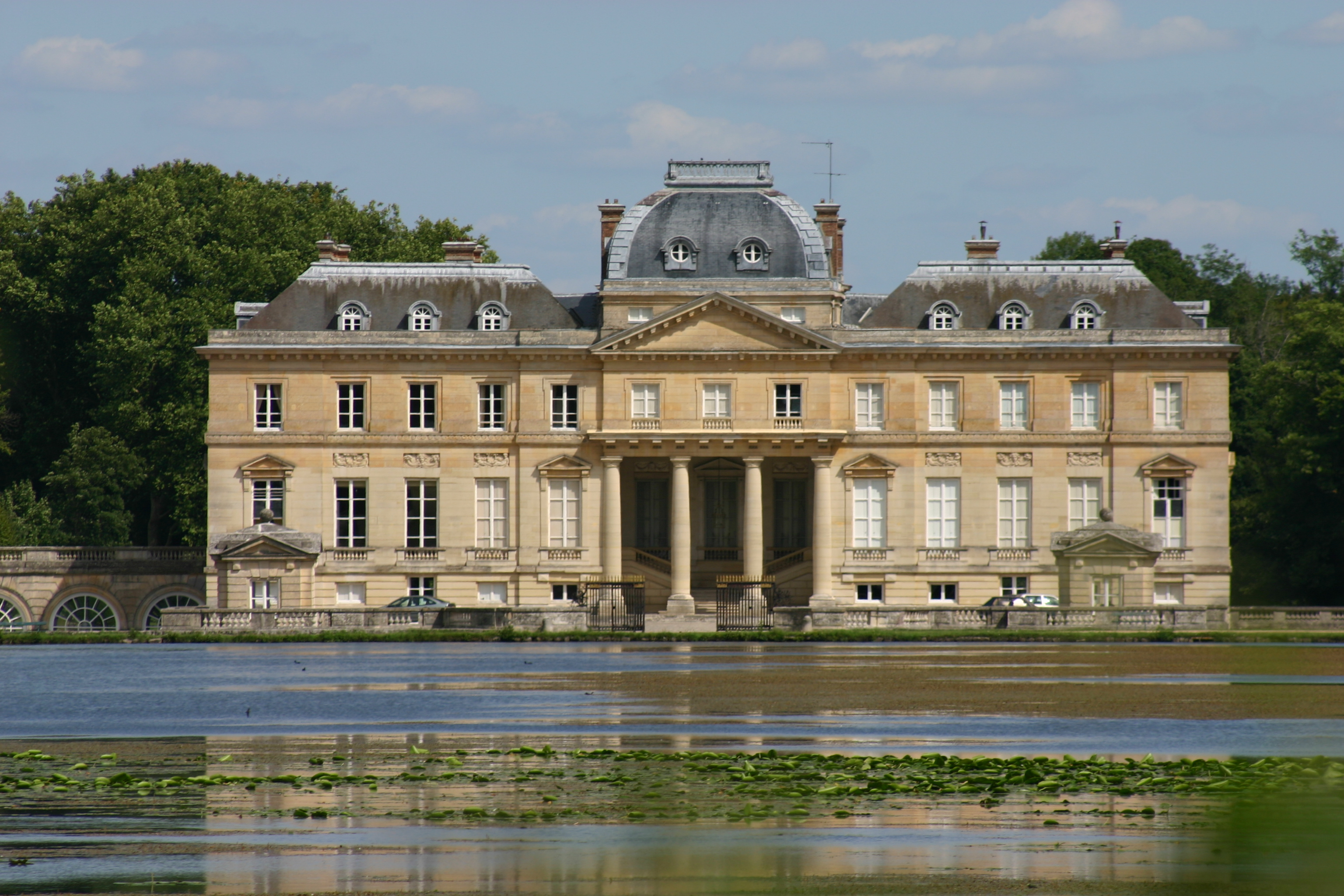
Château du Marais (Essonne)

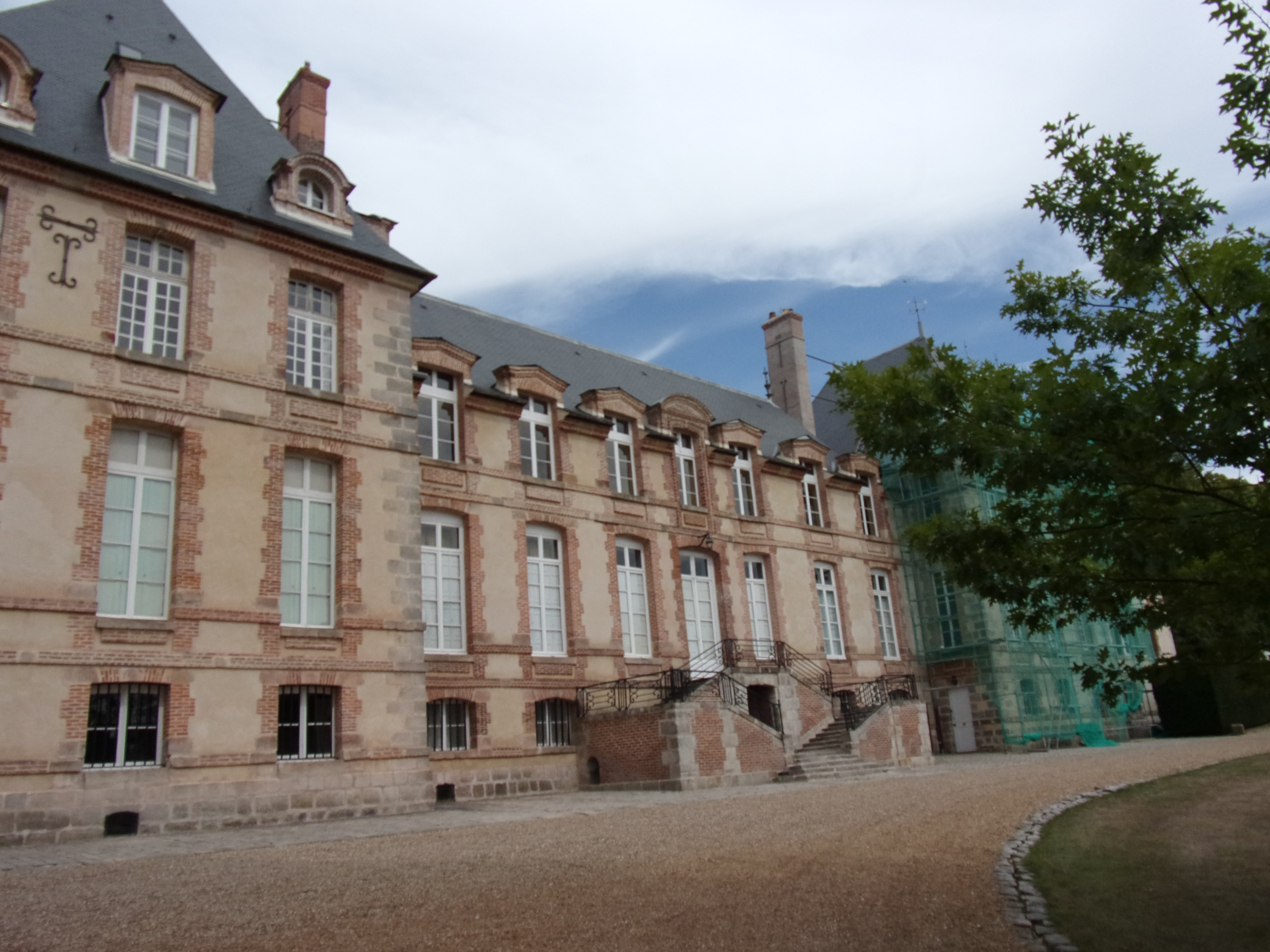
Château de Bandeville (Essonne)

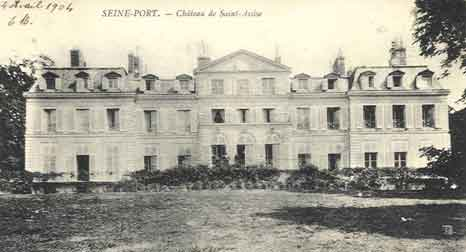
Château de Sainte-Assise (Seine-et-Marne)

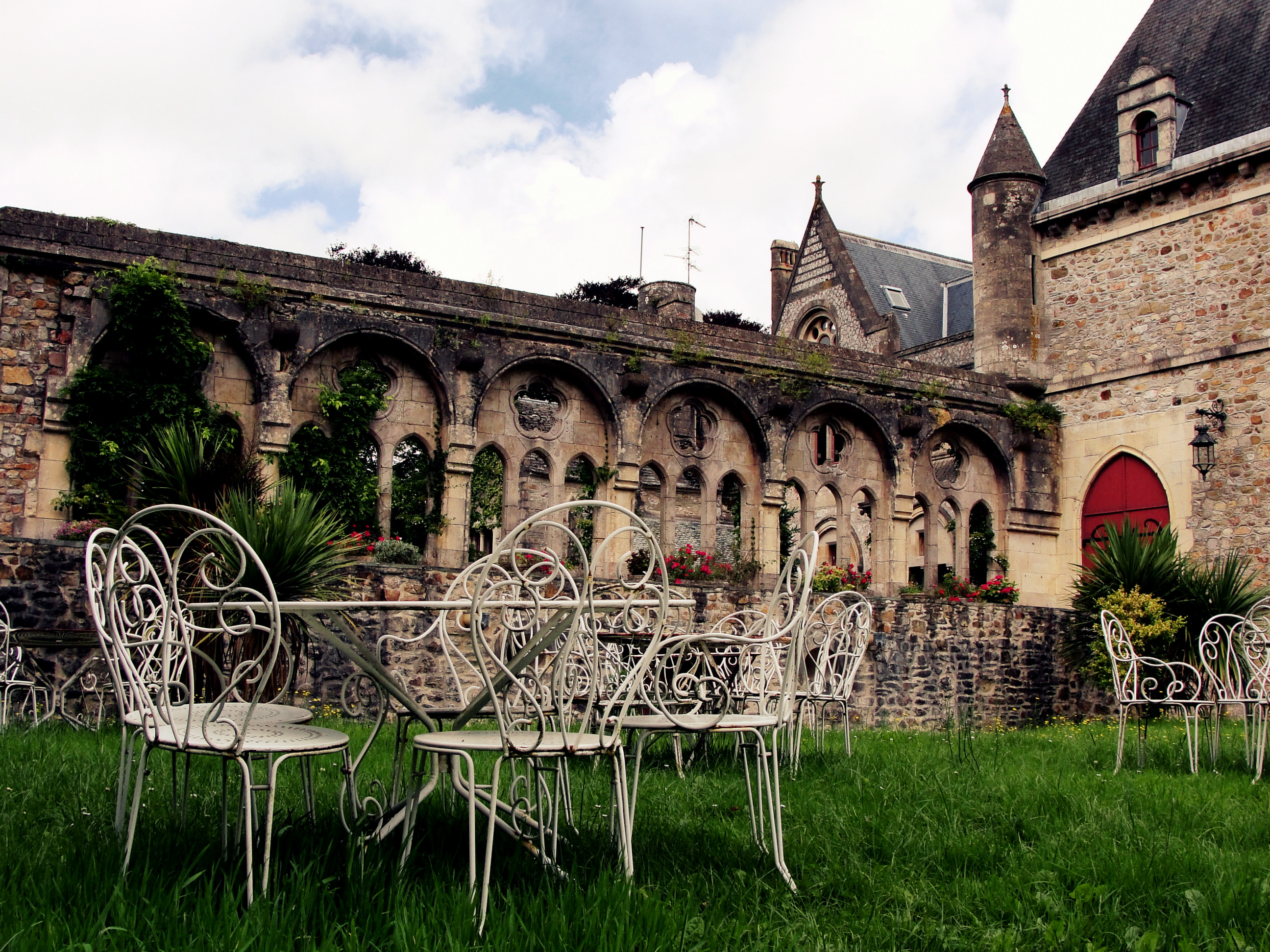
Château de Martinvast (Manche)

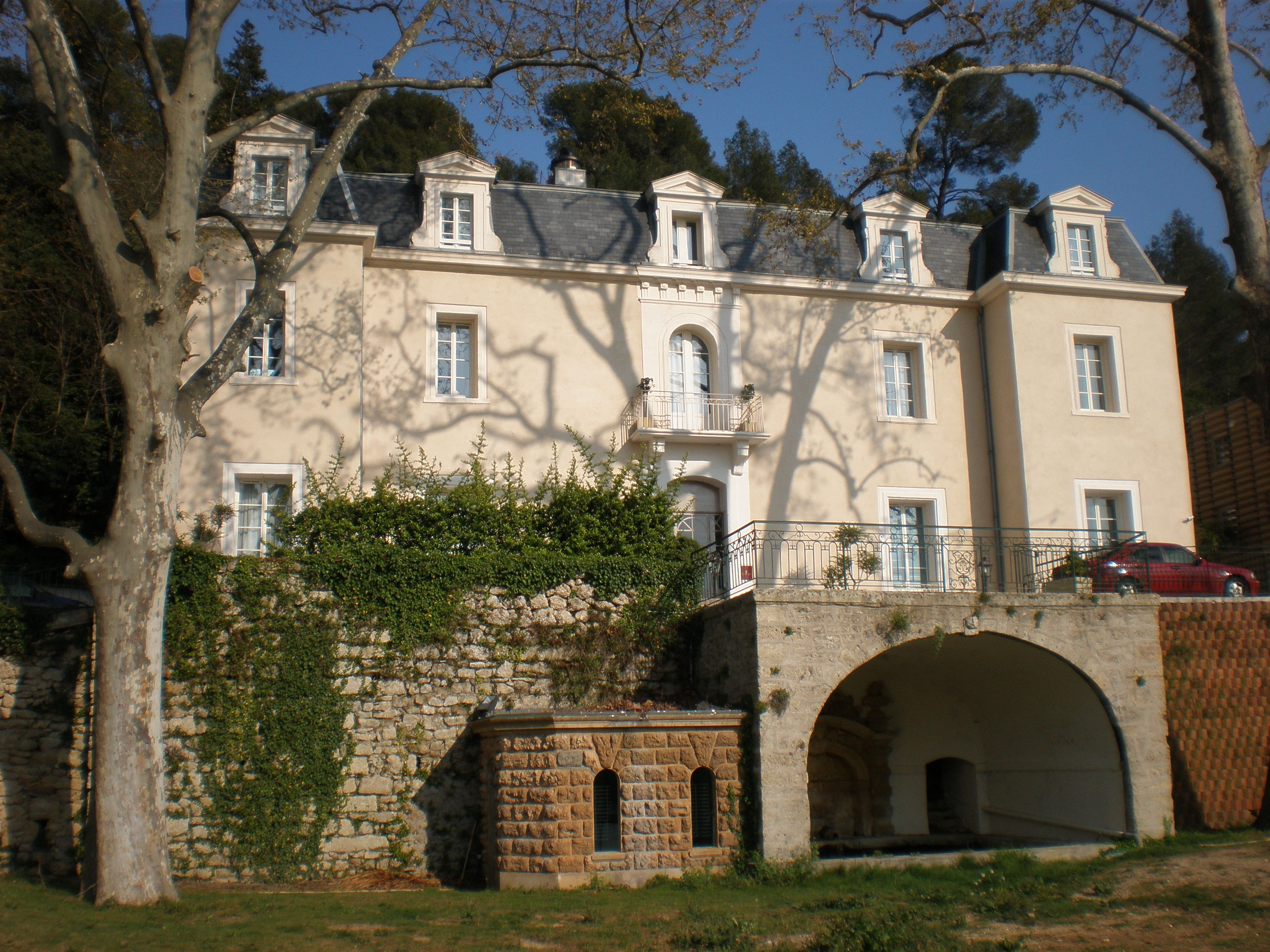
Château de Bionne (Hérault)

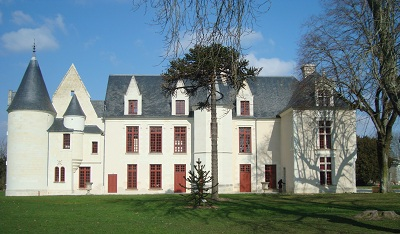
Château de Cangé (Indre-et-Loire)

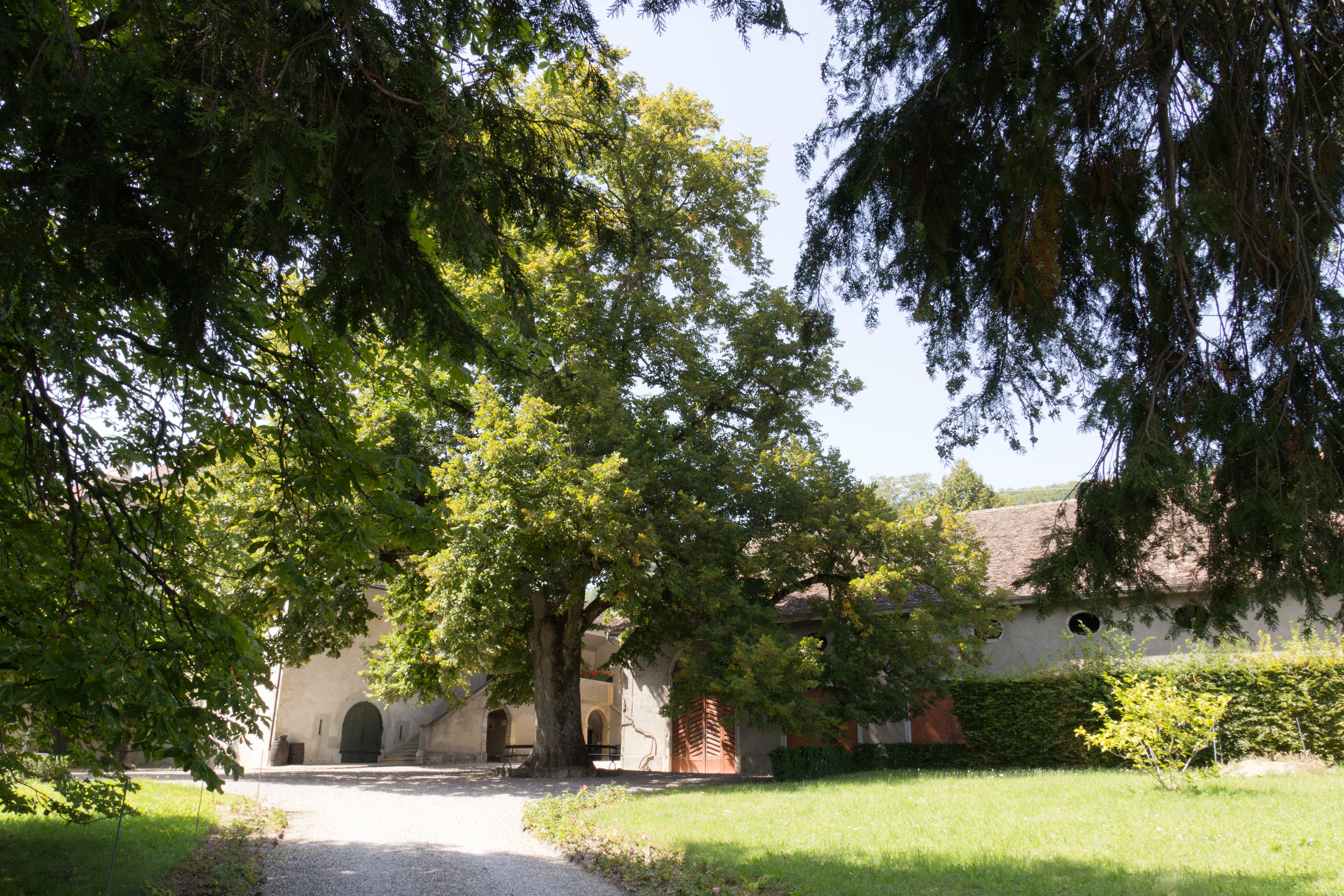
Château de Luins (Switzerland)

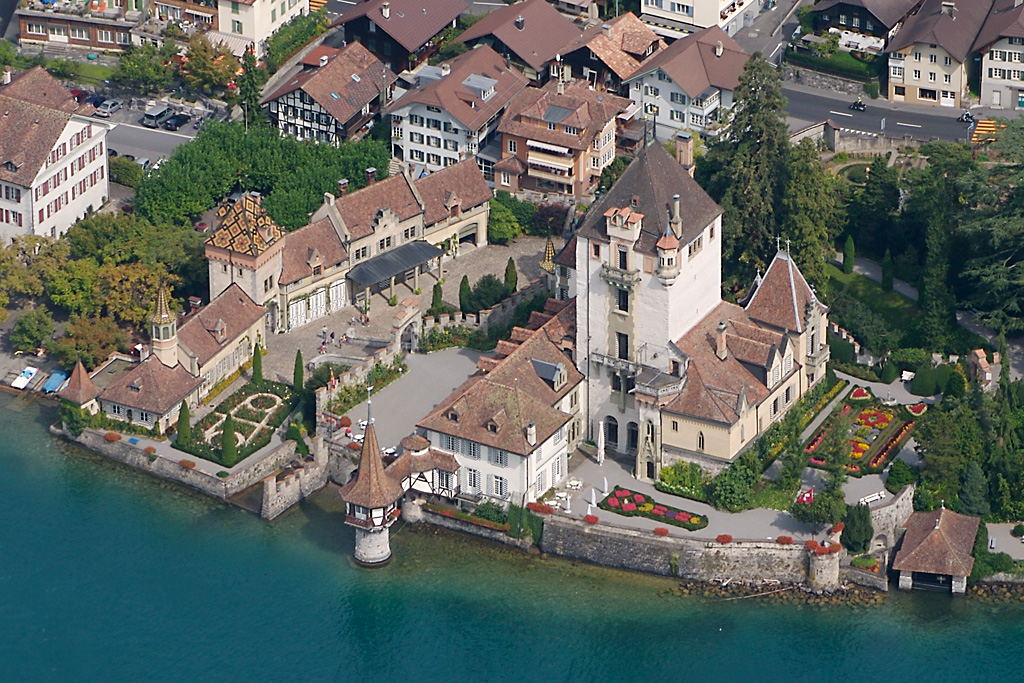
Château d'Oberhofen (Switzerland)

== Notable people ==
- Jérémie Pourtalès, later de Pourtalès (1700-1784), lived in Neuchâtel, Switzerland, where he was a merchant and industrialist. He was ennobled by King Frederick II of Prussia in 1750.
- Jacques-Louis de Pourtalès (1722-1814), banker, merchant, and industrialist.
- Louis de Pourtalès (1773-1848), State Councilor for the canton of Neuchâtel from 1803 to 1836 and deputy to the General Audiences in 1815, signatory of the Federal Pact for the canton of Neuchâtel in 1815 and delegate to the Federal Diet (1816, 1817, 1821, 1831), Colonel-Inspector General of Artillery of the Swiss Confederation in 1826, member of several military commissions and the Federal War Council (1831), President of the Council of State of the canton of Neuchâtel in 1831
- James-Alexandre de Pourtalès (1776 in Neuchâtel - 1855 in Paris), Swiss banker, diplomat, and art collector, chamberlain to Frederick William III of Prussia
- Frédéric de Pourtalès (1779-1861), federal colonel in 1831 (Switzerland), grand master of ceremonies at the Prussian court from 1842 to 1848, state councilor in Neuchâtel (Switzerland)
- Albert von Pourtalès (1812-1861), Minister Plenipotentiary of Prussia in Paris, member of the Prussian House of Lords
- Louis François de Pourtalès (1823-1880), American naturalist, of Swiss origin
- Edmond de Pourtalès-Gorgier (1828-1895), banker, general councilor, during the siege of Strasbourg he was commander of the 4th battalion of the Bas-Rhin Mobile National Guard
- Mélanie Renouard de Bussierre (1836-1914), wife of Edmond de Pourtalès, familiar with the court of the Second Empire, salonnière
- Hermann de Pourtalès (1847-1904), squadron leader in the Cuirassier Regiment of the Guard (Prussia), sailor
- Friedrich von Pourtalès (1853-1928), German ambassador to Saint Petersburg
- Hélène de Pourtalès (1868-1945), sailor
- Bernard de Pourtalès (1870-1935), sailor
- Guy de Pourtalès (1881-1941), writer, winner of the Grand Prix du Roman de l'Académie Française

== Portraits ==
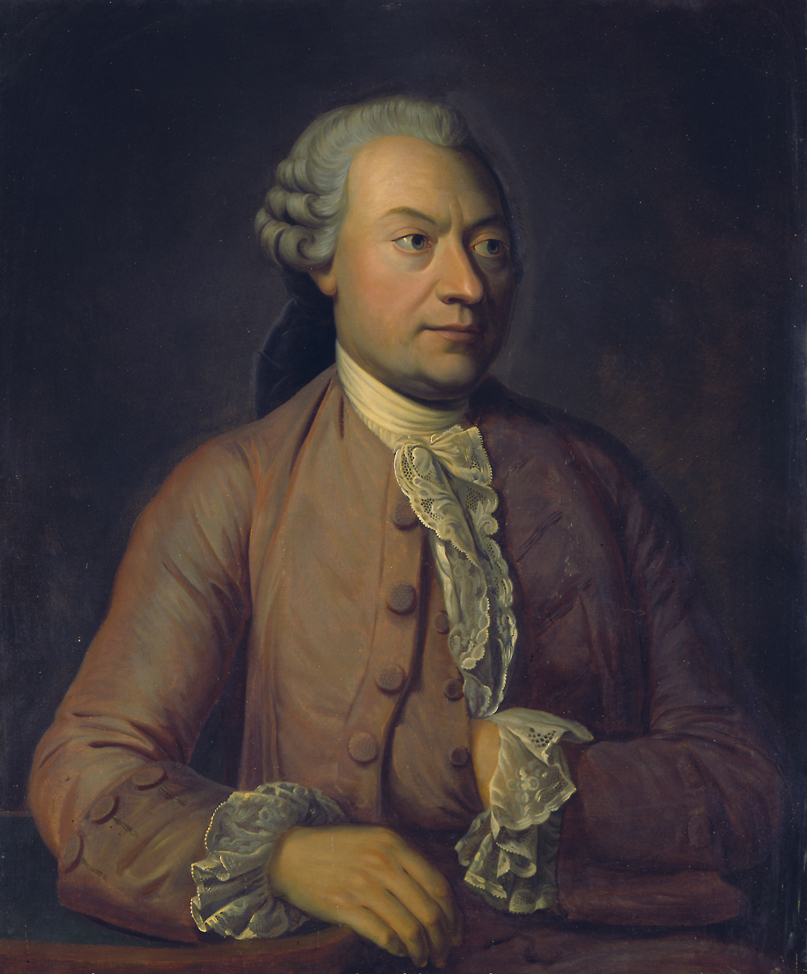
Jacques-Louis de Pourtalès (1722-1814)

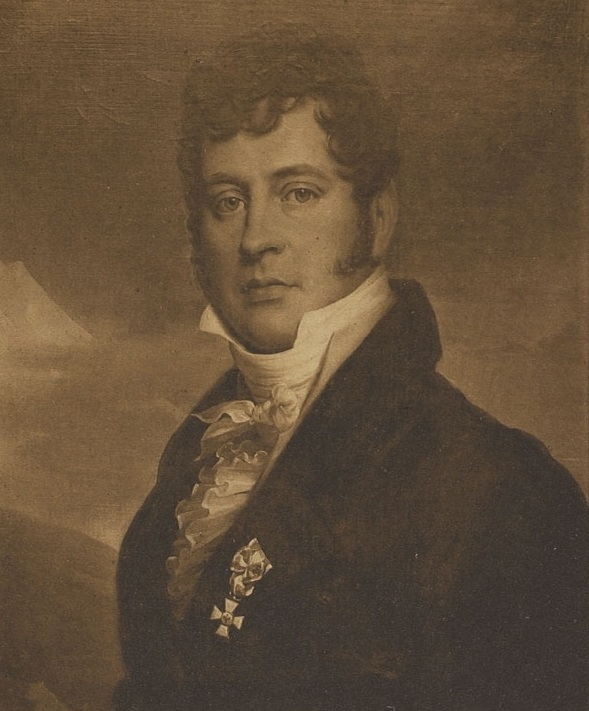
Ludwig de Pourtales (1773-1848)

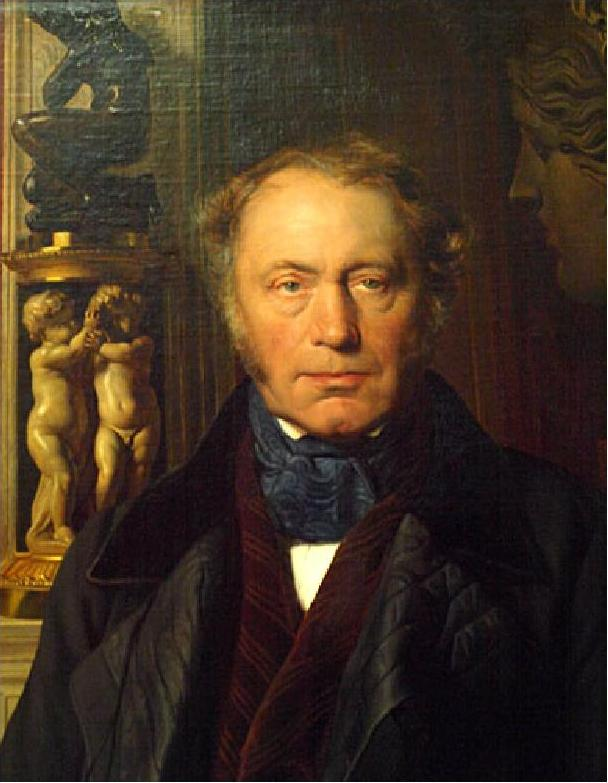
James Alexandre de Pourtalès-Gorgier (1776-1855)

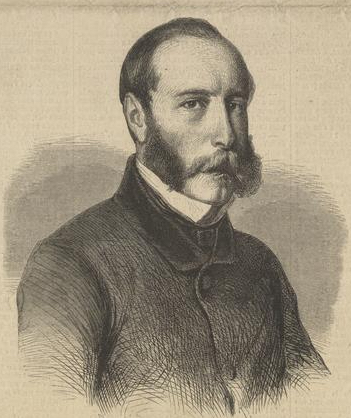
Albert de Pourtalès (1812-1861)

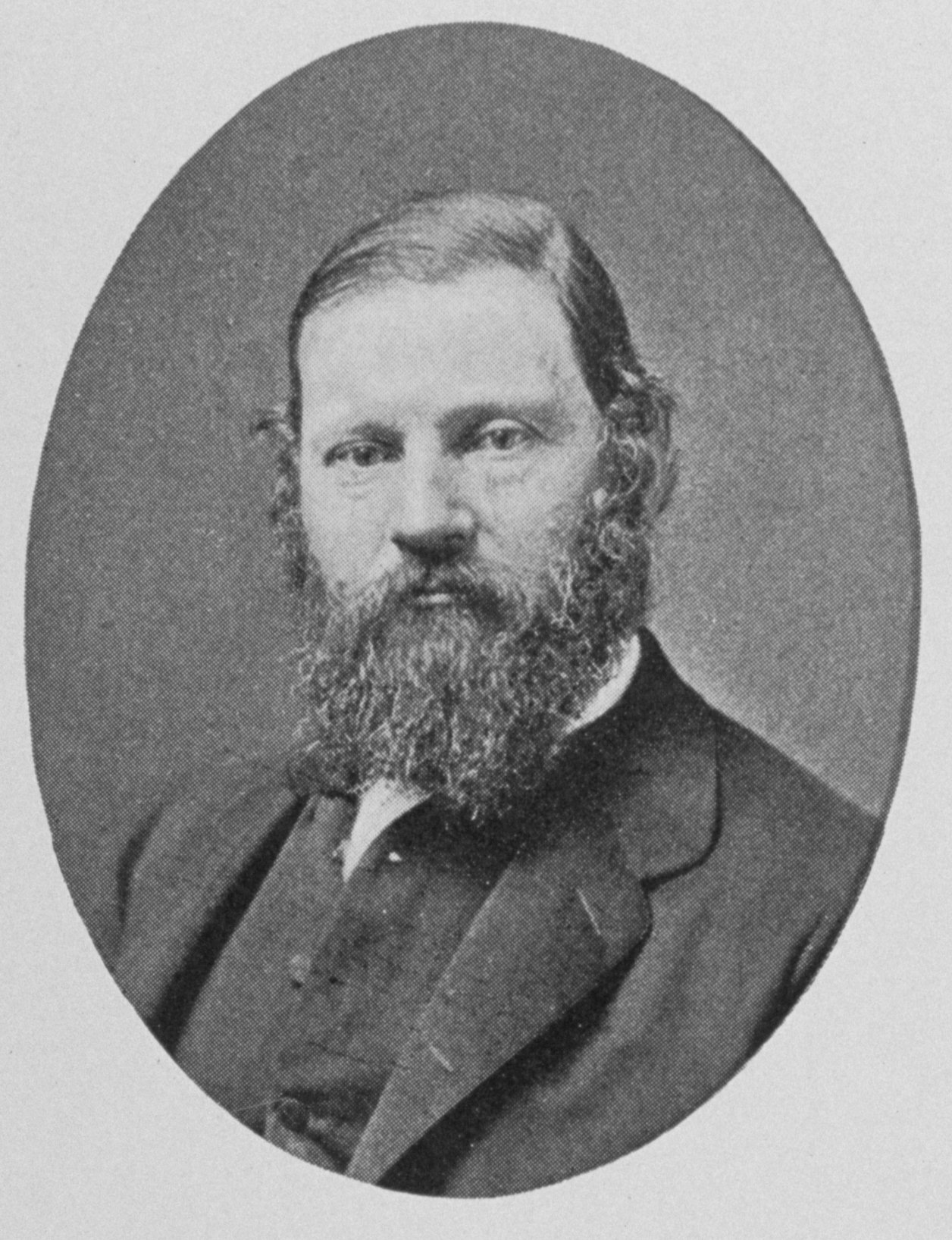
Louis Francois de Pourtales (1823-1880)

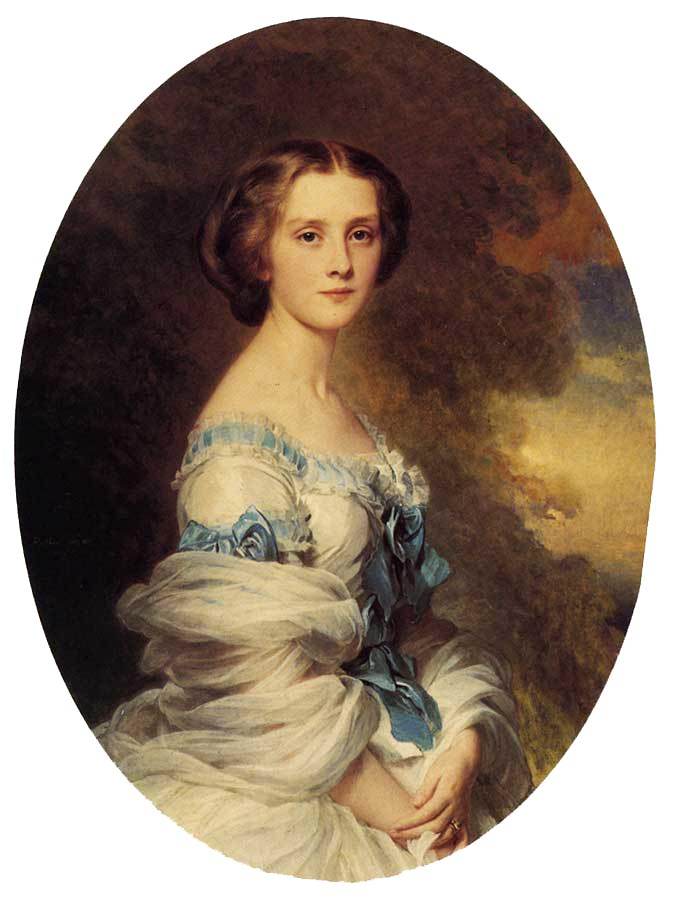
Mélanie Renouard de Bussierre (1836-1914), épouse d'Edmond de Pourtalès

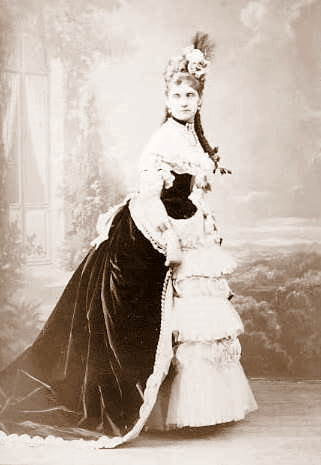
Hélène de Pourtalès (1868-1945), née Barbey

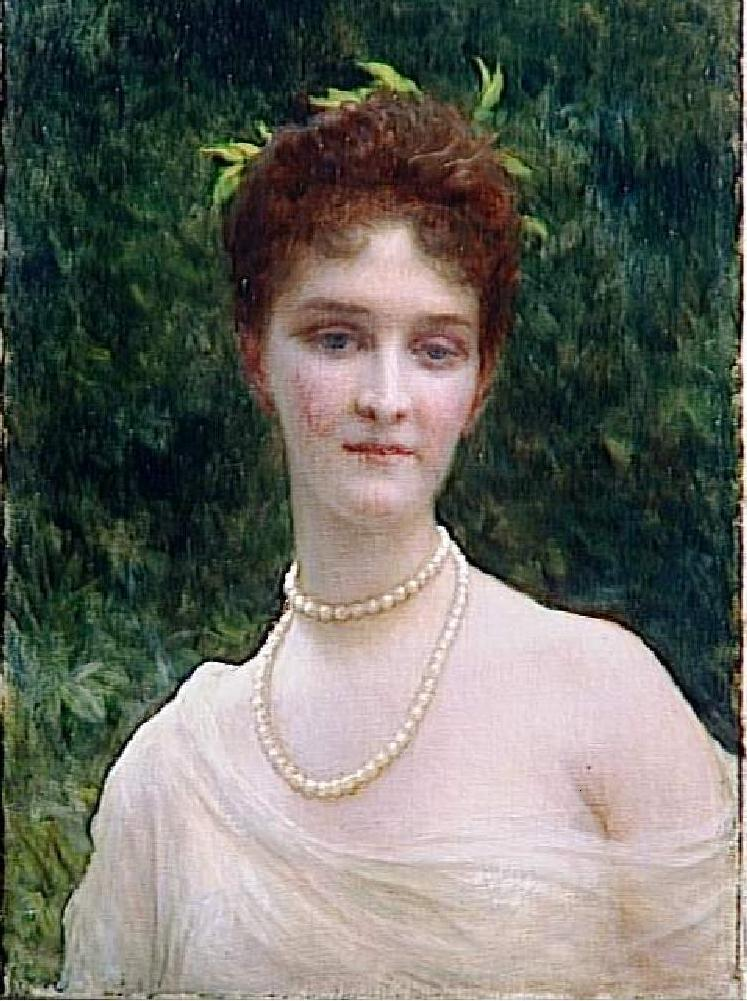
Agnès de Pourtalès (1870-1930), wife of Loys-Chandieu

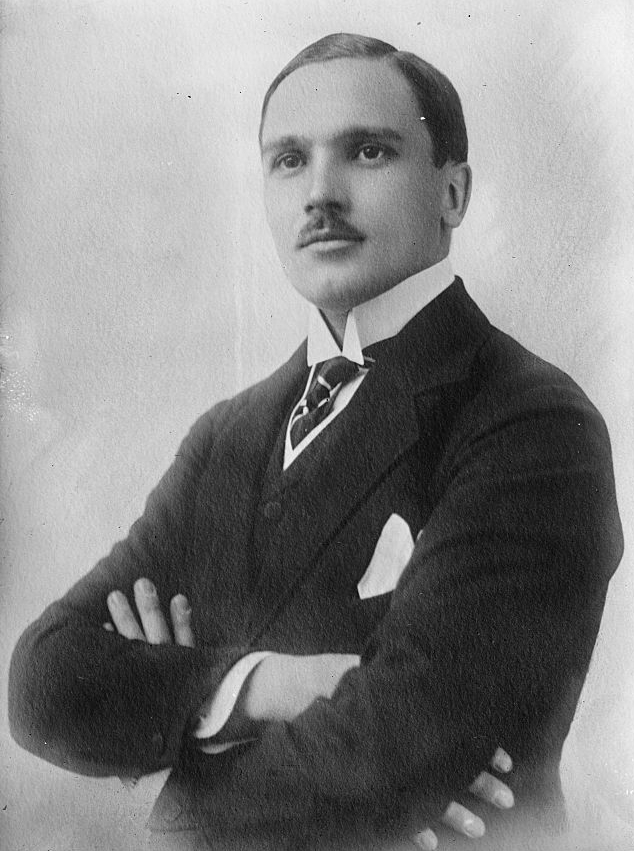
Raymond de Pourtalès (1883-1914)

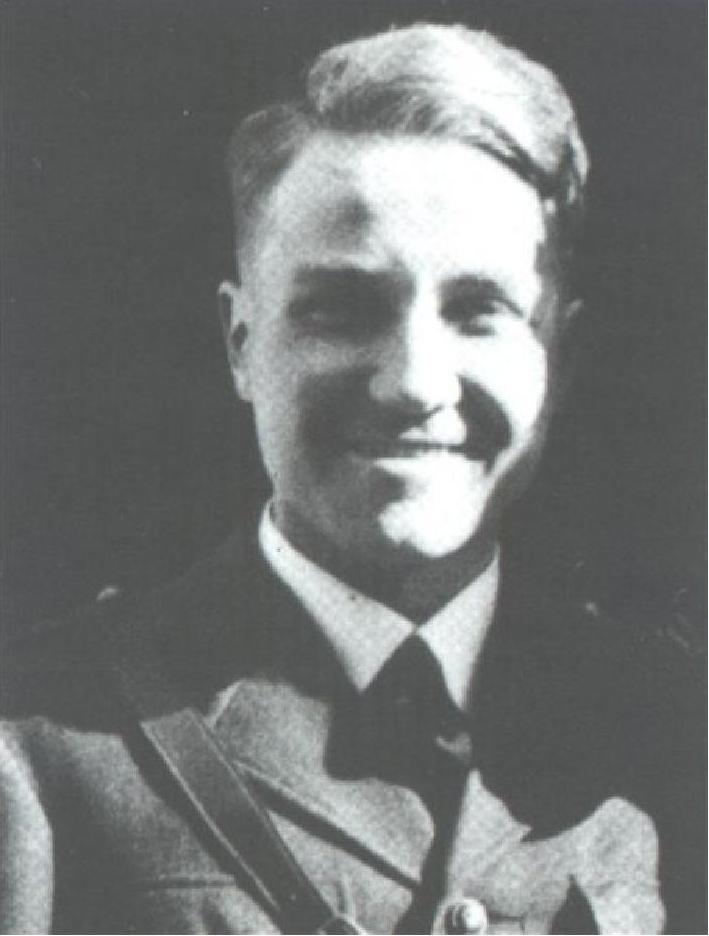
Raymond de Pourtalès (1914-1940)

== Genealogy ==
=== Cévennes roots ===
Cévennes roots
- Pierre m. (1445) Antonie Gauthier
  - 1> Jean m. (1471) Guillerme de Novis
    - 1> Louis
      - m. (1) (1490) Sébastienne Hermet
      - m. (2) (1515) Antonie Colognac
        - (1) Pierre (1510-1571) m. noble Claude de Brosson
          - Antoine (1540 - )
            - m. (1)(1560) Isabeau Gervais
            - m. (2)(1572) Catherine de Falguerolles
            - m. (3)(1609) Élisabeth Solier
              - 1> (2) Paul (1573-1624), cooper m. (1595) Marguerite Gaujoux
                - Anne (1600 - )
                - Jean (1604 - )
              - 2> (2) Jacques, fustier m. (1595) Isabeau Salles
                - 1> Paul (1620-1698), wool merchant m. (1642) Marie Fabrègues
                  - 1> Suzanne (1644 - ) m. François Durant
                  - 2> Jeanne (1646 - ) m. (1674) Jean Novis
                  - 3> Jean (1669-1739), merchant, trader, banker
                    - m. (1) (1670) Jeanne Viala
                    - m. (2) (1681) Suzanne de Molles
                      - 1> (2) Suzanne (1682 - ) m. (1702) Jean Viala
                      - 2> (2) Jeanne (1686 - ) m. Pierre Puech
                      - 3> (2) Jean (1689-1739) m. Laure Moynier
                        - 1> Suzanne (1728 - ) m. (1760) Fulcrand Claparède
                        - 2> Louis (1733-1763)
                        - 3> Jean, capitain m. Suzanne Caumel
                          - Henriette m. Annibal de Darvieu
                      - 4> (2) Louis (1692-1751), cloth merchant m. (1714) Catherine Mazette
                        - 1> Anne (1715-1807) m. (1733) Jean François d'Escherny
                        - 2> Marguerite
                          - m. (1) (1739) Simon Greffuhle
                          - m. (2) (1764) François Louis du Trembley
                        - 3> Jean Jacques (1724-1764) m. (1755) Marguerite Kick
                      - 5> (2) François (1694 - ) m. Élisabeth Féminier
                      - 6> (2) Pierre (1698 - ), merchant m. Marguerite de Saillens
                      - 7> (2) Jérémie (1700-1784), cloth merchant, emigrated to Switzerland, see below
                      - 8> (2) Étienne (1703-1739), partner at the Martinesque firm in Hamburg m. (1723) Marie Philippine Martinesque
                        - > Henriette
                      - 9> (2) Paul (1706-1740), partner at Dumoustier de Vastre, in Saint-Quentin m. Catherine Dumoustier de Vastre
                        - 1> Théophile ( - 1819)
                        - 2> André Paul (1741-1825), mayor of Valenciennes
                          - m. (1) Marie de Noiseux
                          - m. (2) Marie Serret
                            - 1> (1) Rosalie Jeanne (1769-1809) m. Jacques Rousseau de Launois
                            - 2> (1) Georges André (1775-1825)
                              - m. (1) N. de Maguito
                              - m. (2) Anne Rigano
                                - 1> (1) Louise m. N. Bogaerts
                                - 2> (1) Louis (v. 1801 - )
                                - 3> (1) Amélie
                                - 4> (1) Gustave
                            - 3> (1) Fébronie Victorine (1776-1859) m. Hermenegilde Castellain
                            - 4> (1) Victoire m. N. Bourgeois
                  - 4> Jaquette (1655 - ) m. Pierre Bastide
                  - 5> Isaac (1660 - )
                - 2> Antoine m. Louise Camplan
              - 3> (2) Pierre m. Marie Combes
              - 4> (2) Jehan m. Isabeau Reynier
              - 5> (2) Raymond cardeur
              - 6> (2) Claude m. Raymond de Lafoux
              - 7> (2) Antoinette m. (1553) Antoine Valmale
              - 8> (2) Catherine m. Jean Michel
    - 2> Antoine m. (1517) Antonie Teulon
      - Claude m. (1555) Catherine Jehan
        - Balthazar
    - 3> Jehan (1507 - )
      - Balthazar
        - Antoinette
    - 4> Jeanne m. Guillaume Euzière
    - 5> Catherine m. Guillaume Paulet
  - 2> Antonie m. Jacques Cavalier

=== Branch of Jérémie de Pourtalès ===
Branch of Jérémie de Pourtalès
- Jérémie (1700-1784), cloth merchant, see above m. (1721) Esther Marguerite de Luze
  - 1> Jacques Louis le Grand (1722-1814), merchant and philanthropist m. (1769) Marie Augustine de Luze
    - 1> Louis (1773-1848), State Councilor of Neuchâtel m. (1795) Sophie de Guy d'Audanger
      - 1> Louis Auguste (1796-1870), lieutenant-colonel m. (1822) Élisabeth de Sandoz-Rollin
        - 1> Louis François (1823-1880), curator of the Museum of Comparative Zoology d’Harvard m. Marianne Bachman
        - 2> Jacques Alfred (1824-1889), Lord of Laasow (district of Calau and Ehrensdorf)
          - m. (1) (1850) Anna von Paschwitz
          - m. (2) (1856) Sophie von Thielau
            - 1> (2) Alphonse (1861 - )
            - 2> (2) Frédéric Guillaume Louis (1865 - )
            - 3> (2) Frédéric Charles Nicolas (1868 - ), Captain in the 5th Regiment of the Prussian Guard
        - 3> Sophie Élisabeth (1826-1870) m. (1843) Karl Franz von Erlach, and posterity
        - 4> Charles Eugène (1828-1867), lieutenant in the Prussian Guard Rifles
          - > Armand Frédéric (1865-1903), jurist m. Marguerite Madeleine Sophie von Tscharner
        - 5> Jean (1829-1907), major in the Prussian Guard Rifle Battalion
        - 7> Pierre-Maurice (1837-1908), lieutenant (?) in the Royal Prussian Army, president of the Pourtalès Hospital m. Anna von Schönberg (1834-1871)
          - 1> Albert (1870-1952), physician, president of Pourtalès Hospital m. Geneviève de Blonay
            - 1> Marguerite (1898 - 1962)
            - 2> Marie Élisabeth (1900 - 1990)
            - 3> Guillaume (1902 - 1996
            - 4> Ernest (1906 - 1990)
            - 5> Louis-Albert (1910 - 1974), president of Pourtalès Hospital
      - 2> Alphonse (1801 - )
      - 3> Cécile (1804-1830) m. (1825) Alexandre Charles Perrégaux (1791- 1837)
      - 4> Alexandre Joseph (1811-1883), head of the Neuchâtel artillery corps, major in Prussia m. (1835) Augusta Saladin de Crans
        - 1> Blanche (1836-1923) m. Gabriel Naville, and posterity
        - 2> Hermann (1847-1904)
          - m. (1) Marguerite Marcet
          - m. (2) Helen Barbey
            - 1> Constance m. Jules Frossard de Saugy, and posterity
            - 2> Raymond Lucien Edmond (1882-1914) m. Louise de Bernstorff
              - > Manfred Horace Gunther
            - 3> (1) Augusta (1886 - ) m. Otto von Mitzlaff
            - 4> Horace Casimir (1888-1970)
            - 5> Franck
            - 6> (1) Guy, (1881-1941) writer m. Hélène Marcuard
              - 1> Françoise (1912-2008)
              - 2> Raymond (1914-1940), killed in action m. Yvonne Delm
              - 3> Rose (1919-1995)
            - 7> Irène m. Dominique de Dietrich, and posterity
            - 8> Jacqueline m. Richard Pictet, and posterity
            - 9> Alix m. Buchart von Saldern
        - 3> Louis
        - 4> Isabelle m. Édouard Naville
        - 5> Albert
        - 6> Auguste m. Marguerite Renouard de Bussière
        - 7> Augusta m. Louis Petitpierre
        - 8> Albert m. Mina de Constant de Rebecque
        - 9> Louise (1837-1906) m. Henri de Saussure → Ferdinand et René
        - 10> Cécile m. Hermann Petitpierre
    - 2> James Alexandre de Pourtalès-Gorgier (1776-1855), chamberlain to the King of Prussia m. (1809) Anne Henriette Falconnet de Palézieux
      - 1> Élisa Calixte (1810-1877) m. (1831) Charles-Alexandre de Ganay (1803-1881)
      - 2> Cécile (1812-1833) m. (1830) Rodolphe Émile Adolphe de Rougemont
      - 3> Henri (1815-1876), Count of Pourtalès-Gorgier, captain in the Swiss Confederation's engineering corps m. (1840) Anne Marie d'Escherny
        - 1> Émilie (1842-1909) m. (1863) Étienne Cyprien Gaston Renouard de Bussière
        - 2> Arthur (1844 - ), Minister Plenipotentiary of France to Guatemala
      - 4> Charles (1816-1871) m. Agnes Luise Friederike von Putbus (1830-1909)
      - 5> Jacques "Robert" (1821-1874), deputy of Seine-et-Oise m. (1846) Adèle Anna Hagermann
        - 1> Jacques "Albert" (1847-1934) m. (1871) Caroline Julie Henriette Joly de Bammeville
          - 1> Arthur(1874-1942) m. Marie van Ryck van Rietwyk
            - 1> Gérard (1906-1934)
            - 2> James Robert (1911-1996) de Pourtalès
              - m. (1) Emma Sanchez de Larragoiti
              - m. (2) (1937) Violette de Talleyrand-Périgord (div. 1969)
                - 1> (2) Hélie Alfred Gérard (°1938) de Pourtalès de Talleyrand-Périgord (name changed in 2005)
                  - m. (1) (1962) Dalité Matossian (°1937)
                  - m. (2) (1975) Marie Eugénie de Witt (°1941)
                  - 1> (1) Charles-Hélie (°1963) m. Lilas Orliac (°1967)
                    - 1> Paul-Hélie (°1999)
                    - 2> Sophia-Marie (°2001)
                  - 2> (1) Jacques Louis (°1964)
                  - 3> (1) Alain Georges Henri Jérémie Nicholas (°1965) m. Régine Lepeutrec (°1965)
                - 2> (2) Anna (°1944) m. Guy Frotier de Bagneux, marquis of Pouzauges, and posterity
                - 3> (2) Charles Maurice (°1951) m. Ségolène de Mandat de Grancey
                  - 1> Éléonore
                  - 2> Anne
                  - 3> Victoire
          - 2> Berthe
          - 3> Marguerite
          - 4> Jacques
          - 5> Édouard
          - 6> Edmond Marc (1876-1881)
        - 2> Célestine "Cécile" (1850-1940) m. (1872) Alfred d'Amboix de Larbont
        - 3> Mathilde Jeanne (1854 - ) m. ([1874]) friherre Gustaf Adelswärd (1843-1895)
      - 6> Edmond de Pourtalès (1828-1895), banker m. (1857) Mélanie Renouard de Bussière
        - 1> Jacques Alfred Edmond (1858-1919) m. Marie Conquère de Monbrison
        - 2> Hubert Louis Edouard Edmond (1863-1949), cavalry officer, thoroughbred breeder m. (1890) Marguerite Malvine Henriette de Schickler, banker's daughter and heiress to the Château de Martinvast
          - 1> Max Arthur Hubert (1893-1935) m. (1925) Andrée de Luze (1902-1976)
            - > Christian Hubert de Pourtalès, banker (1928-2018)
              - m. (1) (1957) Caroline Hottinger (1937-2008), daughter of baron Rodolphe Hottinger
              - m. (2) (1993) Karin Ehrenfeuchter (1954-)
                - 1> (1) Laure (1958-)
                  - m. (1) Jean de Fels (1950-), and posterity
                  - m. (2) Alain de Rose
                - 2> (1) Max (1961-) winegrower m. Astrid Lemercier de Maisoncelles de Richemont
                  - 1> Clémence
                  - 2> Alice
                  - 3> Caroline
                - 3> (1) Paul (mars 1961-), banker m. Raphaelle Haizet
                  - 1> Violaine (1987-) m. Louis-Romain Riché, and posterity
                  - 2> Eugénie
                  - 3> Léopold
                - 4> (2) Frédéric (1995-)
          - 2> Jeanne (1897-1984) m. (1920) Guy de Cazenove
            - 1> Arthur de Cazenove
            - 2> Henri de Cazenove
            - 3> Béatrix de Cazenove
        - 3> Paul (1859-1933), cavalry captain m. Françoise Cottier
          - 1> Louise (1885-1979) m. Roger d'Amboix de Larbont (son of Célestine “Cécile” de Pourtalès (1850-1940) and Alfred d'Amboix de Larbont, see above), and posterity
          - 2> Simone (1888-1977) m. Jean de Witt, and posterity
          - 3> Jean (1891-1954) or Jean Hubert Luc m. (1920) Madeleine Hottinger (1900-1995), daughter of Baron Henri Hottinguer
            - 1> François (1921-), lord of La Verrerie, count m. Joan Wilmot Sitwell (1932-), and posterity
            - 2> Jacques Louis (1922-1944)
            - 3> Constance (1923-) m. Yves Oberkampf, and posterity
            - 4> Étienne (1925-) m. Béatrice de Champeaux de la Boulaye (1929-), and posterity
            - 5> Charles (1928-1992), banker, count m. Marie Fortescue (1929-), and posterity
          - 4> Edmond (1896-1971)
          - 5> Pierre
        - 4> Mélanie m. Christian de Berckheim, and posterity
        - 5> Agnès m. Henri de Loys Chandieu, and posterity
    - 3> Jules Henri Charles Frédéric (1779-1861), master of ceremonies to the King of Prussia m. Marie Louise Elisabeth de Castellane-Norante
      - 1> Albert Alexandre (1813-1861), Prussian ambassador to Paris m. Anne Cécile Théodora de Bethmann-Hollweg (1827 - 1892)
      - 2> Guillaume (1815-1889), count of Pourtalès m. Charlotte Louise Augusta de Maltzan (1827 - )
        - 1> Frédéric (1853-1928), Prussian ambassador to Saint Petersburg from 1907 to 1914.
  - 2> Suzanne Marguerite (1723 - )
  - 3> Marianne (1724 - )
  - 4> Henri (1726-1796), pastor in Peseux, Les Bayards, and Serrières m. Henriette de Tribolet
    - 1> Samuel Henri (1759-1810), pastor m. (1786) Marie Anne Petitpierre
      - 1> "Charlotte" Henriette (1788-1813)
        - m. (1) Auguste de Perrot
        - m. (2) Jean Jacques "François" Vaucher
      - 2> Sophie Marianne (1792-1877) m. (1813) Charles Auguste de Pury
    - 2> Jacques Louis (1761-1835) m. (1790) Marie "Henriette" Salomé de Boyve
      - 1> Adélaïde Marianne (1792-1874) m. (1816) Pierre André Doxat
      - 2> Adolphe (1800-1880)
        - m. (1828) Julie Anne Charlotte May
        - m. (1835) Fanny Bovet
      - 3> Edouard (1802-1885) m. (1835) Sophie de Pury
    - 3> Paul Gabriel (1766-1856), chamberlain to the King of Prussia m. Joséphine Guibert de Sissac
      - > Sophie Frédérique (1801-1896) m. (1829) Karl Alfred von Graffenried
    - 4> Paul
  - 5> Jean Jacques (1727 - )
  - 6> Henriette (1729-1803) m. (1762) François Alphonse Gibollet
  - 7> Anne (1731-1732)
  - 8> Sophie (1733-1741)
  - 9> Jean Jérémie (1734-1796), captain in the service of Prussia and Russia
  - 10> Paul (1735-1821), Council member, mayor of Les Verrières m. (1766) Henriette de Genillat
  - 11> Jean Jacques (1738-1738)

== See also ==
- Hôtel de Pourtalès

== Bibliography ==
- Malzac, Louis (1914). Les Pourtalès, histoire d'une famille huguenote des Cévennes, 1500-1860 [The Pourtalès, History of a Huguenot Family from the Cévennes, 1500-1860] (in French). Hachette.
- Lüthy, Herbert (1959). La Banque Protestante en France - De la Révocation de l'Édit de Nantes à la Révolution [The Protestant Bank in France - From the Revocation of the Edict of Nantes to the Revolution] (in French). Paris: S.E.V.P.E.N.
- Bergeron, Louis (1970). "Pourtalès et Cie, 1753-1801: apogée et déclin d'un capitalisme" [Pourtalès and Cie, 1753-1801: Rise and Decline of a Capitalism]. Annales: Économies, Sociétés, Civilisations (in French). 25 (2): 498–517. doi:10.3406/ahess.1970.422231.
- Grossmann, Robert (1995). Comtesse de Pourtalès, une cour française dans l'Alsace impériale 1836 – 1870 – 1914 [Countess de Pourtalès, a French Court in Imperial Alsace 1836–1870–1914] (in French). Magnard.
- Cramer, Robert (2000). Les Pourtalès 1300-2000 [The Pourtalès 1300-2000] (in French). Éditions familiales.
- Fässler, Hans (2007). Une Suisse esclavagiste. Voyage dans un pays au-dessus de tout soupçon. (Préface de Doudou Diène) [A Slaveholding Switzerland. Journey Through a Country Above Suspicion. (Preface by Doudou Diène)] (in French). Paris: Duboiris. pp. 165–177.

=== External links ===
- "Société genevoise de généalogie" [Geneva Genealogical Society]. gen-gen.ch (in French). Archived from the original on 2016-03-03.
- Volorio Perriard, Myriam (2010-02-23). "Pourtalès (de)" [Historical Dictionary of Switzerland]. Dictionnaire historique de la Suisse (in French).
