= Château de Pourtalès =

Château in Strasbourg, France

Coordinates: 48°36′30″N 7°48′00″E

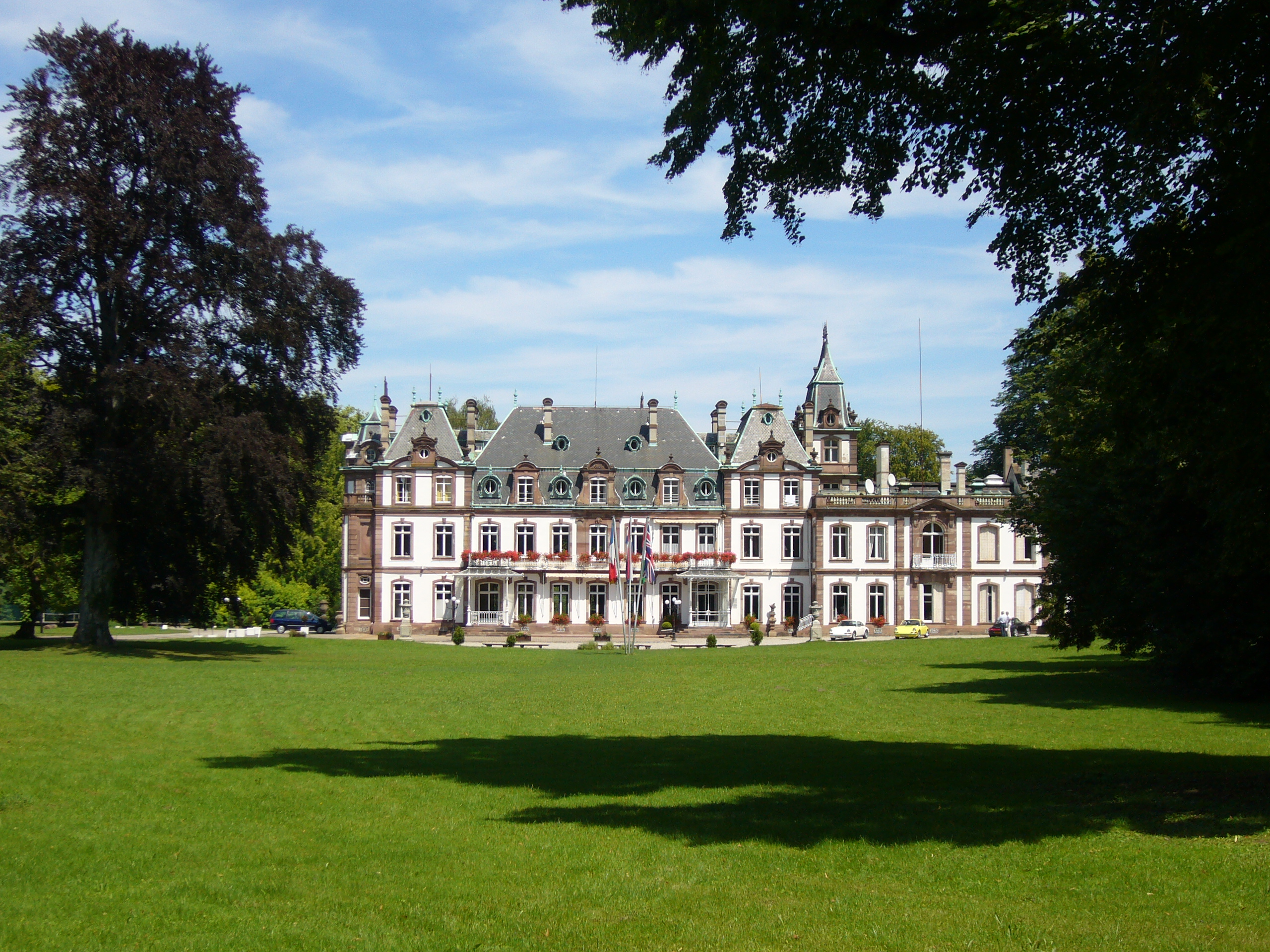
Château de Pourtalès

Château de Pourtalès (or Château de Robertsau) is a château situated in the Robertsau district of Strasbourg, France. It's dated to the 18th century and named after the Pourtalès family.

== History ==
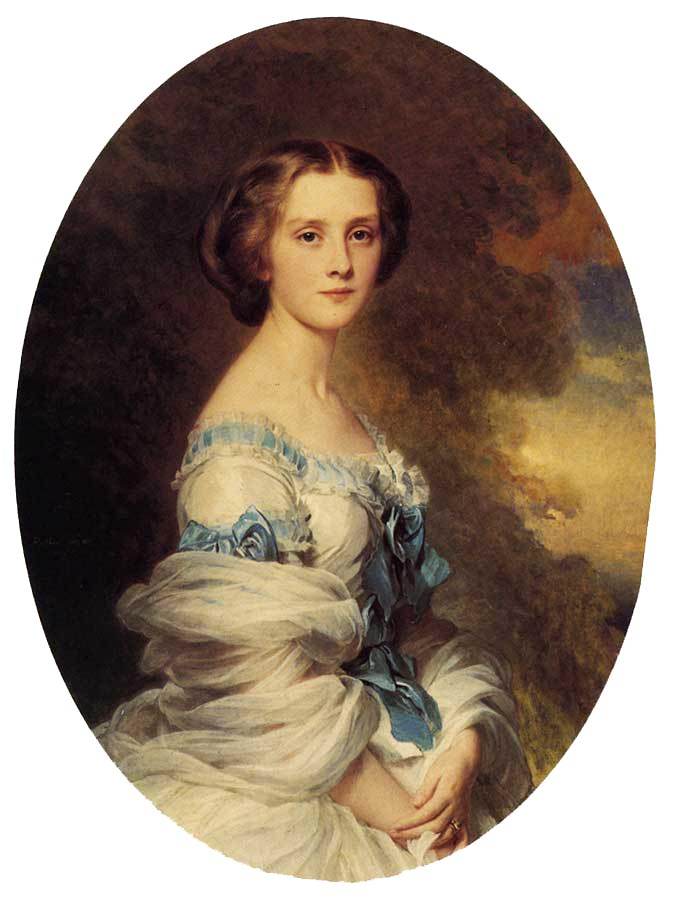
Portrait of the Comtesse Mélanie by Winterhalter, 1857

The Château de Pourtalès was built around 1750 as a small manor house in the Robertsau neighborhood by Joseph Guérault, then contractor of the works of the king in charge of the construction of the fortifications of Strasbourg. In 1802, Baron Paul-Athanase Renouard de Bussierre, who was from a wealthy industrial family from Strasbourg, bought the house and expanded the manor into a gracious Château. Between 1870 and 1914, the château was the residence of Comtesse Mélanie de Pourtalès (née de Bussière) and her husband, Count Edmond de Pourtalès (a son of the Swiss banker and art collector, Count James-Alexandre de Pourtalès). Comtesse Mélanie, a renowned French salonnière and Lady-in-waiting to Empress Eugénie, was the only surviving child of Baron Alfred Renouard de Bussière, head of the Royal Mint of Paris.

During the Franco-Prussian War of 1870, the château suffered fire damage. Prominent guests of the château included European aristocracy and members of the arts, including Albert Schweitzer, Franz Liszt, Napoléon III and his wife, the Empress Eugénie, the Princes of Belgium and Russia, Ludwig I of Bavaria, the Grand Duke of Baden and the Princess Metternich.

After Comtesse Mélanie's death in 1914, the château was inherited by her youngest daughter, Agnès de Pourtalès, who was married to Henri, Marquis de Löys-Chandieu (who had been engaged to Victoria Sackville-West before her marriage to Baron Sackville).

During World War I, it was occupied by the Germans, and later liberated by the Americans. The owners of the château in 1939 closed the property and during World War II, it was confiscated by the Germans and used to house high-ranking officers before it was occupied by Allied Forces for a short period following the war. After the War, it was the site an Eastern European University for a short time, but was closed again following the construction of the Berlin Wall.

In 1972, the nearly falling down château was bought by Walter Leibrecht, the founder of Schiller International University, to house students of the university. For more than 25 years, Schiller's students resided in the château.

=== Hotel Château de Pourtalès ===
In 2009, the Château de Pourtalès was converted to a hotel and has housed many Members of the European Parliament during the session.
