= Mélanie de Pourtalès =

Mélanie, Comtesse Edmond de Pourtalès
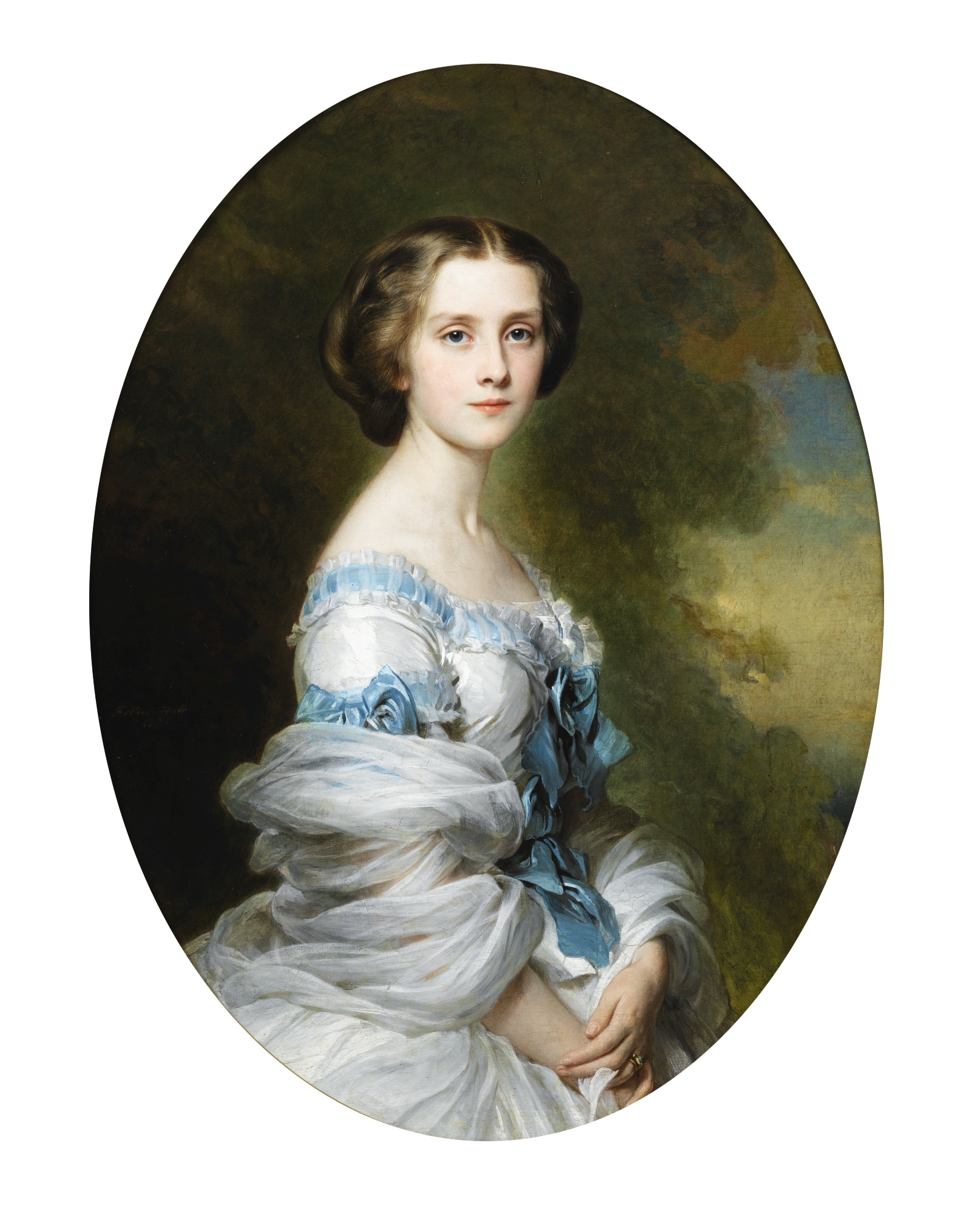
- Portrait of the Comtesse by Winterhalter, 1857
- Born: Louise Sophie Mélanie Renouard de Bussière; 26 March 1836; Strasbourg, France
- Died: 5 May 1914 (aged 78)
- Known for: Lady-in-waiting to Empress Eugénie
- Spouse: Count Edmond de Pourtalès (m. 1857; died 1895)
- Children: 5
- Parent(s): Sophie Mélanie de Coehoorn; Baron Alfred Renouard de Bussière

Mélanie de Pourtalès, Countess Edmond de Pourtalès (née Louise Sophie Mélanie Renouard de Bussière) (26 March 1836 – 5 May 1914) was a French salonnière and courtier.

== Early life ==
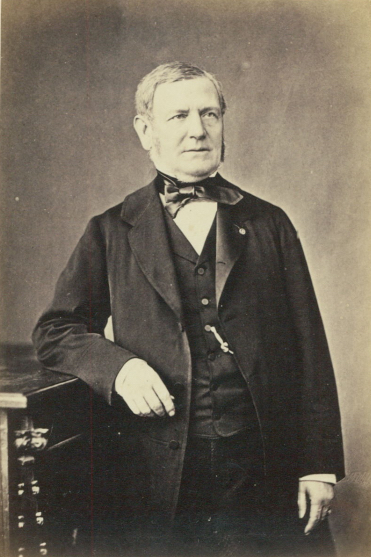
Her father Baron Alfred Renouard de Bussière

She was born on 26 March 1836 at the Château de Robertsau in Strasbourg, to the former Sophie Mélanie de Coehoorn (1802–1880), and Baron Alfred Renouard de Bussière (1804–1887), who was from a wealthy Strasbourg industrial family. He was director of the Royal Mint of Strasbourg from 1834 to 1860, before being appointed head of the Royal Mint of Paris.

Her paternal grandparents were Athanase Paul Renouard, Vicomte de Bussière and the former Friederike Wilhelmine von Franck. Her uncle was Léon Renouard de Bussierre. Her maternal grandparents were Louis Jacques, Baron de Coehoorn and the former Marie Margarethe Sophie von Beyer.

== Courtier ==
She was introduced to the French imperial court by the Austrian ambassador, Richard von Metternich, and appointed as lady-in-waiting to the empress, Eugénie de Montijo, the wife of Napoleon III.

Pourtalès' salon was regarded as one of the most famed during the Second French Empire, when she was one of the leading figures in Parisian high society and imperial court life. In her letters, she writes about the pending marriage of Antonin-Just-Léon-Marie de Noailles, Duc de Mouchy to the Princess Anne Murat, daughter of Prince Lucien Murat and granddaughter of the King of Naples Joachim Murat and Queen Caroline (younger sister of the Emperor Napoleon).

According to French writer Alfred Mézières, "three people saw clearly what was coming before 1870, Lieutenant-Colonel Stoffel, General Ducrot, and Madame de Pourtalès." (Note: The Siege of Paris, which began in 1870, led to the capture of the city by Prussian forces, which led to French defeat in the Franco-Prussian War and the establishment of the German Empire as well as the Paris Commune.)

== Personal life ==
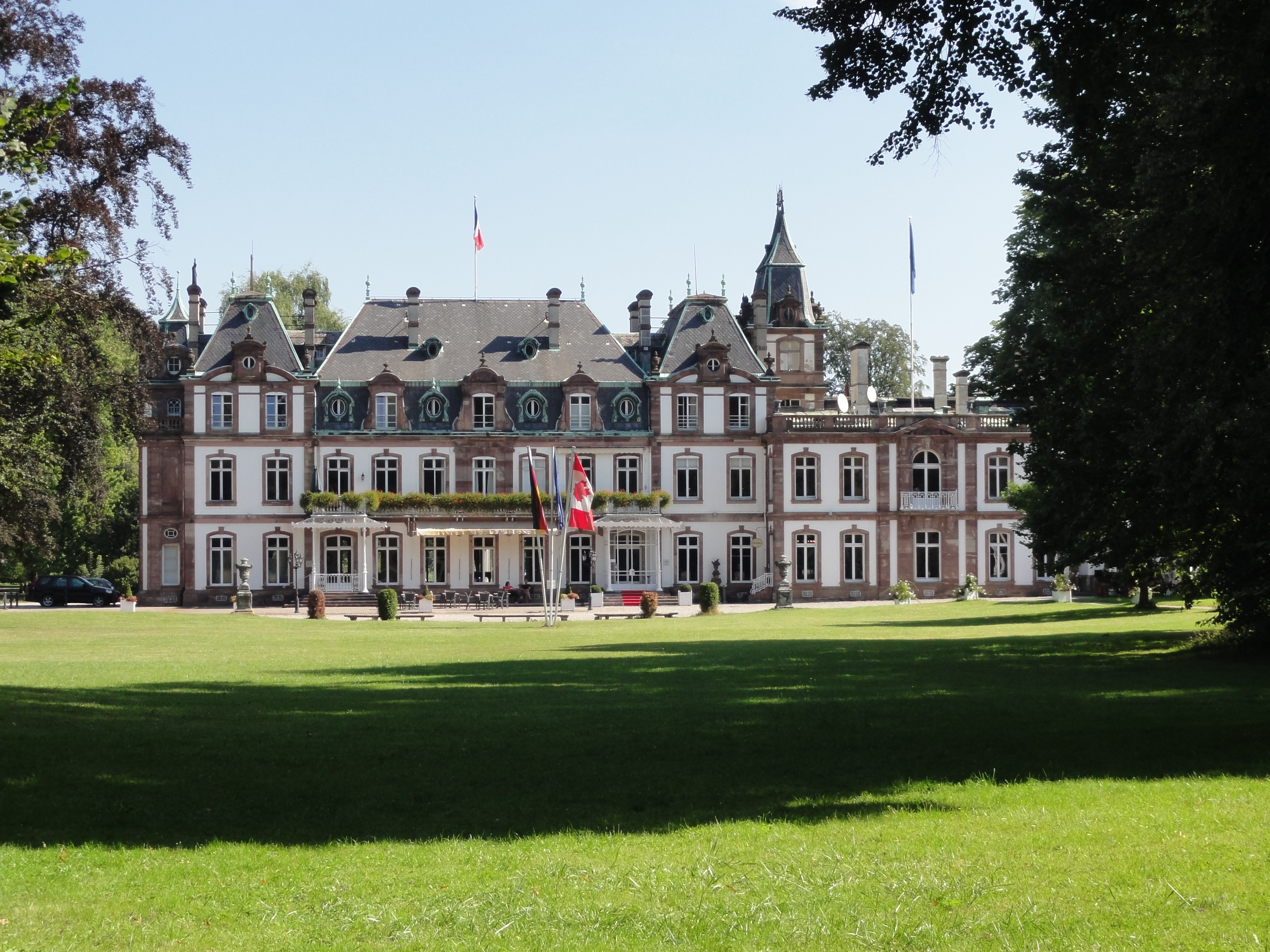
Château de Pourtalès.

On 30 June 1857, she married banker Count Edmond de Pourtalès (1828–1895), a son of Count James-Alexandre de Pourtalès of the Château de Gorgier, a prominent banker and art collector who had served as chamberlain the King of Prussia Frederick William III. Count Edmond's elder sister, Élisa de Pourtalès was the wife of French diplomat Charles-Alexandre, Marquis de Ganay. Together, they were the parents of:

- Jacques de Pourtalès (1858–1919), who married Jacqueline Conquerré de Montbrison (1871–1925), later the Countess Wladimir Rehbinder after their divorce.
- Paul de Pourtalès (1859–1933), a Saint-Cyrien, politician and head of the Longchamp Racecourse.
- Hubert Louis Edmond de Pourtalès (1863–1949), who married Marguerite de Schickler (1870–1956), a daughter of Arthur, Baron von Schickler. Hubert owned Château Martinvast in Normandy, the "most famous racing establishment and stud farm in France."
- Élisabeth de Pourtalès (1867–1952), who married Christian Egenolf François, Baron de Berckheim (1853–1935), a grandson of the Marquis de Jaucourt, in 1886.
- Mélanie Agnès de Pourtalès (1870–1930), who in 1890 married the equally wealthy Henri, Marquis de Löys-Chandieu, who had been engaged to Victoria Sackville-West before her marriage to Baron Sackville.

The Count de Pourtalès died in 1895. The Countess died on 5 May 1914. After her death, her daughter Agnès inherited the Château de la Robertsau.

=== Residences ===
From her father, she inherited the family's château, the Château de la Robertsau (which today is known as the Château de Pourtalès) in the département of Bas-Rhin, Alsace. At their château, they hosted Franz Liszt, Napoléon III, Empress Eugénie, the Princes of Belgium and Russia, Ludwig I of Bavaria, the Grand Duke of Baden and the Princess Metternich.

Her husband inherited the Pourtalès mansion, a hôtel particulier (essentially a grand townhouse) on Rue Tronchet in the 8th arrondissement of Paris that was built for his father between 1838 and 1839 by Félix Duban.

=== Descendants ===
Through her youngest daughter Agnès, she was a grandmother of Edmée de Loys-Chandieu (1892–1945), who married Alexander, Count of Hoyos, son of Georg Anton, Count of Hoyos and the former Alice Whitehead (daughter of British engineer Robert Whitehead). Alexander's aunt, Marguerite, was married to Herbert von Bismarck, the eldest son of Chancellor Otto von Bismarck. Edmée's daughter, Melanie Hoyos, also married a member of the Bismarck family, Count Gottfried von Bismarck-Schönhausen, and their descendants include Stephanie zu Guttenberg.

Gallery

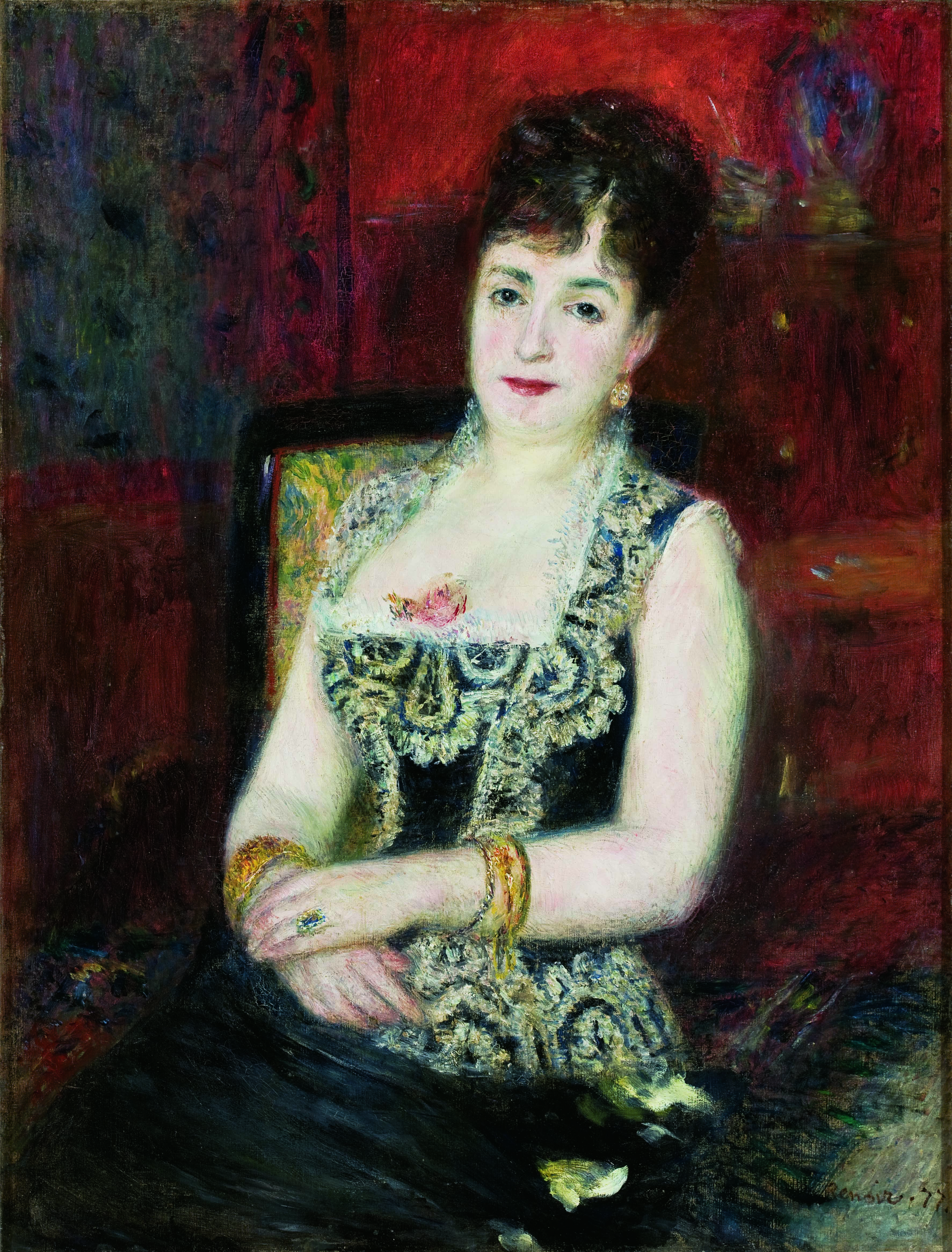
Portrait of Comtesse de Pourtalès by Pierre-Auguste Renoir, 1877

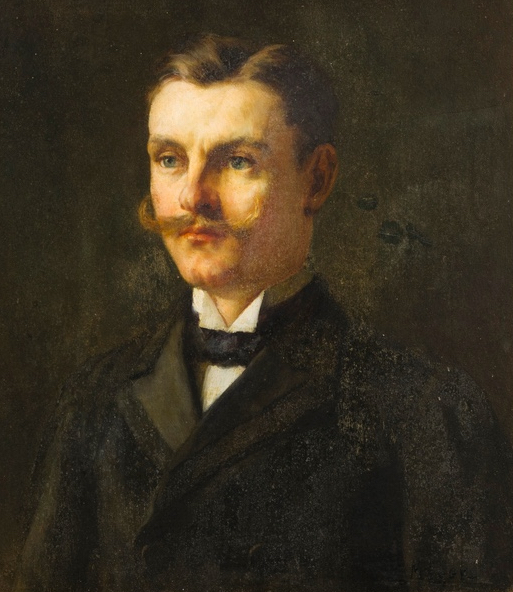
Portrait of her son, Count Hubert de Pourtalès, by Marguerite Schickler de Pourtalès, 1892

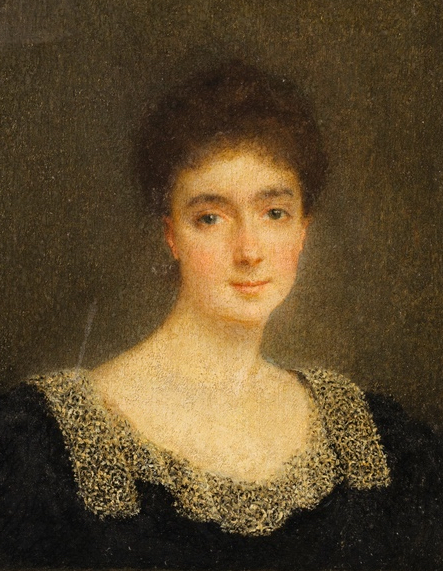
Portrait of her daughter-in-law, Marguerite, Comtesse Hubert de Pourtalès, by Lucien Lévy-Dhurmer

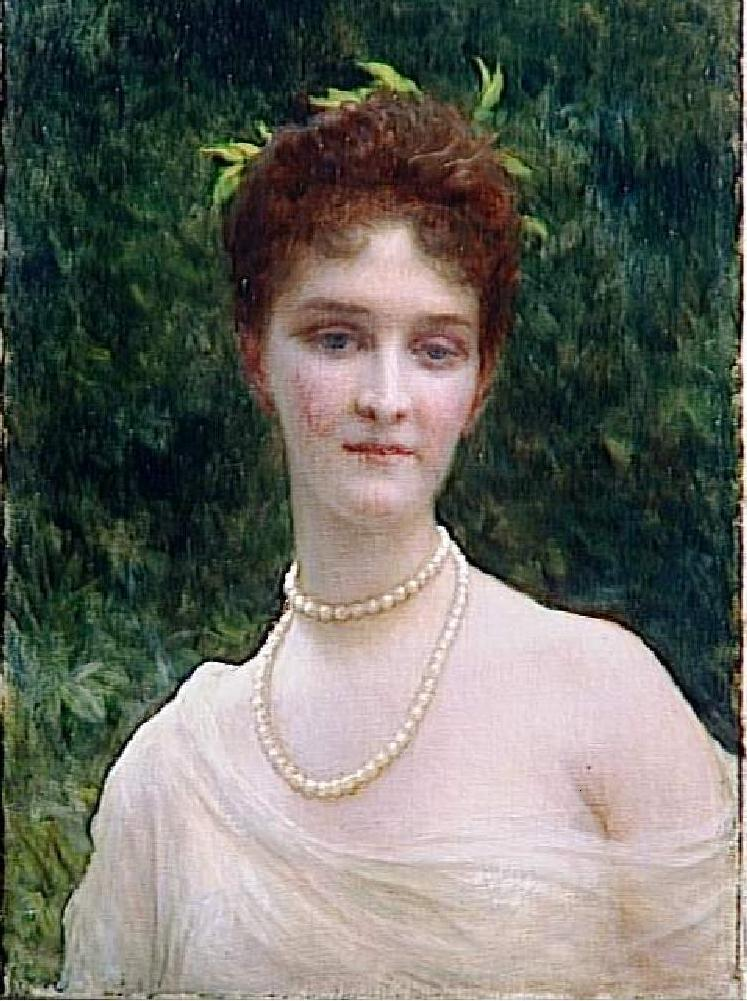
Her daughter, Agnès de Pourtalès, Marquise de Loys-Chandieu, by Ernest Hébert
