= Luins Castle =

Castle in Luins, Switzerland

- Luins in Switzerland
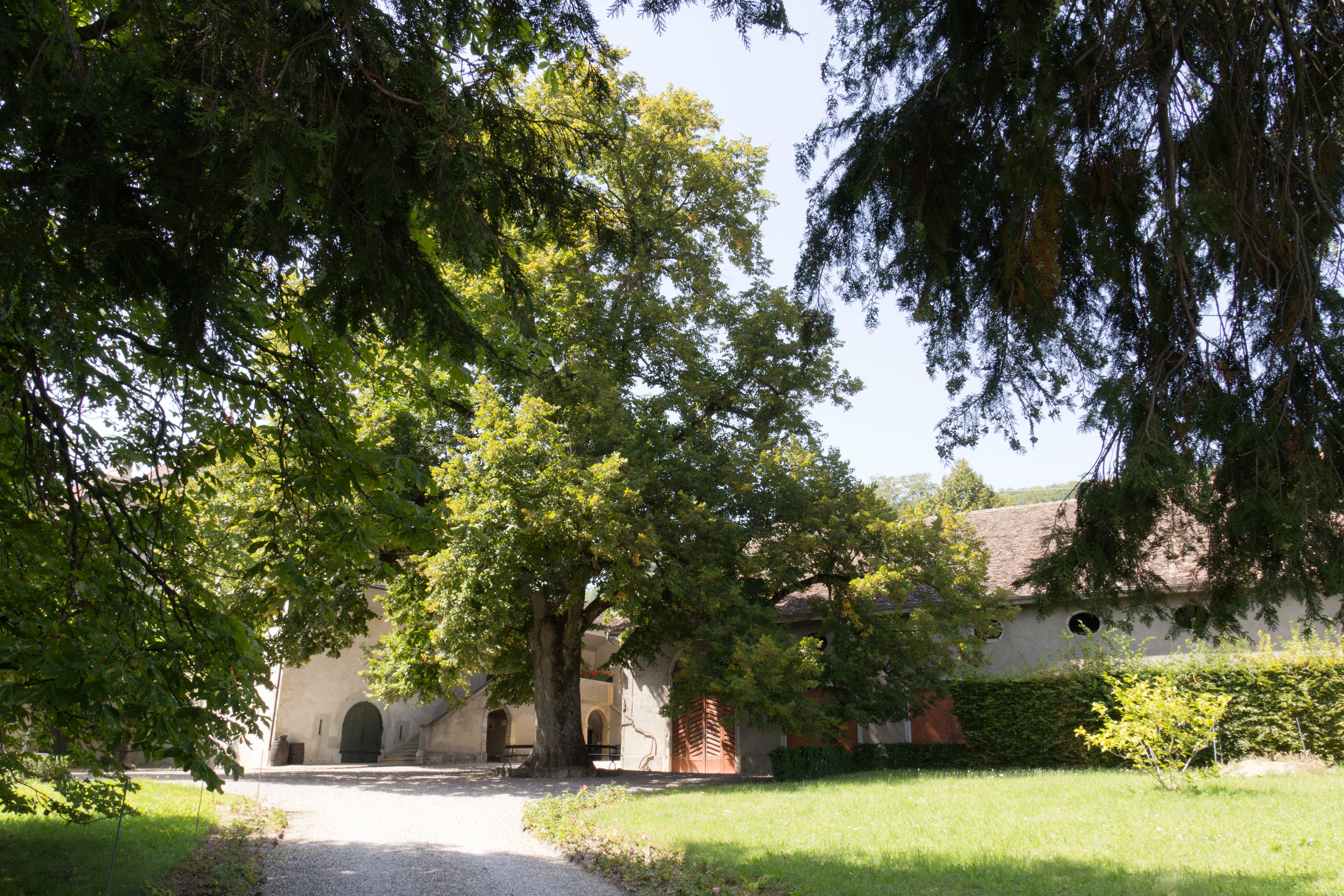

Site information
- Owner: Baechtold family

Location
- Coordinates: 46°26′40″N 6°16′18″E

Site history
- Built: 14th century

Garrison information
- Occupants: de Cossonay family

Swiss Cultural Property of National Significance

Luins Castle (also known as the Château de Luins) is a castle in the municipality of Luins of the Canton of Vaud in Switzerland. It is a Swiss heritage site of national significance. It was purchased by James-Alexandre de Pourtalès in 1809.

== See also ==
- List of castles in Switzerland
- Château
