= James-Alexandre de Pourtalès =

Swiss-French art collector and private banker (1776–1855)

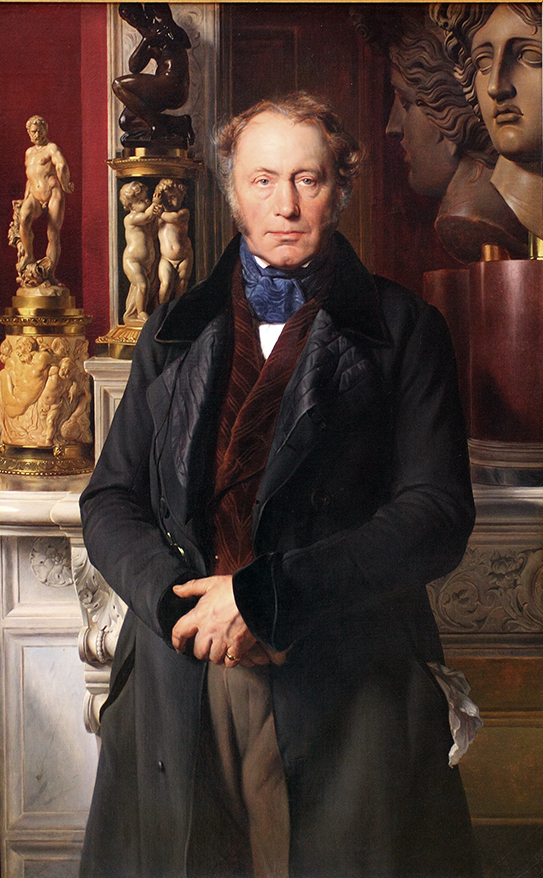
- Portrait of the Comte de Pourtalès-Gorgier, by Paul Delaroche, c. 1846.
- Born: November 28, 1776; Neuchâtel, Principality of Neuchatel
- Died: March 24, 1855 (aged 78); Paris, Second French Empire
- Spouse: Anne Henriette de Palézieux-Falconnet (m. 1809; died 1836)
- Children: 6
- Father: Jacques-Louis de Pourtalès

James-Alexandre de Pourtalès, Comte de Pourtalès-Gorgier (28 November 1776 – 24 March 1855) was a Swiss-French banker, diplomat and art collector.

== Early life ==
James-Alexandre Pourtalès was born on 28 November 1776 in Neuchâtel, Principality of Neuchâtel, into the Pourtalès family, a large family of Protestant financiers. He was the son of Countess Rose Augustine Marie de Luze (1751–1791) and Jacques-Louis de Pourtalès (1722–1814), a banker in Naples who amassed a fortune in commerce and was made a count by King Frederick William II. Among his siblings were Louis de Pourtalès (husband of Sophie d'Audanger) and Frédéric de Pourtalès (husband of Marie Louise de Castellane and grandfather of Friedrich von Pourtalès).

His paternal grandparents were Jérémie de Pourtalès and Marguerite de Luze (who was the younger sister of his maternal great-grandfather). The Pourtalès family were French Huguenots who settled in Neuchâtel following the revocation of the Edict of Nantes in 1685. His maternal grandparents were the former Marianne-Françoise Warney (a niece of Daniel Roguin of Yverdon) and Baron Jean-Jacques III de Luze, a prosperous textile manufacturer at Colombier and were both friends of writer and philosopher Jean-Jacques Rousseau. (Note: The philosopher Jean-Jacques Rousseau described his grandfather, Jean-Jacques de Luze, whom he had been friends with for many years, as "having a cold manner but a warm heart."). They had an elegant country house near Governor George Keith's château in what was then the Principality of Neuchâtel.

== Career ==
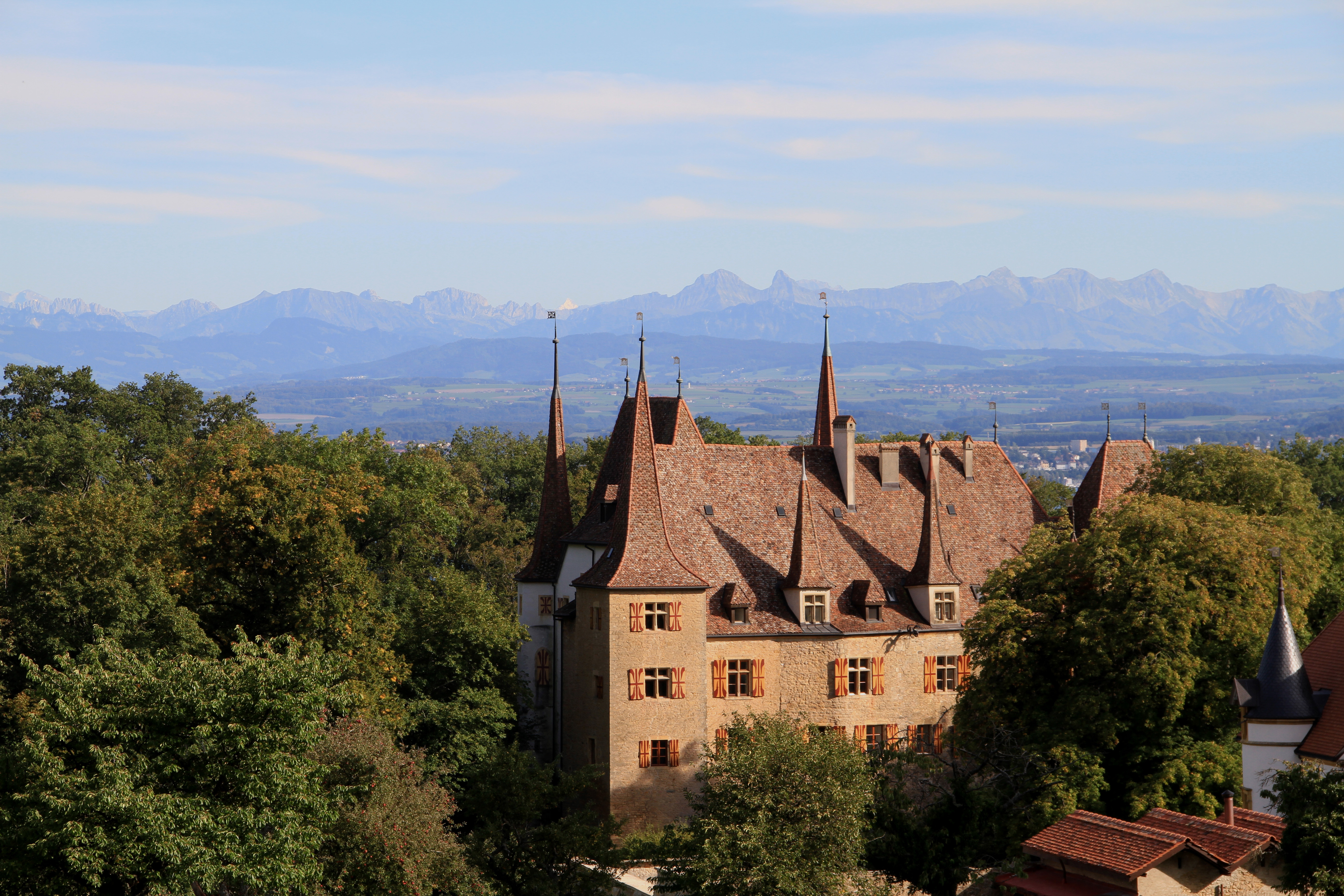
Pourtalès' Château de Gorgier.

In 1813, he acquired the seigneury of Gorgier, which he added to the family name, from Charles Henry, Vicomte de Gorgier. (Note: In 1831, Pourtalès, as the Lord of Gorgier, ceded his jurisdiction to the sovereign, keeping the château as a fief and various properties that depended on it. Pourtalès' eldest son Henri de Pourtalès-Gorgier succeeded his father and was the last Lord of Gorgier. In 1848, he entered into an arrangement with the government at the time of the founding of the Republic, concerning certain seigneurial rights which had been reserved during the direct meeting in 1831. The Pourtalès family sold the Château de Gorgier to Alphonse Berthoud in 1879.) He served as Chamberlain to the King of Prussia and was awarded the title of Count on 20 November 1814 by King Frederick William III, who ruled Prussia during the Napoleonic Wars and the end of the Holy Roman Empire. Pourtalès freed the Bérochaux from cartage chores in 1822 and, in recognition, received a bench with his coat of arms at the church. From 1816 to 1829, he was a member of the General Audiences.

=== Residences and art collection ===
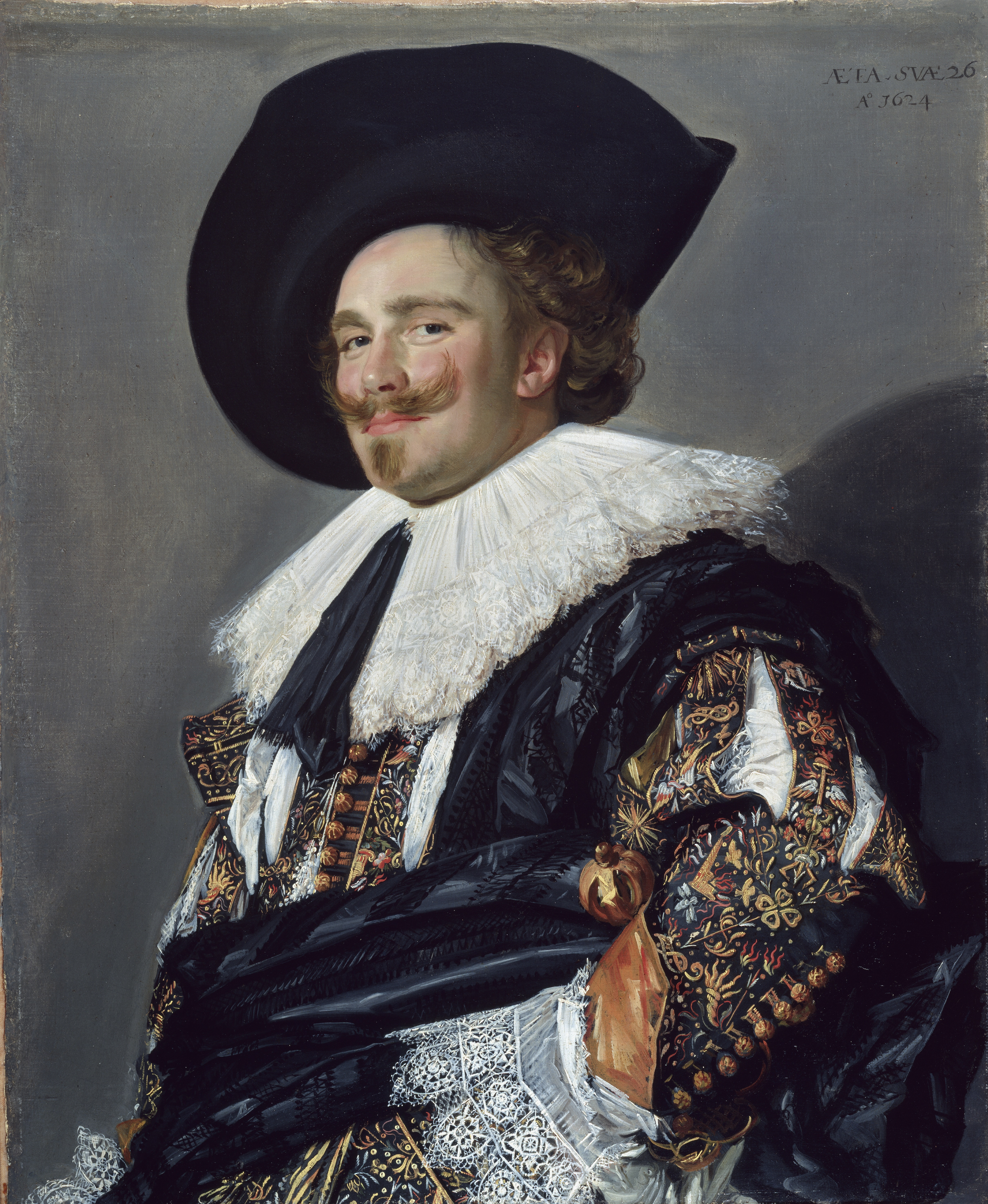
The Laughing Cavalier by Frans Hals, which was owned by Pourtalès.

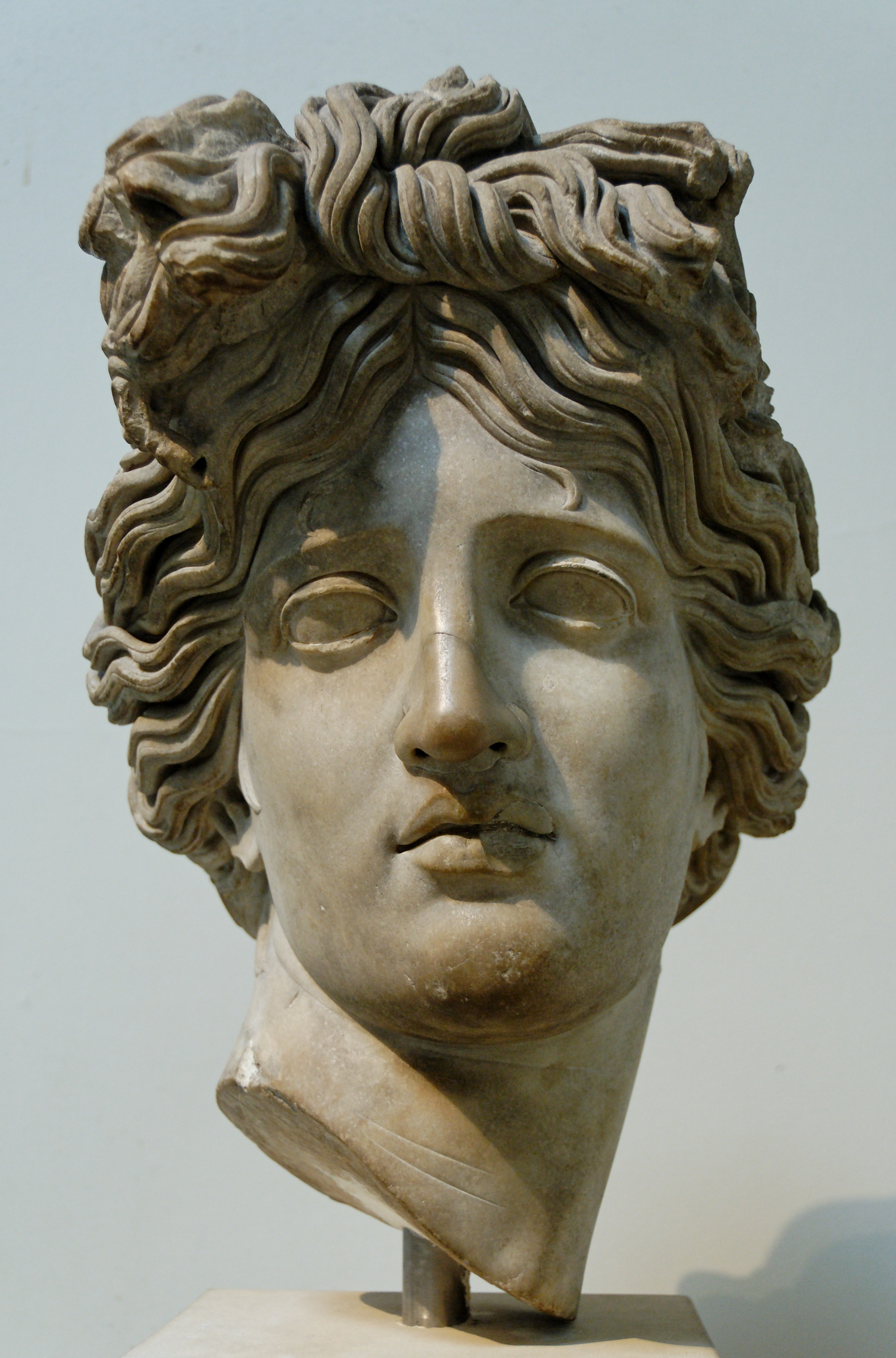
Pourtalès' Head of Apollo, that was once in the collection of Vincenzo Giustiniani.

In 1815, he settled in Paris before residing in a mansion in the Place Vendôme in the 1st arrondissement of Paris. Between 1838 and 1839, Pourtalès had Félix Duban build the Pourtalès mansion, a hôtel particulier (essentially a grand townhouse) on rue Tronchet, Paris. At his mansion, Pourtalès assembled one of the most important collections of antiques and paintings of his time, including the Laughing Cavalier by Frans Hals and works by Bronzino, Rembrandt, Jean-Auguste-Dominique Ingres and a Sandro Botticelli portrait. In 1825, he donated a mummy and coffin he acquired from the Thedenat-Duvent sale, to the Berlin Museum. In February and March 1865, ten years after his death, his collection was auctioned off in Paris in accordance with his will. The majority of his collection was photographed and published in a large folio by Goupil & Cie. The Laughing Cavalier was purchased by the Marquess of Hertford (who outbid Baron de Rothschild). Lord Amherst bought some of the important Egyptian objects. Sir Charles Newton spent 60,919 francs on bronzes and vases for the British Museum, and 47,000 francs on Giustiniani's Apollo.

In 1806, he purchased the Château de Bandeville in Saint-Cyr-sous-Dourdan where, in 1833, he had the English-style park redeveloped by landscape designer Louis-Sulpice Varé, in one of the first known works. Today, Varé is known for his French landscape gardens at several famous chateaux, including the Château de Châtenay-en-France, and the Bois de Boulogne park.

In 1809, he also acquired Château de Luins in the Swiss Canton of Vaud for 150,000 Swiss francs. The estate passed to his eldest daughter and her husband, the Marquis de Ganay, and their family.

== Personal life ==
On 12 June 1809, he was married to Anne Henriette de Palézieux-Falconnet (1792–1836) in Neuchâtel. His wife was a daughter of banker Jean Louis de Palézieux-Falconnet and the former Anna Hunter, an American who was the sister of William Hunter, a U.S. Senator from Newport, Rhode Island. His wife's sister, Eliza Augusta, married the American archeologist and artist John Izard Middleton. Together, they were the parents of:

- Élisa Calixte de Pourtalès (1810–1877), who married diplomat Charles-Alexandre, Marquis de Ganay (1803–1881), son of Gen. Antoine-Charles de Ganay, in 1831.
- Cécile de Pourtalès (1812–1833), who married Rodolphe Émile Adolphe de Rougemont (1805–1844) in 1830.
- Henri de Pourtalès-Gorgier (1815–1876), who married Anne Marie d'Escherny (1820–1901) in 1840.
- Charles de Pourtalès (1816–1871).
- Jacques-Robert de Pourtalès (1821–1874), a French politician who married Adèle Anna Hagermann (1825–1898), a daughter of Swedish banker Jonas-Philip Hagerman, in 1846.
- Edmond de Pourtalès-Gorgier (1828–1895), who married Mélanie Renouard de Bussière (1836–1914), a lady-in-waiting to Empress Eugénie, wife of Napoleon III.

Count de Pourtalès died on 24 March 1855.

=== Descendants ===
Through his eldest daughter Élisa, he was a grandfather of General Jacques de Ganay (1843–1899), who married Renée de Maillé de La Tour-Landry, the third daughter of Jaquelin Armand Charles, Duc de Maillé (son of the Duke and Duchess of Maillé) and his wife Jeanne d'Osmond (daughter of Gen. Rainulphe d'Osmond).

Through his son Henri, he was a grandfather of Count Arthur de Pourtalès (1844–1928), a diplomat who twice married Americans.

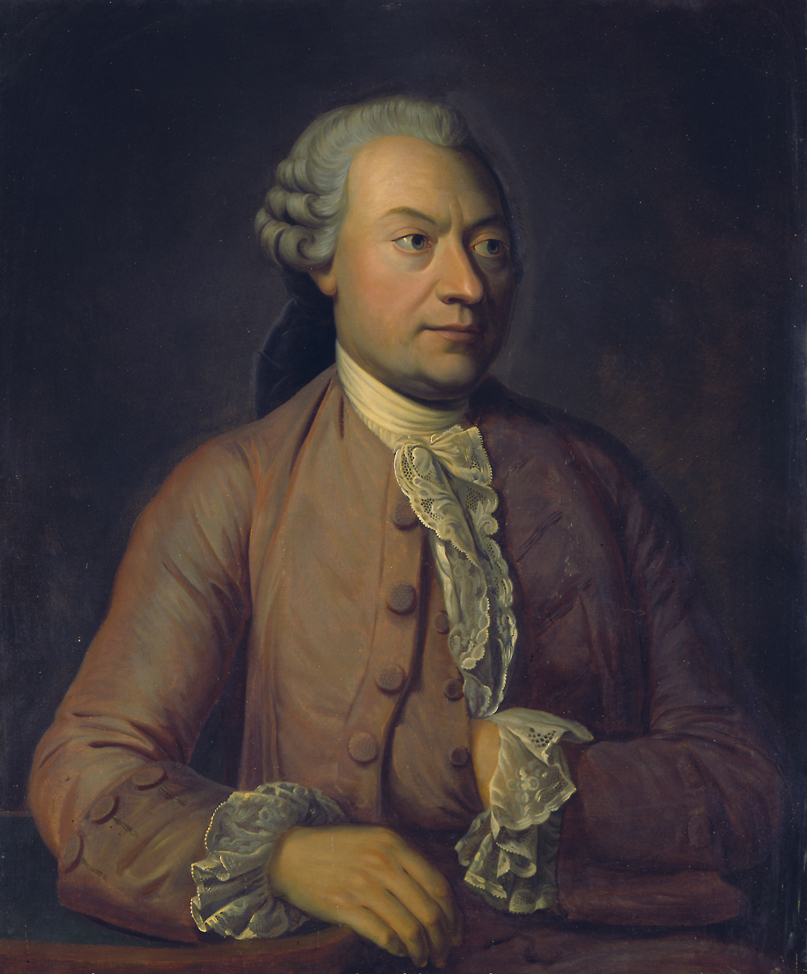
His father, Jacques-Louis de Pourtalès.

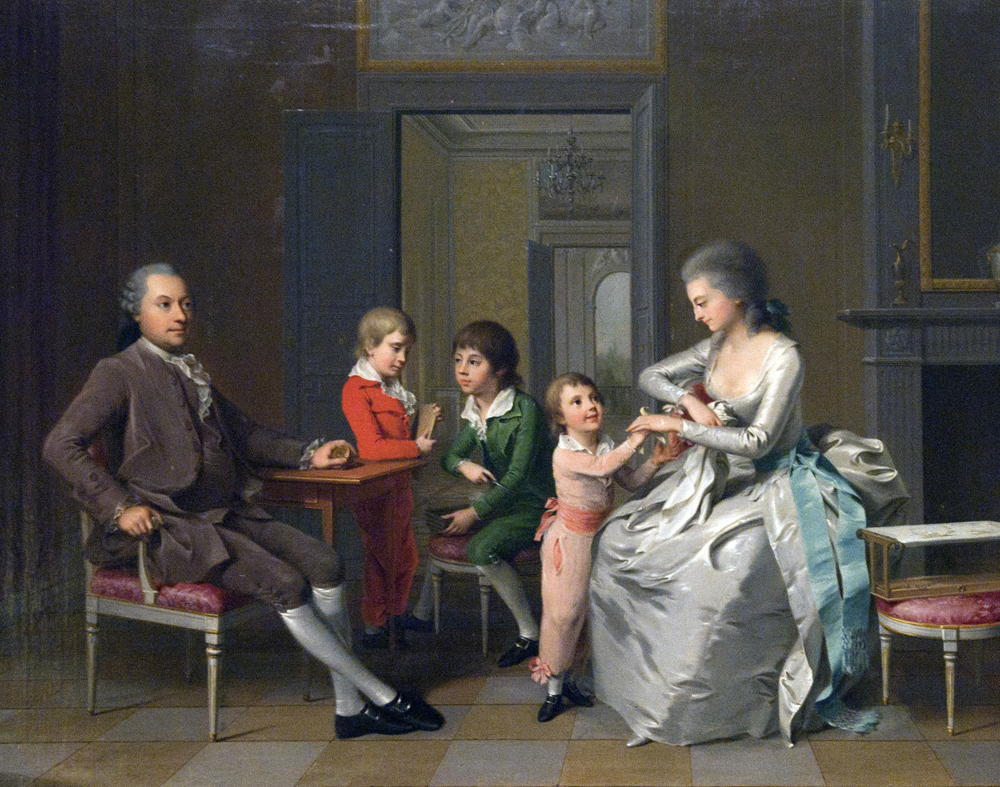
Portrait of his parents and family, c. 1784.

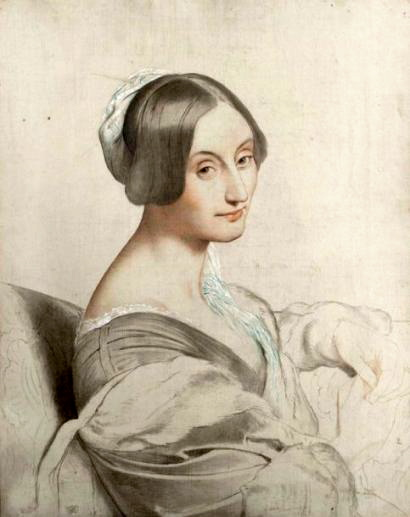
His daughter, Élisa, Marquise de Ganay, c. 1830.

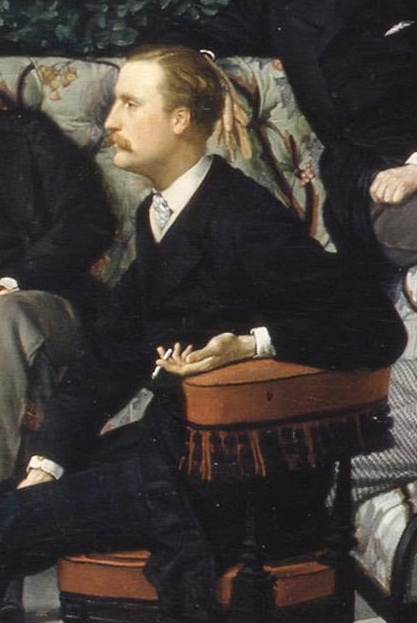
His son-in-law, Charles-Alexandre, Marquis de Ganay, by James Tissot, 1868.

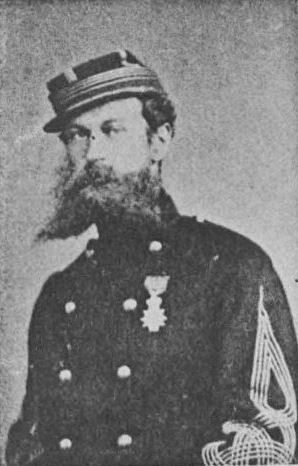
His son, Edmond de Pourtalès, c. 1871.

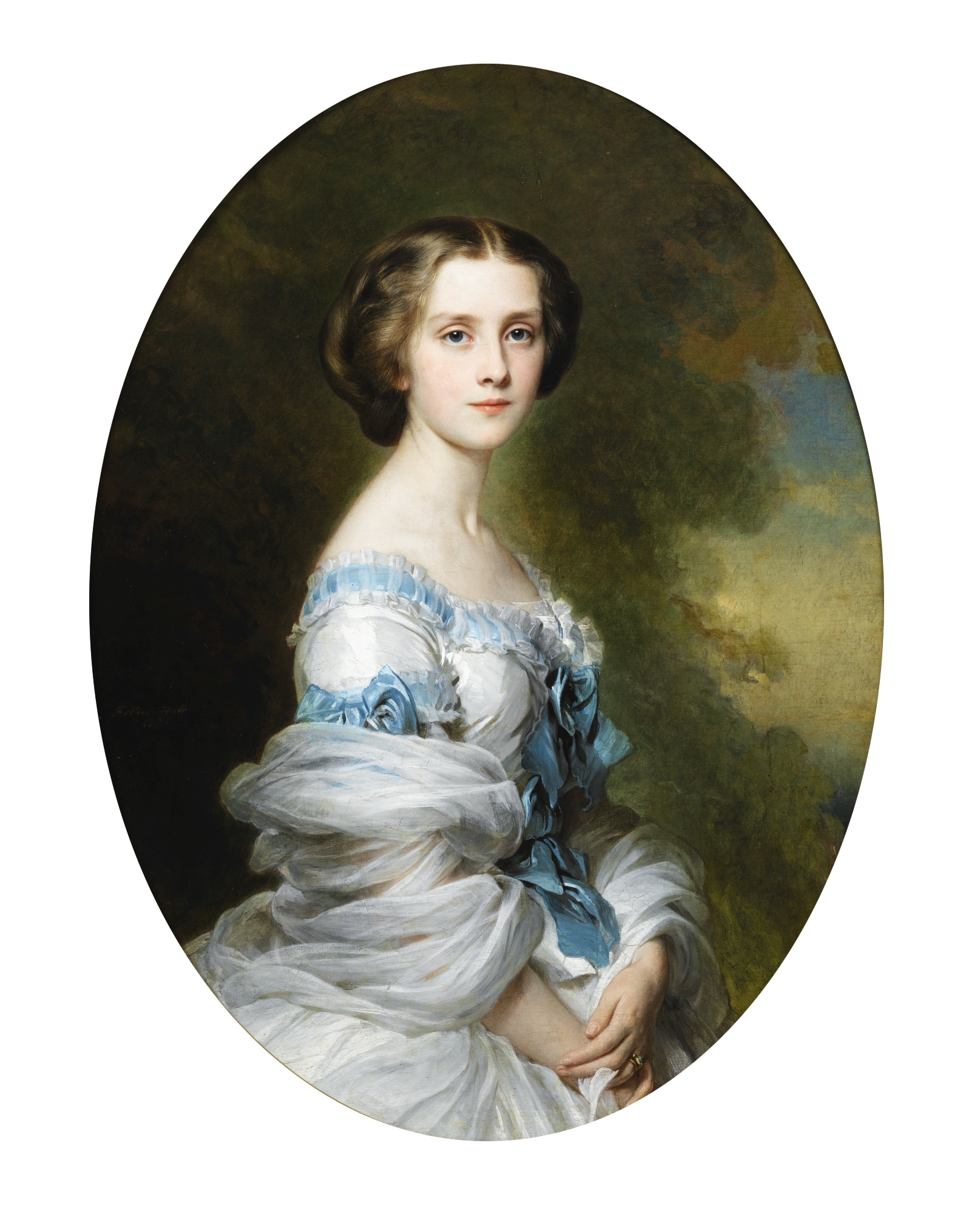
His daughter-in-law, Mélanie de Bussière, by Franz Xaver Winterhalter, 1857.

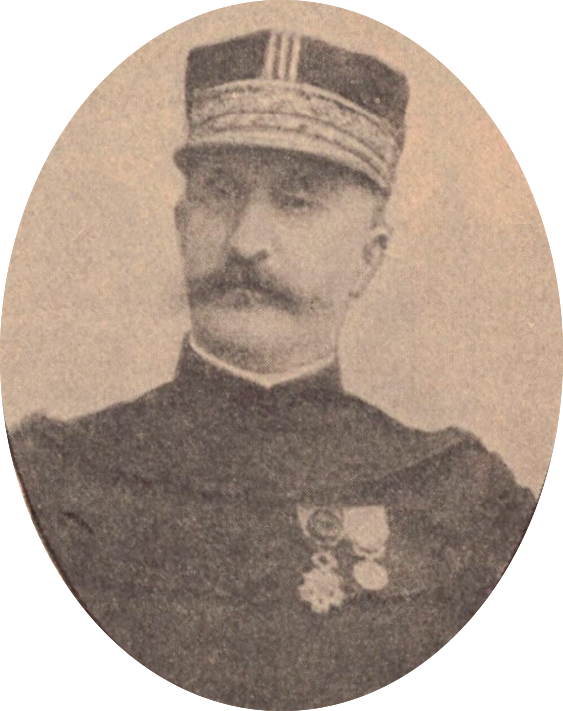
His grandson, Général Jacques de Ganay.

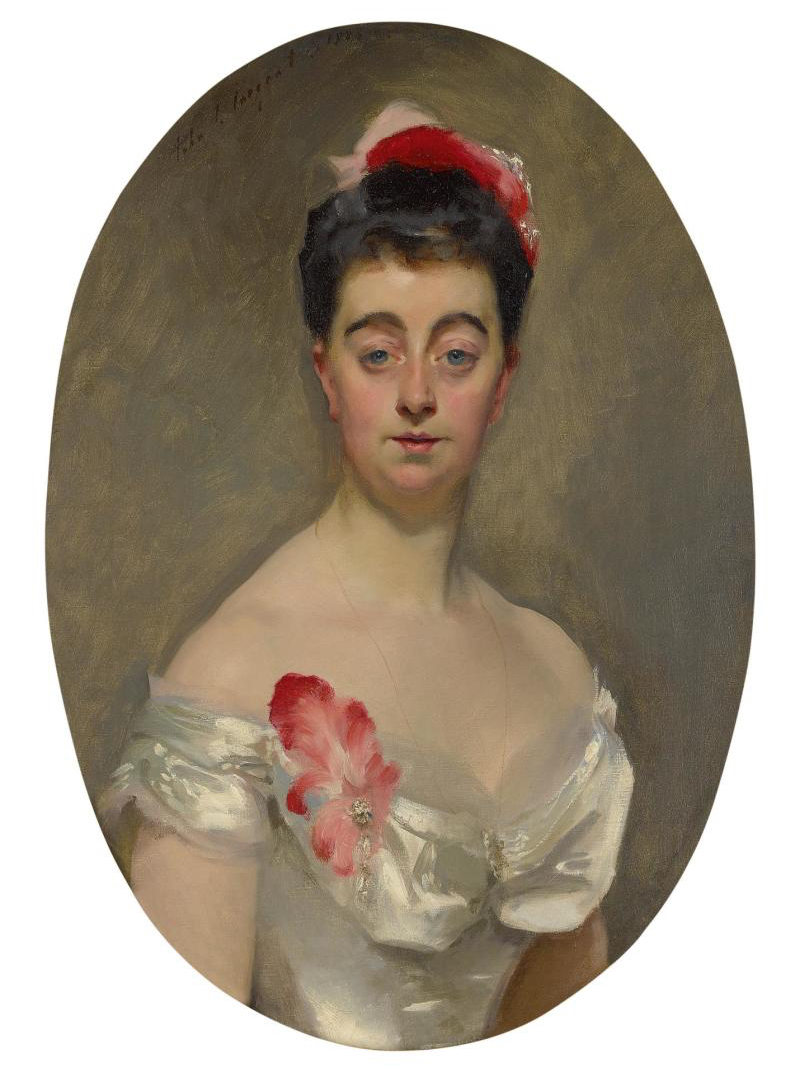
Portrait of his grandson's wife, Renée, the Countess de Ganay, by John Singer Sargent, 1885.

== See also ==
- Comte de Pourtalès Collection
