= Hôtel de Pourtalès =

Historic hôtel particulier in Paris, France

Coordinates: 48.8714°N 2.3252°E

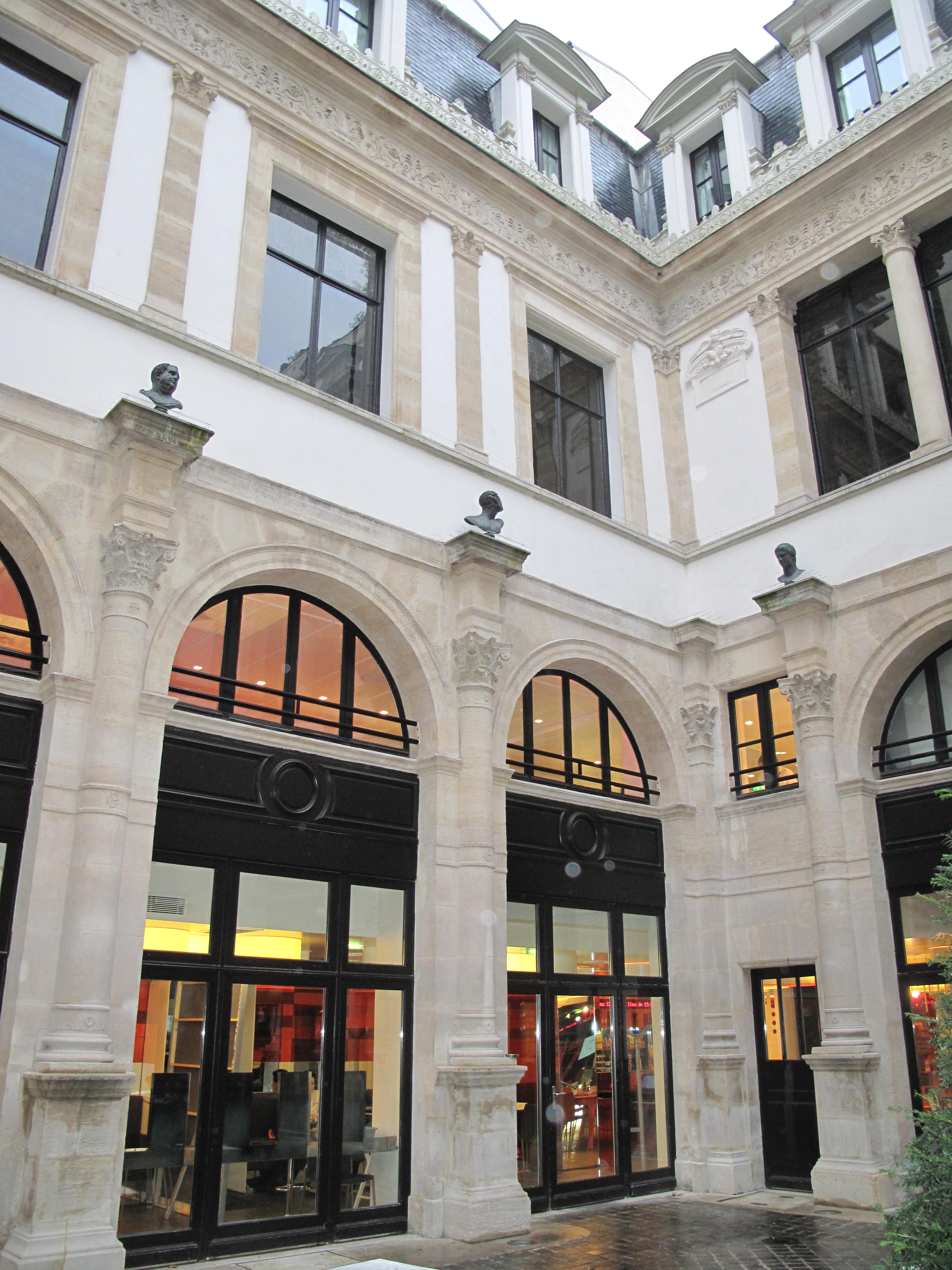
Hôtel de Pourtalès in 2010

The Hôtel de Pourtalès is a historic hôtel particulier, a type of large townhouse of France, at 7 rue Tronchet, close to the Madeleine church, in the 8th arrondissement of Paris. It was designed by architect Félix Duban and built in 1839 for James-Alexandre de Pourtalès, a Swiss-born banker and art collector. It has been listed as an official historical monument since September 17, 2002.

The building is now operated as a luxurious apartment hotel. In October 2016, reality TV personality Kim Kardashian was held at gunpoint and robbed of valuable jewelry by a group of assailants who gained access to her suite in the building.
