= List of American heiresses =

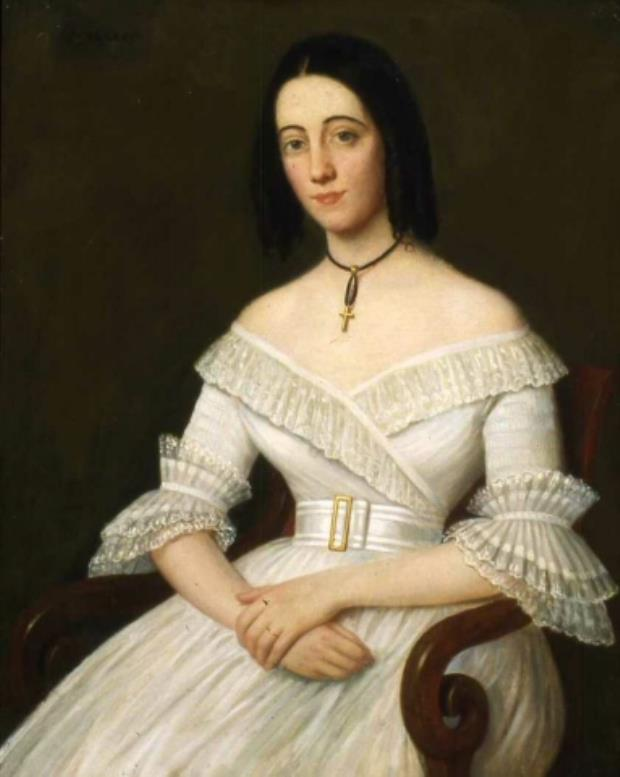
Catherine Murat, Princess Murat (née Catherine Daingerfield Willis)

This is a non-exhaustive list of some American socialites, so called American dollar princesses, from before the Gilded Age to the end of the 20th century, who married into the European titled nobility, peerage, or royalty. The titles in this list are all mentioned or translated into English.

== Before 1865 ==
- Elizabeth Barbé-Marbois, Marquise de Barbé-Marbois [1817] (née Elizabeth Moore) on 17 June 1784
- Mary Pascault, Marquise de Poléon (née Mary Magdalen Slye) on 22 December 1789
- Gertrude Buller, Lady Buller [1808] (née Gertrude Van Cortlandt) on 15 May 1790
- Martha Hottinguer, Baroness Hottinguer [1810] (née Martha Eliza Redwood) on 24 August 1793
- The Hon. Mrs Robert Kennedy (née Jane Macomb) on 22 March 1794
- Doña Sarah McKean Armitage de Martínez de Irujo Tacón, Marquise de Casa Irujo [1803] (née Sarah McKean) on 10 April 1798
- Ann Baring, Lady Baring [1810] and Baroness Ashburton [1835] (née Ann Louisa Bingham) on 23 August 1798
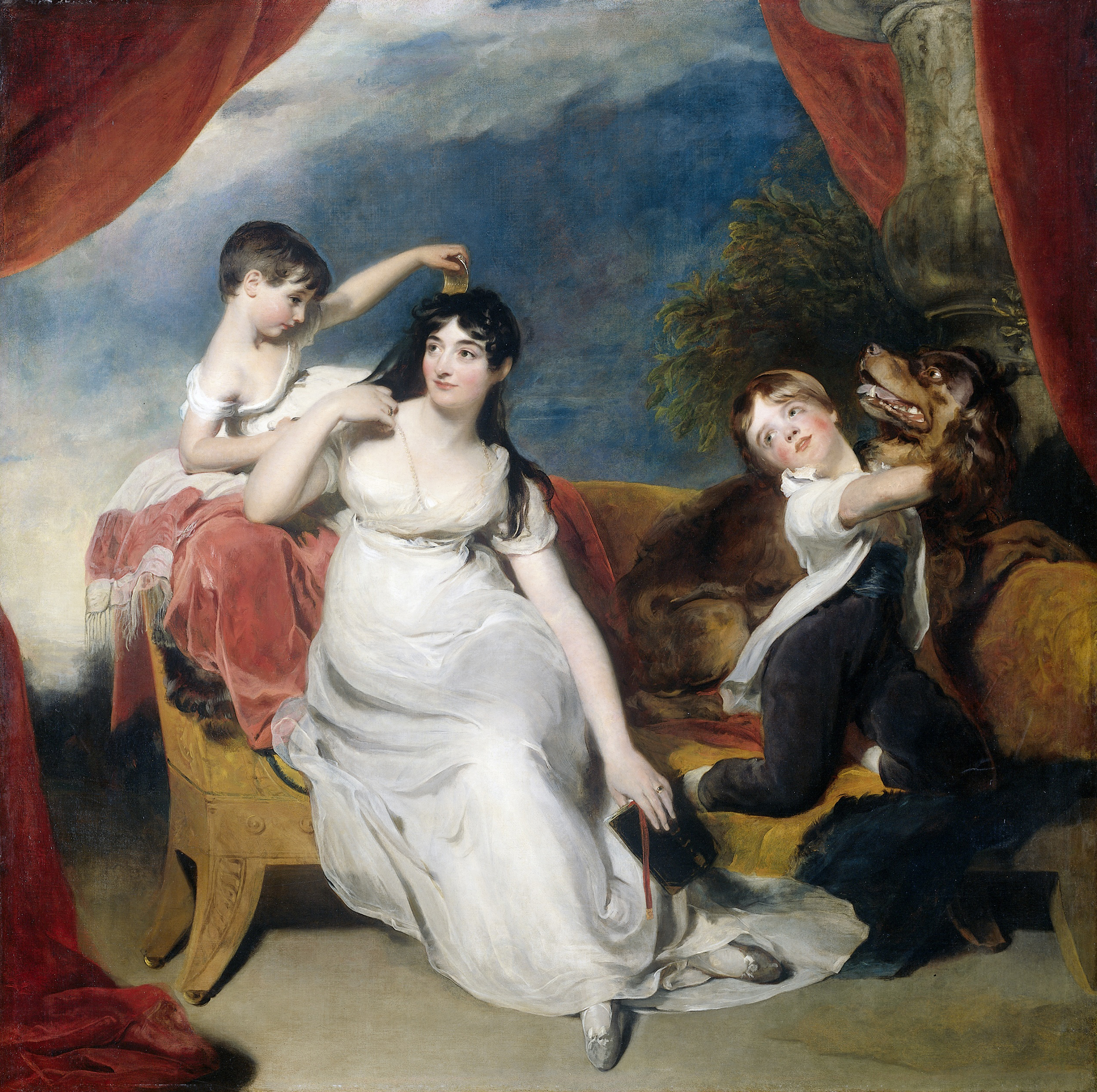
- Maria Matilda, Marquise du Blaisel (née Maria Matilda Bingham)
  Maria de Tilly, Countess de Tilly (née Maria Matilda Bingham, younger sister of Ann Bingham) on 11 April 1799, later Maria du Blaisel, Marquise du Blaisel (previously Maria Baring) on 17 April 1826
- Ann Pascault, Marquise de Poléon (née Ann Goldsborough) on 30 May 1810
- Louisa Hervey-Bathurst, Lady Hervey-Bathurst [1818] (née Louisa Catherine Caton) on 24 April 1817, later Louisa D'Arcy-Osborne, Duchess of Leeds on 24 April 1828
- Eliza, Countess von Rumpff (née Eliza Astor) on 25 October 1825
- Marianne Wellesley, Marchioness Wellesley (née Marianne Caton, previously Patterson, elder sister of Louisa Caton) on 29 October 1825
- Catherine Murat, Princess Murat and Princess of Naples (née Catherine Daingerfield Willis, previously Gray) on 12 July 1826
- Jane Lampson, Lady Lampson (née Jane Walter Sibley) in 1827
- Caroline Murat, Princess Murat and Princess of Pontecorvo (née Caroline Georgina Fraser) on 18 August 1831
- Baroness Camille de Varaigne (née Mary Jauncey Thorne) on 28 March 1832
- Elizabeth Stafford-Jerningham, Baroness Stafford (née Elizabeth Caton, younger sister of Marianne Caton) on 26 May 1836
- Baroness Paul Daniel Gonzalve Grand d'Hauteville (née Ellen Sears) on 22 August 1837
- Jane de Pierres, Baroness de Pierres (née Jane Mary Thorne, sister of Mary Thorne) on 7 June 1842
- Adeline de La Valette, Marquise de La Valette (née Adeline Fowle, previously Welles) in 1842
- Countess Amédée d'Audebert de Férussac (née Alice Adele Thorne, younger sister of Mary and Jane Thorne) on 27 August 1845
- Countess Ferdinand de Lasteyrie (née Martha Washington Seabrook) on 30 May 1846
- Countess Konstantin von Buxhoeveden (née Caroline McKnight) in 1847
- Mary Cunard, Lady Cunard (née Mary Bache McEvers) in May 1849
- Mary Blanc, Baroness Blanc (née Mary Elizabeth Gebhard) on 29 April 1852
- Sally Hay, Lady Hay (née Sarah "Sally" Duncan) in August 1853
- Baroness Bernhard von Beust (née Sidonie Peters) in 1853
- Baroness August von Wächter-Lautenbach (née Josephine Lee, elder sister of Mary Esther Lee) on 19 December 1855
- Mary Dubois, Viscountess de Courval (née Mary Ray) on 2 July 1856
- Baroness Ancelis de Vaugrigneuse (née Sarah Morris Stout) on 7 October 1857
- Mary Fairfax, Lady Fairfax of Cameron (née Mary Brown Kirby) on 8 October 1857
- Emily de Ganay, Marquise de Ganay (née Emily Ridgway) on 8 March 1858
- Baroness Theodorus van Limburg (née Isabella "Belle" Cass) on 23 August 1858
- Florence Eardley, Lady Eardley (née Emily Florence Magee) on 12 December 1859
- Adele de Portes de Pardailhan, Marquise de Portes (née Adele Gordon Hutton) on 19 April 1860
- Baroness Ernst Bruno von Gersdorff (née Caroline Choate) on 6 December 1860
- Countess Harald Theodor Karl Gregor Moltke-Hvitfeldt (née Anne "Annie" Hutton) in 1860
- Helen Murray, Lady Murray (née Helen Cornelia Sanger) on 7 May 1861
- Countess Paul de Cadoine de Gabriac (née Florence Phalen) on 23 May 1861
- Eliza Gavotti Verospi, Marquise Gavotti Verospi (née Eliza "Lizzie" Davis, younger sister of Mathilde "Tilly" Davis) on 10 October 1861
- Princess Felix of Salm-Salm (née Agnes Elisabeth Winona Leclerc Joy) on 30 August 1862
- Countess Paul von Hatzfeldt zu Wildenburg (née Helene Moulton) on 4 November 1863
- Helen Scarlett, Baroness Abinger (née Helen Magruder) on 23 December 1863
- Matilda Burnett, Lady Burnett (née Matilda Josephine Murphy) on 23 May 1864
- Mathilde d'Erlanger, Baroness d'Erlanger (née Marguerite Mathilde Slidell) on 3 October 1864
- Princess Frederick of Schleswig-Holstein-Sonderburg-Augustenburg, Princess of Noer (née Mary Esther Lee) on 3 November 1864, later Countess Alfred von Waldersee on 14 April 1874
- Countess Carl Gustaf von Rosen (née Ella Carlton Moore) on 10 November 1864

== From 1865 to 1965 ==
After the beginning of the Reconstruction Era and the Gilded Age (at the end of the American Civil War on 9 May 1865):

- The Hon. Mrs Ralph Harbord (née Elizabeth Pole Schenley) on 5 September 1865
- Mary Virginia de Giverville, Countess of Giverville (née Mary Virginia Kingsbury) on 26 October 1865
- Countess Charles-Aimery de Narbonne-Lara (née Catherine "Kate" Phalen) on 11 January 1866
- Mathilde Lante Montefeltro della Rovere, Duchess di Bomarzo and Princess di Belmonte (née Mathilde "Tilly" Davis) on 28 April 1866
- Elizabeth de Talleyrand-Périgord, Marquise de Talleyrand (née Elizabeth "Bessie" Beers-Curtis) on 18 March 1867
- Anna Perrelli Tomacelli Filomarino, Princess di Boiano and Duchess di Monasterace (née Nina "Anna" Christina Haight) on 30 April 1868
- Melissa Reade, Lady Reade (née Melissa Ray) on 4 June 1868
- Elise, Countess of Edla (née Elise "Elisa" Friedericke Hensler) on 10 June 1869
- Jenny de Pourtalès, Countess de Pourtalès-Gorgier (née Jenny Lind Holladay) on 6 December 1869
- Mary Elizabeth Brancaccio, Princess Brancaccio, Princess di Triggiano and Duchess di Lustra (née Mary Elizabeth Hickson Field) on 3 March 1870
- Romaine, Baroness von Overbeck (née Romaine Madeleine Vinton Goddard) on 16 March 1870
- Countess Maximilian Ernst Maria Esterházy zu Galántha und Forchtenstein (née Sarah Virginia Carroll, previously Griffin) on 6 June 1870
- Eleanor Cenci, Princess di Vicovaro (née Eleanor Spencer) on 25 June 1870
- Princess Alexander zu Lynar (née May Amelia Parsons) on 10 May 1871
- Countess Alfons de Diesbach (née Meta McCall) on 19 September 1871
- Juliet Carington, Lady Carington (née Juliet Warden) on 23 September 1871
- The Hon. Mrs Henry Wodehouse on 25 June 1872, then Mary Paget, Marchioness of Anglesey and Countess of Uxbridge on 26 June 1880 (née Mary "Minna" Livingstone King)
- Marie de Grasse Evans, Lady Evans (née Marie de Grasse Stevens, previously Van Wart) on 31 July 1872
- Constance Gianotti, Countess Gianotti (née Constance Elizabeth Kinney) on 21 August 1872
- Marie Rosine de Serre, Countess de Saint-Roman (née Marie Rosine Slidell) on 30 September 1872
- Countess Hans Lothar von Schweinitz (née Anna Jay) on 18 October 1872
- Baroness Frédéric Grand d'Hauteville (née Susan Watts Macomb) in 1872
- Baroness Henri Renouard de Bussière (née Pauline Calvert "Cassandra" Holladay) in 1872
- Baroness Adolph von Roques (née Caroline Holbrook, previously Du Barry) in 1872
- Augusta Pellew, Viscountess Exmouth (née Augusta Jay) on 14 May 1873
- Nora Blanc de Lanautte, Viscountess d'Hauterive (née Nora Davis, younger sister of Mathilde and Eliza Davis) on 15 October 1873
- Lady Randolph Spencer-Churchill (née Jennie Jerome, aka the first American dollar princess) on 15 April 1874
- Eliza Graham, Lady Graham of Esk (née Elizabeth "Eliza" Jane Burns) on 1 August 1874
- Baroness Carl Nils Daniel de Bildt (née Lilian Augusta "Angelika" Stuart Moore) on 30 September 1874
- Mary Elizabeth de Choiseul-Praslin, Duchess de Praslin (née Mary Elizabeth "Nellie" Forbes) on 17 December 1874
- Marquise Simone Peruzzi de' Medici (née Edith Marion Story) on 9 February 1875
- Alice Chapelle de Jumilhac, Duchess de Richelieu on 27 February 1875, then The Princess of Monaco on 30 October 1889 (née Alice Heine)
- Sarita Le Peletier, Countess d'Aunay (née Sarita Kimball Berdan) on 3 March 1875
- Margaret, Lady de Stuers on 20 April 1875, then Countess Eliot Zborowski, Countess de Montsaulnin (Note: The comital title of Eliot Zborowski and the title "Count de Montsaulnin" are considered doubtful although tolerated in society.) on 7 March 1892 (née Margaret Laura Astor Carey)
- Jane Molesworth, Lady Molesworth (née Jane Graham Frost) on 3 June 1875
- Marie de Pourtalès, Countess de Pourtalès-Gorgier (née Mary Sarah Amelia Boozer, previously Beecher) on 4 November 1875
- Countess Maurice Sala (née Emily "Emilie" Sanford) in 1875
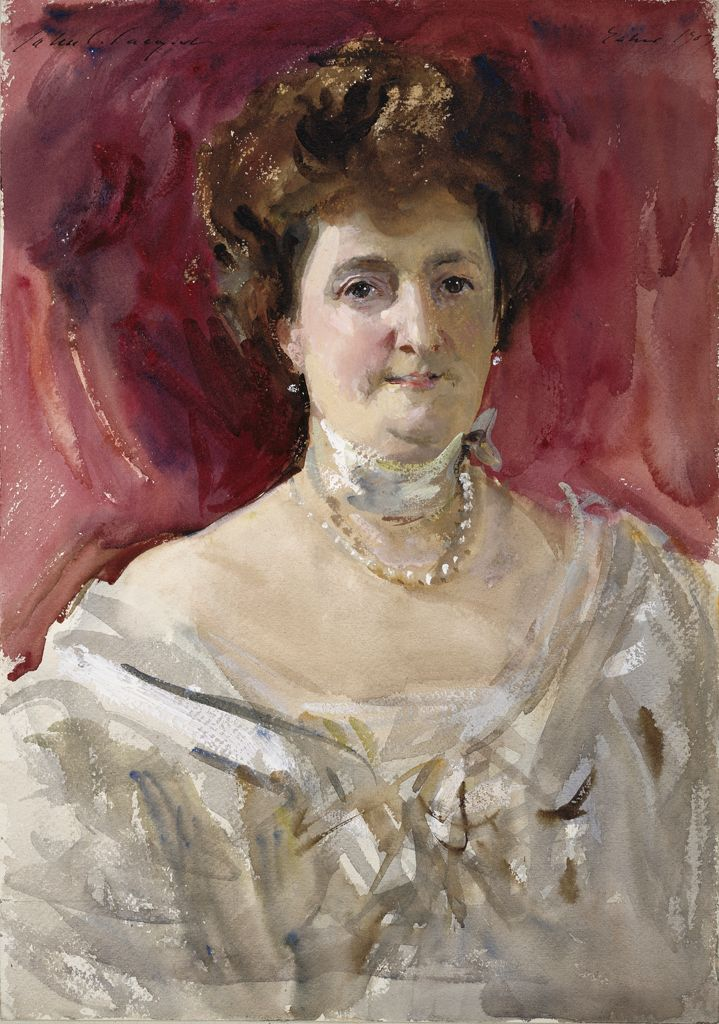
- Consuelo Montagu, Duchess of Manchester (née María Francisca de la Consolación "Consuelo" Yznaga)
  Consuelo Montagu, Duchess of Manchester (née María Francisca de la Consolación "Consuelo" Yznaga) on 22 May 1876
- Elizabeth Harcourt, Lady Harcourt (née Elizabeth Cabot Motley, previously Ives) on 2 December 1876
- Countess Eberhard von Linden (née Isabella Andrews) on 2 December 1876
- The Hon. Mrs Thomas George Grosvenor (née Sophia Williams) on 24 April 1877
- Marquise Manfredi Lanza di Mercato Bianco (née Clara Hammond, aka Clara Lanza) on 10 May 1877
- Countess Goffredo Guglielmo Galli (née Clara Roberts) on 9 June 1877
- Caroline Caldeira Leitão Pinto de Albuquerque, Countess da Borralha (née Caroline Hildegarde Orne) on 12 September 1877
- Antoinette Charette de La Contrie, Baroness de Charette (née Antoinette Van Leer Polk) on 1 December 1877
- Mary Paget, Lady Paget (née Mary "Minnie" Fiske Stevens) on 27 July 1878
- Edith Playfair, Baroness Playfair [1892] (née Edith Russell) on 3 October 1878
- The Hon. Mrs Octavius Henry Lambart (née Hannah Sarah Howard) on 15 October 1878
- Isabella Eugénie Reubsaet, Duchess di Camposelice [1881] (née Isabella Eugénie Boyer, previously Singer) on 8 January 1879
- Ada Telfener, Countess Telfener (née Ada Hungerford) on 15 March 1879
- Mary Cary, Viscountess Falkland (née Mary Reade) on 25 September 1879
- Katharine Norton, Baroness Grantley (née Katharine Buckner McVickar, previously Norton) on 5 November 1879
- Laura d'Avenel, Viscountess d'Avenel (née Laura Jane Delancey Meinell) in April 1880
- Ellen Magawly Cerati, Countess Magawly di Calry (née Ellen Falkenburg Abbott) on 12 August 1880
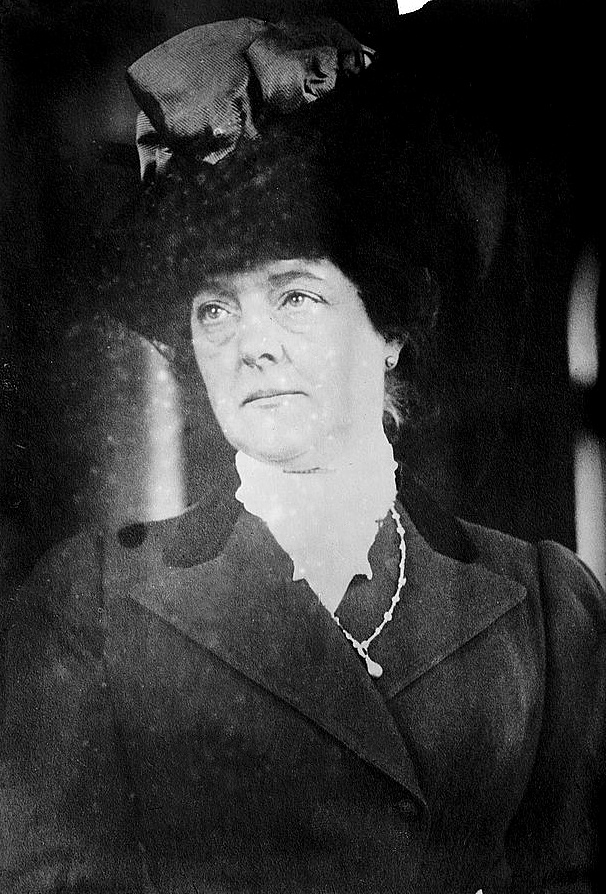
- Frances Roche, the Hon. Mrs James Roche (née Frances Ellen Work)
  The Hon. Mrs James Roche (née Frances Ellen Work) on 22 September 1880
- Maria Anna Lobo da Silveira, Marquise de Alvito and Countess de Oriola (née Maria Anna Christ, previously Berna) on 18 December 1880
- Florence Fermor-Hesketh, Lady Fermor-Hesketh (née Florence Emily Sharon) on 22 December 1880
- Natica Lister-Kaye, Lady Lister-Kaye (née María de la Natividad "Natica" Yznaga) on 5 December 1881
- Kate Perceval, Countess of Egmont (née Kate Howell) in 1881
- Medora Manca-Amat de Vallombrosa, Marquise de Morès et de Montemaggiore (née Medora Marie von Hoffmann) on 15 February 1882
- Margaret Waterlow, Lady Waterlow (née Margaret Hamilton) on 28 March 1882
- Baroness Edmund Wucherer von Huldenfeld (née Margaret Plater Price) on 20 July 1882
- Baroness Gábor Bornemisza de Kászon et Impérfalva (née Mathilde Louise Price) on 16 May 1883
- The Hon. Mrs Hugh Oliver Northcote (née Edith Fish) on 6 June 1883
- Anita Wolseley, Lady Wolseley (née Anita Theresa Murphy) on 17 July 1883
- Julia Paget, Lady Paget (née Julia Norrie Moke) on 19 July 1883
- Leonie Leslie, Lady Leslie (née Leonie Blanche Jerome) on 2 October 1884
- The Hon. Mrs Charles Maule Ramsay (née Martha Estelle Garrison) on 28 May 1885
- Josephine Ruspoli, Princess di Poggio Suasa (née Josephine Mary Beers-Curtis) on 18 June 1885
- Daisy Balluet d'Estournelles de Constant, Baroness de Constant de Rebecque (née Margaret "Daisy" Sedgwick Berend) on 25 June 1885
- Frances Venables-Vernon, Baroness Vernon (née Frances Margaret Lawrance) on 14 July 1885
- Tennessee Cook, Lady Cook and Viscountess de Monserrate (née Tennessee Celeste Claflin) on 15 October 1885
- Marquise Carlo Vetti Torrigiani (née Nancy McClellan Fry) in 1885
- Norma de Suarez d'Aulan, Marquise d'Aulan (née Norma Christmas) on 17 March 1886
- Baroness Louis de La Grange (née Anita Maria Carroll) on 14 October 1886
- Countess Jean de Kergorlay (née Mary Louisa Carroll) on 3 December 1886
- The Hon. Mrs Walter Yarde-Buller (née Leilah Kirkham, previously Blair) in 1886
- Adele de Talleyrand-Périgord, Duchess of Dino (née Adele Livingston Sampson, previously Stevens) on 25 January 1887
- Ellen Butler, Marchioness of Ormonde (née Ellen Sprague Stager) on 8 March 1887
- Princess Louis de Scey-Montbéliard on 27 July 1887, then Princess Edmond de Polignac on 15 December 1893 (née Winnaretta Eugenie Singer)
- Countess Detalmo Savorgnan di Brazzà (née Cora Ann Slocomb) on 18 October 1887
- Baroness Ludovic Moncheur (née Mary Daisy Holman) on 26 October 1887
- Laura Haldane-Duncan, Countess of Camperdown (née Laura Dove, previously Blanchard) on 4 February 1888
- Marquise Paolo d'Adda Salvaterra on 7 February 1888, then Countess Horace de Choiseul-Praslin on 25 May 1906 (née Mary Hooper)
- Isabelle-Blanche Decazes de Glücksbierg, Duchess Decazes and Duchess af Glücksbierg (née Isabelle Blanche Singer) on 28 April 1888
- Louisa Walpole, Countess of Orford (née Louisa Melissa Corbin) on 17 May 1888
- Lily Spencer-Churchill, Duchess of Marlborough on 29 June 1888, then Lady William Beresford on 30 April 1895 (née Jane Lilian "Lily" Warren Price, previously Hamersley)
- Leila Herbert, Lady Herbert (née Leila "Belle" Wilson) on 27 November 1888
- Helen Duncan, Lady Duncan (née Helen Julia Pfizer) in 1888
- Baroness Barthold von Hoyningen-Huene (née Emily Anne "Nan" Lothrop) in 1888
- Doña María Luisa La Farge Binsse de Saint-Victor de Ágreda May, Countess de Casa de Ágreda (née Marie Louise La Farge, previously Lorillard, aka Countess de Agreda) on 4 February 1889
- Elizabeth Smith-Barry, Baroness Barrymore (née Elizabeth Wadsworth, previously Post) on 28 February 1889
- Jeanie Naylor-Leyland, Lady Naylor-Leyland (née Jeanie Willson Chamberlain) on 14 September 1889
- Princess Franz von Hatzfeldt zu Wildenburg (née Clara Elizabeth Prentice-Huntington) on 28 October 1889
- Caroline Fitzmaurice, Baroness Fitzmaurice (née Caroline Fitzgerald) on 23 November 1889
- Sarah, Baroness Halkett (née Sarah Maria Phelps Stokes) on 11 February 1890
- Countess Maximilian Albrecht zu Pappenheim (née Mary Wister Wheeler) on 29 April 1890
- Josephine Boyle, Countess of Cork and Orrery (née Josephine Catherine Hale) on 30 April 1890
- Clara de Riquet, Princess de Caraman-Chimay (née Clara Ward) on 19 May 1890
- Baroness Moritz Curt von Zedtwitz (née Mary Elizabeth "Lina" Breckinridge Caldwell) in June 1890
- Nina McGrigor, Lady McGrigor (née Nina Meiggs) on 30 October 1890
- Countess Charles de Galliffet on 15 November 1890, then Countess Maurice des Monstiers de Mérinville on 28 July 1914 (née Frances Stevens)
- Helene Leigh, Baroness Leigh (née Frances Helene Forbes Beckwith) on 29 November 1890
- Princess Friedrich Wilhelm von Ardeck, Princess von Ardeck on 17 December 1890, then Baroness József Döry de Jobaháza on 4 February 1904 (née Anne Hollingsworth Price)
- Marcelite Le Tonnelier, Marquise de Breteuil (née Marcelite "Lita" Garner) on 3 March 1891
- Countess Hermann Alexander de Pourtalès (née Helen "Hélène" Barbey) on 25 April 1891
- Caroline Lagergren, Marquise Lagergren (née Caroline Alice Russell) on 6 May 1891
- Florence Gordon-Cumming, Lady Gordon-Cumming (née Florence Josephine Garner) on 10 June 1891
- Countess Ferdinand Blücher von Wahlstatt (née Alma Loeb) on 19 July 1891
- Mary Gough-Calthorpe, Baroness Calthorpe (née Mary Burrows) on 22 July 1891
- Baroness Maximilian von Berg (née Sallie Mae Price) on 22 October 1891
- Countess Micislas Orlowski (née Mabel Ledyard Stevens) on 28 December 1891
- Emma Seillière, Baroness Seillière (née Emma Riley, previously Livermore) on 22 April 1892
- Countess Johannes von Francken-Sierstorpff (née Mary Carpenter Knowlton) on 27 April 1892
- The Hon. Mrs Francis Anson (née Caroline Cleveland) on 15 June 1892
- Elizabeth Eaton, Baroness Cheylesmore (née Elizabeth Richardson French) on 14 July 1892
- Amy Home-Speirs, Lady Home (née Amy Eliza Green) on 30 August 1892
- Antoinette Vanden-Bempde-Johnstone, Lady Vanden-Bempde-Johnstone (née Antoinette Pinchot) on 21 December 1892
- Mary Caroline Grey-Egerton, Lady Grey-Egerton (née Mary Caroline "May" Campbell Cuyler) on 4 January 1893
- Cornelia Craven, Countess of Craven (née Cornelia Martin) on 18 April 1893
- Flora Hamilton-Temple-Blackwood, Marchioness of Dufferin and Ava on 16 October 1893, then Flora Curzon, Countess Howe in December 1919 (née Florence "Flora" Hamilton Davis)
- Adele Capell, Countess of Essex (née Adele Beach Grant) on 14 December 1893
- Countess Henri de Laugier-Villars (née Carola Silvie Livingston) on 24 January 1894
- Virginia Coventry, Viscountess Deerhurst (née Virginia Lee Daniel, aka Virginia Bonynge) on 10 March 1894
- Countess Georg Erdődy de Monyorókerék et Monoszló (née Julia Scott) on 30 April 1894
- Elizabeth Poniatowski, Princess Poniatowski, Princess di Monte Rotondo (née Elizabeth Helen Sperry) on 6 October 1894
- Princess Sergei Belosselsky-Belozersky (née Susan Tucker Whittier) on 23 October 1894
- Lady Francis Pelham-Clinton-Hope (née Mary Augusta "May" Yohé, aka the first American stage princess) on 27 November 1894
- The Hon. Mrs Bertrand Russell (née Alys Whitall Pearsall Smith) on 13 December 1894
- Countess Boni de Castellane on 4 March 1895, then Anna de Talleyrand-Périgord, Duchess de Sagan on 7 July 1908 (née Anna Gould)
- Maud Cunard, Lady Cunard (née Maud Alice Burke) on 18 April 1895
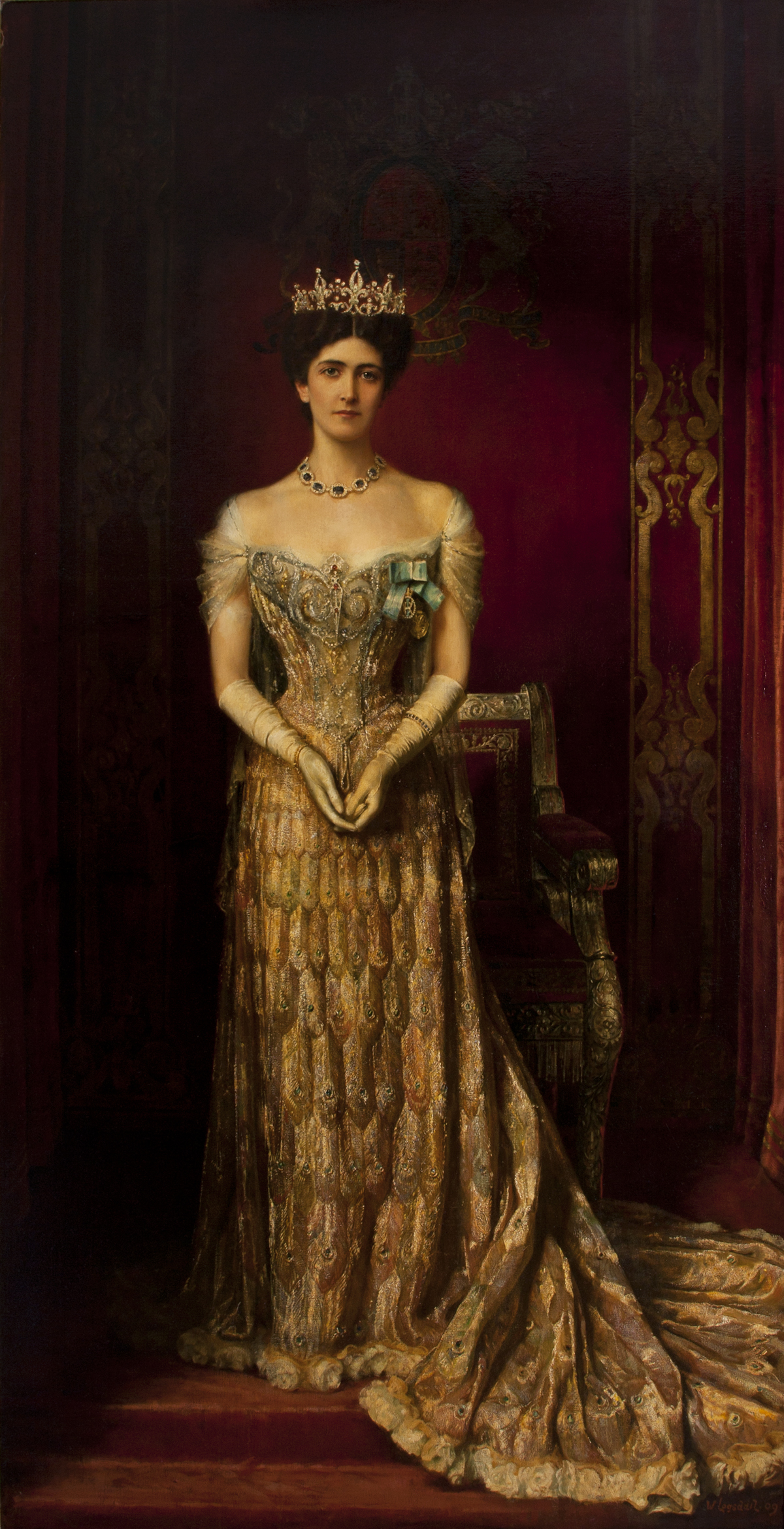
- Mary Curzon, Baroness Curzon of Kedleston and Vicereine of India (née Mary Victoria Leiter)
  Mary Curzon, Marchioness Curzon of Kedleston, Vicereine of India (née Mary Victoria Leiter) on 22 April 1895
- Lady Sholto George Douglas (née Loretta Mooney, aka Loretta Addis) on 31 May 1895
- Leonora Bennet, Countess of Tankerville (née Leonora Sophia Van Marter) on 23 October 1895
- Countess Maximilien de Foras (née Marie Delphine Meredith Read) on 5 November 1895
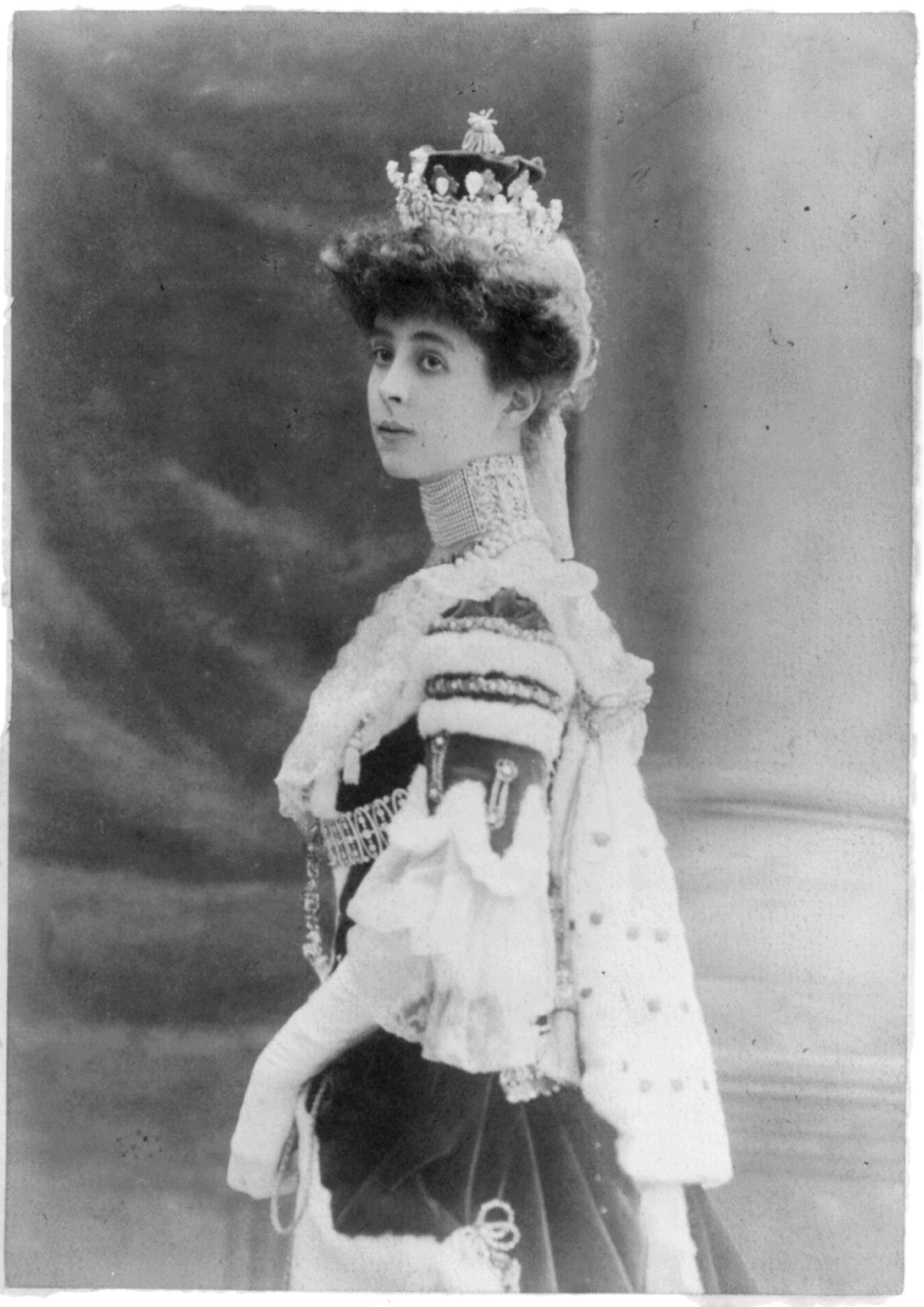
- Consuelo Spencer-Churchill, Duchess of Marborough (née Consuelo Vanderbilt)
  Consuelo Spencer-Churchill, Duchess of Marlborough (née Consuelo Vanderbilt) on 6 November 1895
- Cara Broughton, Baroness Fairhaven (née Cara Leland Rogers, previously Duff) on 12 November 1895
- Margaret Pineton de Chambrun, Marquise de Chambrun (née Margaret Rives Nichols) on 12 December 1895
- Countess Béla Mária Rudolf Zichy de Zich et Vásonkeő (née Mabel Elizabeth Wright, previously Yznaga) on 26 December 1895
- Amy Parker, Lady Parker [1902] (née Amy VanTine) in December 1895
- Princess Pierre Troubetzkoy (née Amélie Louise Rives, previously Chanler) on 18 February 1896
- Countess Conrad de Buisseret Steenbecque de Blarenghien (née Caroline Sherman Story) on 17 August 1896
- Mary Gwendolin des Montiers-Mérinville, Marquise des Monstiers-Mérinville (née Mary Gwendolin "Mamie" Byrd Caldwell) on 19 October 1896
- Countess Rechid Bey Czaykowski on 7 January 1897, then Edith de Tardieu de Maleissye, Marquise de Maleissye (née Edith Lyman Collins) on 11 July 1911
- Viscountess Léon Frédéric de Janzé (née Marguerite "Moya" Hennessy) on 11 January 1897
- Baroness Clemens August von Ketteler (née Matilda "Maud" Cass Ledyard) on 24 February 1897
- Countess Manfred von Matuschka (née Helen "Ella" Holbrook Walker) on 16 June 1897, then Princess della Torre e Tasso and Duchess of Castel Duino (previously Hyde) in May 1932
- Fanny de Cadoine de Gabriac, Marquise de Gabriac (née Fanny Ludlow Fithian) on 28 October 1897
- Baroness Friedrich Karl August von Hutten zum Stolzenberg (née Elizabeth "Bettina" Riddle) in 1897
- Cora Byng, Countess of Strafford (née Cora Smith, previously Colgate) on 6 December 1898
- Baroness Adolf Johann von Brüning (née Marion "Maria" Hubbard Treat, previously McKay, aka Countess Maria von Bruening) on 18 April 1899
- Princess Franz Seraph Maria Joseph Nepomuk von Auersperg (née Florence Elsworth Hazard) on 14 June 1899
- Mary Harcourt, Viscountess Harcourt (née Mary Ethel Burns) on 1 July 1899
- Princess Mikhail Cantacuzène, Countess Speransky (née Julia Dent Grant) on 24 September 1899
- Pauline, Baroness von Bush (née Clara Pauline Joran, aka Baroness de Bush) on 6 December 1899
- Ruth Lee, Baroness Lee of Fareham [1918] then Viscountess Lee of Fareham [1922] (née Ruth Moore) on 23 December 1899
- Viscountess Romain d'Osmoy (née Susan LeRoy Dresser) in 1899
- The Hon. Mrs Charles John Coventry (née Lily Whitehouse) on 16 January 1900
- Marian Hottinguer, Baroness Hottinguer (née Marian Hall Munroe) on 23 January 1900
- The Hon. Mrs Archibald Lionel Lindesay-Bethune (née Ethel Tucker) on 31 January 1900
- Edith Vessicchio, Countess di Castelmenardo (née Edith Marie Van Buren, aka Countess de Castelmenardo) on 7 July 1900
- Baroness Ruprecht Böcklin von Böcklinsau (née Gertrude Berwind) on 15 October 1900
- Helena Montagu, Duchess of Manchester on 14 November 1900, then Helena Keith-Falconer, Countess of Kintore on 23 November 1937 (née Helena Zimmerman)
- Countess Otto Grote (née Alice Van Bergen) on 16 November 1900
- Gertrude Forbes-Robertson, Lady Forbes-Robertson [1913] (née May Gertrude Dermot, aka Gertrude Elliott) in 1900
- Countess Aldebert de Chambrun (née Clara Eleanor Longworth) on 19 February 1901
- Princess Enrico Ruspoli (née Jennie "Eugenia" Enfield Berry, previously Bruton) on 2 March 1901
- Ethel Beatty, Countess Beatty [1919] (née Ethel Newcomb Field, previously Tree) on 22 May 1901
- The Hon. Mrs William Arthur de la Poer Horsley-Beresford (née Florence Miller) on 17 June 1901
- Countess Franz-Joseph Larisch von Moennich (née Mary "Marie" Satterfield) on 27 June 1901
- Maria Rospigliosi, Princess Rospigliosi and Duchess di Zagarolo (née Marie "Maria" Jennings Reid, previously Parkhurst) on 26 August 1901
- Countess Boson de Talleyrand-Périgord, Duchess de Valençay (Note: The title "Duke de Valençay" is one of the titles of the Duke of Talleyrand, but assumed by his younger son Count Boson de Talleyrand-Périgord before he inherits it (in 1937, after his divorce from Helen S. Morton), a pretension tolerated in society.) (née Helen Stuyvesant Morton) on 5 October 1901
- Princess Jean Ghika (née Hazel Marie Singer) on 19 December 1901
- Elena Hely-Hutchinson, Countess of Donoughmore (née Elena Maria Grace) on 21 December 1901
- Patricia Lockhart-Ross, Lady Lockhart-Ross (née Patricia Burnley Ellison) in 1901
- Baroness Ludovic Moncheur (née Charlotte "Carlota" Clayton) on 15 January 1902
- Wilhelmina Burrell, Lady Burrell (née Wilhelmina Louisa Winans) on 11 February 1902
- Countess Hugo von und zu Lerchenfeld auf Köfering und Schönberg (née Ethel Louise Wyman) on 24 September 1902
- Countess Paul Raoul de Sauvan d'Aramon (née Henrietta "Rita" Bell) on 24 September 1902
- The Hon. Mrs Walter Patrick Lindsay (née Ruth Henderson) on 26 November 1902
- The Hon. Mrs Cecil Baring (née Maude Louise Lorillard, previously Tailer) in November 1902
- Baroness André Poupart de Neuflize (née Eveline "Eva" Barbey) on 10 February 1903
- Alice Seymour, Countess of Yarmouth (née Alice Cornelia Thaw) on 27 April 1903
- Princess Giambattista Rospigliosi (née Julia Ethel Bronson) on 16 May 1903
- Harriet della Gherardesca, Countess della Gherardesca (née Harriet Richmond Taylor) on 20 May 1903
- Romaine Monson, Baroness Monson (née Romaine Stone, previously Turnure) on 1 July 1903
- Baroness Constantin Johan Edvard Axel Ramsay (née Frances Whitehouse) on 7 July 1903
- Lilian Bagot, Baroness Bagot (née Lilian Marie May) on 25 July 1903
- Mary Innes-Ker, Duchess of Roxburghe (née Mary "May" Goelet) on 10 November 1903
- Countess Riccardo Fabbricotti (née Cornelia Roosevelt Scovel) on 25 November 1903
- Countess Odon de Lubersac (née Constance Livermore, aka Constance Livermore-Seillière) on 26 January 1904
- Countess Alexander von Beroldingen (née Margot Marie Stone) on 3 February 1904
- Countess Josef Gizycki (née Eleanor Josephine Medill "Cissy" Patterson) on 14 April 1904
- Countess Louis de Gontaut-Biron (née Martha "Marthe" Leishman) on 27 June 1904
- Countess Gaston de Breteuil (née Edythe Scott Grant) on 18 July 1904
- Marion Bateman-Hanbury, Baroness Bateman (née Marion Alice Graham, previously Knapp) on 23 July 1904
- Baroness Reinhart Bachofen von Echt (née Alice Pfizer) on 5 September 1904
- Countess Camille de Borchgrave d'Altena (née Ruth Reilly Snyder) on 22 September 1904
- Edith Dusmet de Smours, Marquise Dusmet de Smours (née Edith Oliver) on 22 October 1904
- Margaret Howard, Countess of Suffolk (née Margaret "Daisy" Hyde Leiter) on 26 December 1904
- Alice Lowther, Lady Lowther (née Alice Blight) on 28 February 1905
- Anna St Clair-Erskine, Countess of Rosslyn (née Anna Robinson) on 21 March 1905
- Beatrice de Galard de Béarn, Princess de Béarn et de Chalais (née Beatrice Winans) on 24 June 1905
- The Hon. Mrs Frederick Edward Guest (née Amy Phipps) on 28 June 1905
- The Hon. Mrs Lionel George William Guest (née Flora Bigelow, previously Dodge) on 6 July 1905
- Alberta Montagu, Countess of Sandwich (née Alberta Sturges) on 25 July 1905
- The Hon. Mrs Alexander FitzRoy St Clair-Erskine (née Winifrede Baker) on 28 October 1905
- Countess Carl von Holnstein aus Bayern (née Mildred Harrison) on 16 November 1905
- Eloise Heathcote-Drummond-Willoughby, Countess of Ancaster (née Eloise Lawrence Breese) on 6 December 1905
- Frances Baring, Baroness Ashburton (née Frances Donnelly, aka Frances Belmont) on 19 February 1906
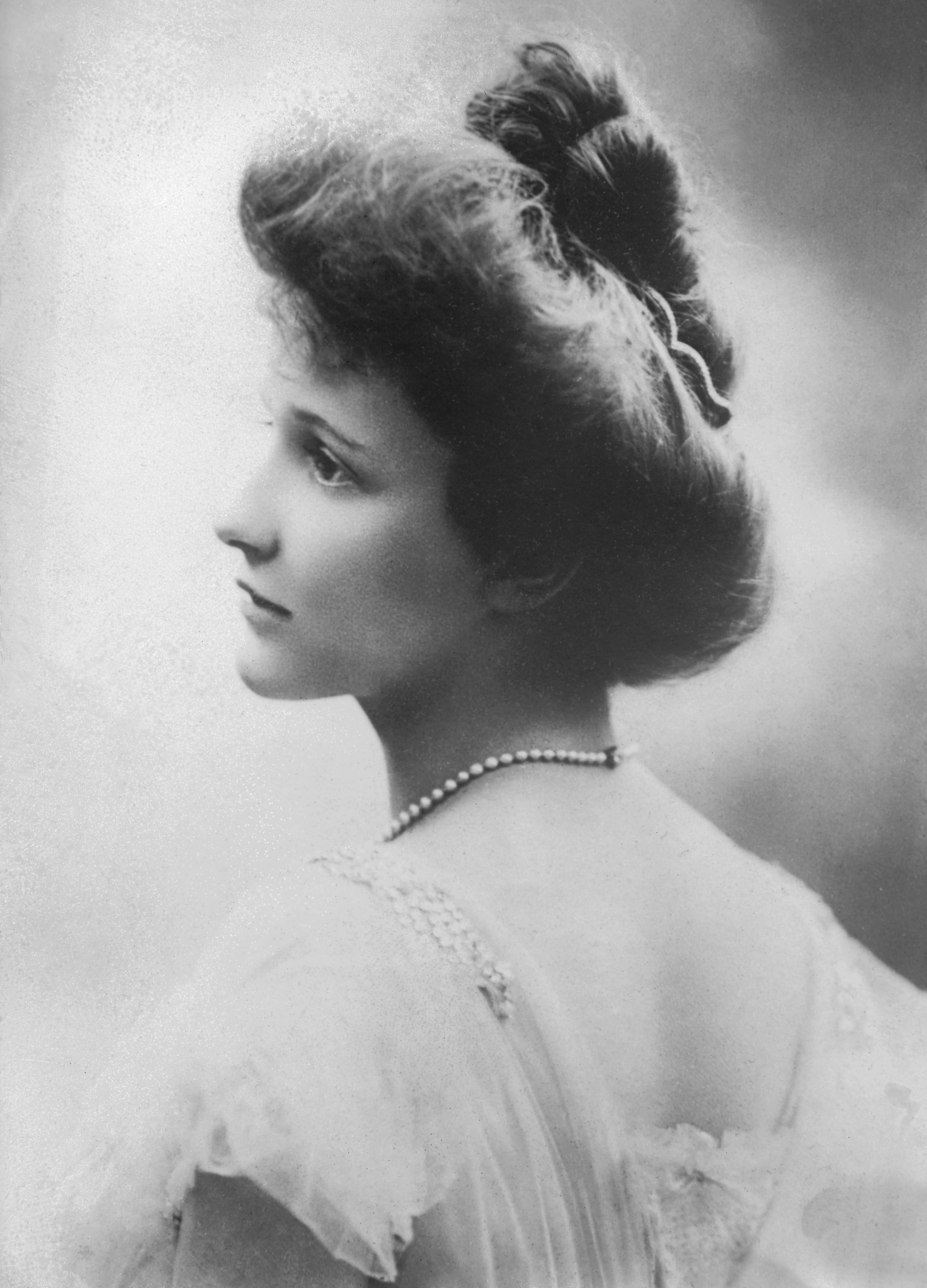
- Nancy Astor, Viscountess Astor (née Nancy Witcher Langhorne)
  Nancy Astor, Viscountess Astor (née Nancy Witcher Langhorne, previously Shaw) on 3 May 1906
- The Hon. Mrs Lionel John Olive Lambart (née Adelaide Douglas Randolph) on 8 May 1906
- Mary Falle, Baroness Portsea (née Mary Greene Hubbard Sturgis, previously Seymour) on 18 July 1906
- Isabella Geddes, Baroness Geddes [1942] (née Isabella Gamble Ross) on 8 September 1906
- Clara Green-Price, Lady Green-Price (née Clara Lucile Potter) on 24 November 1906
- The Hon. Mrs Murrough O'Brien (née Marguerite Lewis) on 21 November 1906
- Hermione Law, Baroness Ellenborough (née Hermione Octavia Croghan Schenley) on 19 December 1906
- Madeleine d'Andigné, Marquise d'Andigné (née Madeleine Ives Goddard) on 29 December 1906
- Winnifreda Dawson-Damer, Countess of Portarlington (née Winnifreda Yuill) on 2 February 1907
- Countess Carl Poul Oscar Moltke (née Cornelia Van Rensselaer Thayer) on 29 June 1907
- Baroness Maximilian Konrad von Romberg (née Antoinette MacDonough Converse) in July 1907
- Mary Elsie Torlonia, Princess di Civitella-Cesi (née Mary Elsie Moore) on 15 August 1907
- Lady Alastair Robert Innes-Ker (née Anne Breese) on 10 October 1907
- Amy Harrington, Lady Harrington (née Amy McMillan) on 13 October 1907
- The Hon. Mrs Henry Thomas Coventry (née Edith Kip, previously McCreery) on 3 December 1907
- Baroness Leo de Graffenried (née Irma Stern) on 10 December 1907
- Countess László Széchenyi de Sárvár-Felsővidék (née Gladys Moore Vanderbilt) on 27 January 1908
- Florence Grosvenor, Baroness Ebury (née Florence Padelford) on 1 February 1908
- Theodora d'Albert, Duchess of Chaulnes (née Theodora Mary Shonts) on 16 February 1908
- Countess Rudolph Festetics de Tolna (née Alice Ney Wetherbee) on 24 February 1908
- Baroness Johann Friedrich von Hiller (née Emily Bronaugh Barney) on 6 June 1908
- Jean Ward, Lady Ward (née Jean Templeton Reid) on 23 June 1908
- Elizabeth de Queirós de Almeida e Vasconcelos, Countess de Santa Eulalia (née Sarah Elizabeth Shindler, previously Stetson) on 23 July 1908
- Baroness Rulekin Maximilian von Kleist (née Edith Berwind) on 21 October 1908
- Baroness Curt Loeffelholz von Colberg (née Ione "Iona" Wilhelmina Sutton Pickhardt, previously Shope) in 1908
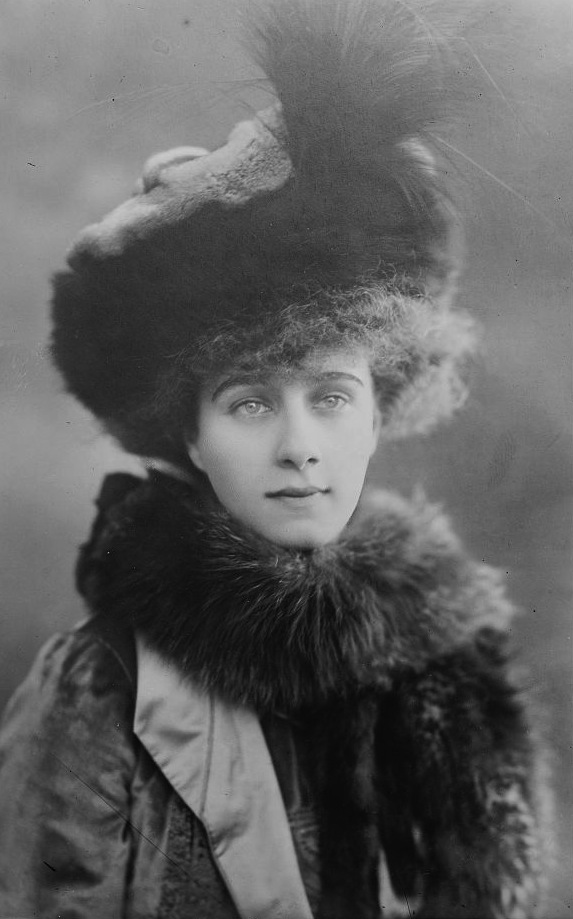
- Beatrice Forbes, Countess of Granard (née Jane Beatrice Mills)
  Beatrice Forbes, Countess of Granard (née Beatrice Mills) on 14 January 1909
- Countess Hermann von Seherr-Thoss (née Margaret Muriel White) on 29 April 1909
- Josephine del Drago dei Principi del Drago, Marquise di Riofreddo (née Josephine Kleiner, previously Schmid, aka Princess del Drago) on 22 May 1909
- Beatrice Theodoli, Marquise Theodoli di San Vito (née Beatrice Thaw) on 4 June 1909
- Hazel Lavery, Lady Lavery [1918] (née Hazel Martyn, previously Trudeau) on 21 July 1909
- Florence Fermor-Hesketh, Baroness Hesketh (née Florence Louise Breckinridge) on 9 September 1909
- Princess Miguel of Braganza (née Anita Rhinelander Stewart) on 15 September 1909
- Susanne Charette de La Contrie, Marquise de Charette and Baroness de La Contrie (née Susanne Henning) on 11 November 1909
- Olive Greville, Baroness Greville (née Olive Grace, previously Kerr) on 24 November 1909
- Irene, Viscountess de Beughem de Houtem (née Irone "Irene" Hare) on 5 December 1909
- Ellen Hood, Lady Hood (née Ellen Touzalin, previously Nickerson) on 19 January 1910
- Countess Antal Sigray (née Harriot Holmes "Hattie" Daly) on 29 March 1910
- Baroness Ferdinand Carl von Stumm (née Constance Hoyt) on 30 March 1910
- Margaretta Finch-Hatton, Countess of Winchilsea and Nottingham (née Margaretta Armstrong Drexel) on 8 June 1910
- Mildred Acheson, Countess of Gosford (née Caroline Mildred Carter) on 21 June 1910
- Helen Eliot, Countess of St Germans (née Helen Agnes Post) on 22 June 1910
- Princess Albrecht Radziwiłł on 5 July 1910, then Countess Paul Pálffy ab Erdöd on 15 January 1922 (née Dorothy Evelyn "Dolly" Deacon)
- Countess Pierre-Joseph de Salviac de Viel-Castel (née Annah Dillon Ripley) on 15 October 1910
- Jane Vavasseur Fisher, Baroness Fisher (née Jane Morgan) on 22 November 1910
- Lucie de Choiseul-Praslin, Duchess de Praslin (née Lucie Marie Tate, previously Paine) on 28 November 1910
- Alys Bingham, Lady Bingham (née Alys Elizabeth Carr, previously Chauncey) on 3 February 1911
- Helen Beresford, Baroness Decies (née Vivian Gould, aka Helen Vivien Gould) on 7 February 1911
- Lady George Hugo Cholmondeley (née Clara Elizabeth Taylor, previously Stirling) on 7 March 1911

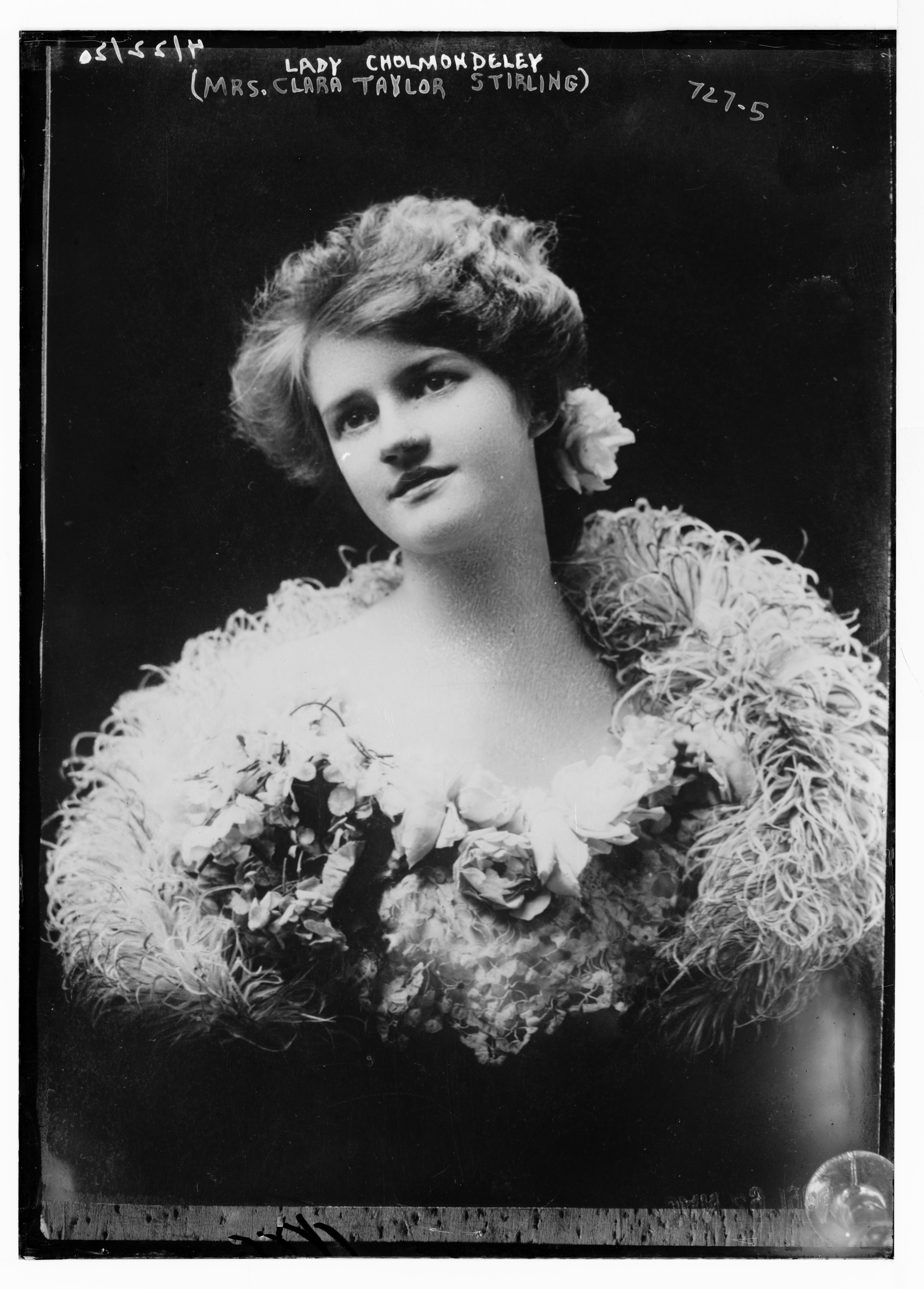
Lady George Hugo Cholmondeley (née Clara Elizabeth Taylor, previously Stirling)

- Duchess Henry Borwin zu Mecklenburg (née Elizabeth Tibbits Pratt, previously De Gasquet-James) on 15 June 1911

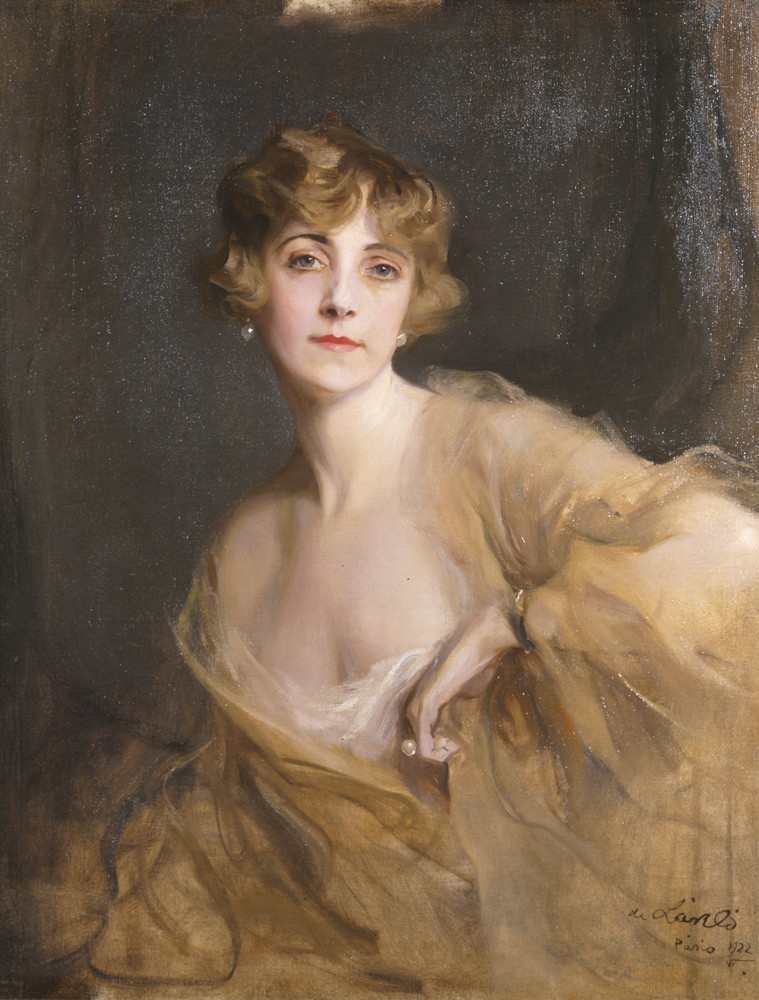
Baroness Eugène von Rothschild; formerly Countess Erwein von Schönborn-Buchheim (née Kitty Wolff)

- Countess Erwein Ferdinand von Schönborn-Buchheim (née Katherine "Kitty" Wolff, aka Katherine Francisca "Kitty" Wolf, previously Spotswood) on 24 October 1911, later Baroness Eugène Daniel von Rothschild on 28 April 1925
- Princess Victor von Thurn und Taxis (née Lida Eleanor Nicolls, previously Fitzgerald) on 1 November 1911
- Mildred Stonor, Baroness Camoys (née Mildred Constance Sherman) on 25 November 1911
- Baroness Hardouin de Reinach-Werth (née Diana Morgan Hill) on 6 December 1911
- Marguerite Caetani, Princess di Bassiano and Duchess di Sermoneta (née Marguerite Chapin) in 1911
- Countess Anton Apponyi de Nagy-Appony (née Kate "Kitty" Nelke) on 3 June 1912
- The Hon. Mrs Alfred Anson (née Lela Amelia Alexander, previously Emery) on 1 July 1912
- Antoinette Brett, Viscountess Esher (née Antoinette Heckscher) on 1 October 1912
- Princess Barbara Troubetzkoy (née Barbara Woolworth Hutton), also Princess Mdivani, Countess Reventlow, Baroness Von Cramm on 14 November 1912
- Constance de Lasteyrie du Saillant, Marquise de Lasteyrie du Saillant (née Constance Whitney Warren) on 19 December 1912
- Margaret Vanneck, Baroness Huntingfield (née Margaret Eleanor Crosby) on 21 December 1912
- Princess Michel Murat (née Helena McDonald Stallo) on 6 February 1913
- Elinor Chapelle de Jumilhac, Duchess de Richelieu (née Elinor Douglas Wise) on 8 February 1913
- Princess Daria Karageorgevich (née Myra Abigail "Abbie" Pankhurst, previously Pratt) on 11 June 1913
- Princess Aymon de Faucigny-Lucinge (née Carolyn Salome Foster, previously Stickney) on 2 July 1913
- Nancy, Duchess of Croÿ (née Nancy Louise Leishman) on 24 October 1913
- Countess Paul Cornet de Ways-Ruart (née Gladys Villiers McMillan) on 18 February 1914
- Mae Wellesley, Countess Cowley (née Mae Josephine Callicott, aka Mae Pickard or May Picard) on 23 February 1914
- Countess Armand de Jumilhac (née Ethel Lynde Barbey, previously Norrie) on 13 June 1914
- Princess Francesco Luigi Rospigliosi (née Laura McDonald Stallo) on 30 June 1914
- Countess Gyula Apponyi de Nagy-Appony (née Gladys Virginia Steuart) on 29 July 1914
- Julia Greg, Lady Greg (née Julia Fairchild Schreiner) in 1914
- Elizabeth, Baroness von Barchfeld (née Elizabeth Reid Rogers) on 14 January 1915
- Princess Ludovico Pignatelli d'Aragon (née Ruth Morgan Waters) on 4 May 1915
- Nobile Miriam Caracciolo dei Duchi di Melito (née Miriam Terry Crosby, aka Countess Miriam Caracciolo di Melito) on 3 June 1915
- Eleanor Methuen, Baroness Methuen (née Eleanor "Norah" Hennessy) on 6 July 1915
- Countess Roger de Périgny (née Frances Evelyn "Fannie" Bostwick, previously Francis) on 17 August 1915
- Emily de La Grange, Baroness de La Grange (née Emily Eleanor Sloane) on 15 September 1915
- Duchess Henry Borwin zu Mecklenburg (née Natalie "Lily" Oelrichs, previously Martin, aka Duchess of Stargard) in 1915
- Ida Minotto, Countess Minotto (née Ida May Swift) on 15 January 1916
- Countess Fal de Saint-Phalle (née Marie Guidet Abeel Duryee) on 9 May 1916
- Grace Sandilands, Lady Torphichen (née Grace Douglass Pierce) on 3 June 1916
- Princess Andrea Boncompagni-Ludovisi-Rondinelli-Vitelli, Marquise di Bucine (née Margaret Preston Draper) on 25 October 1916

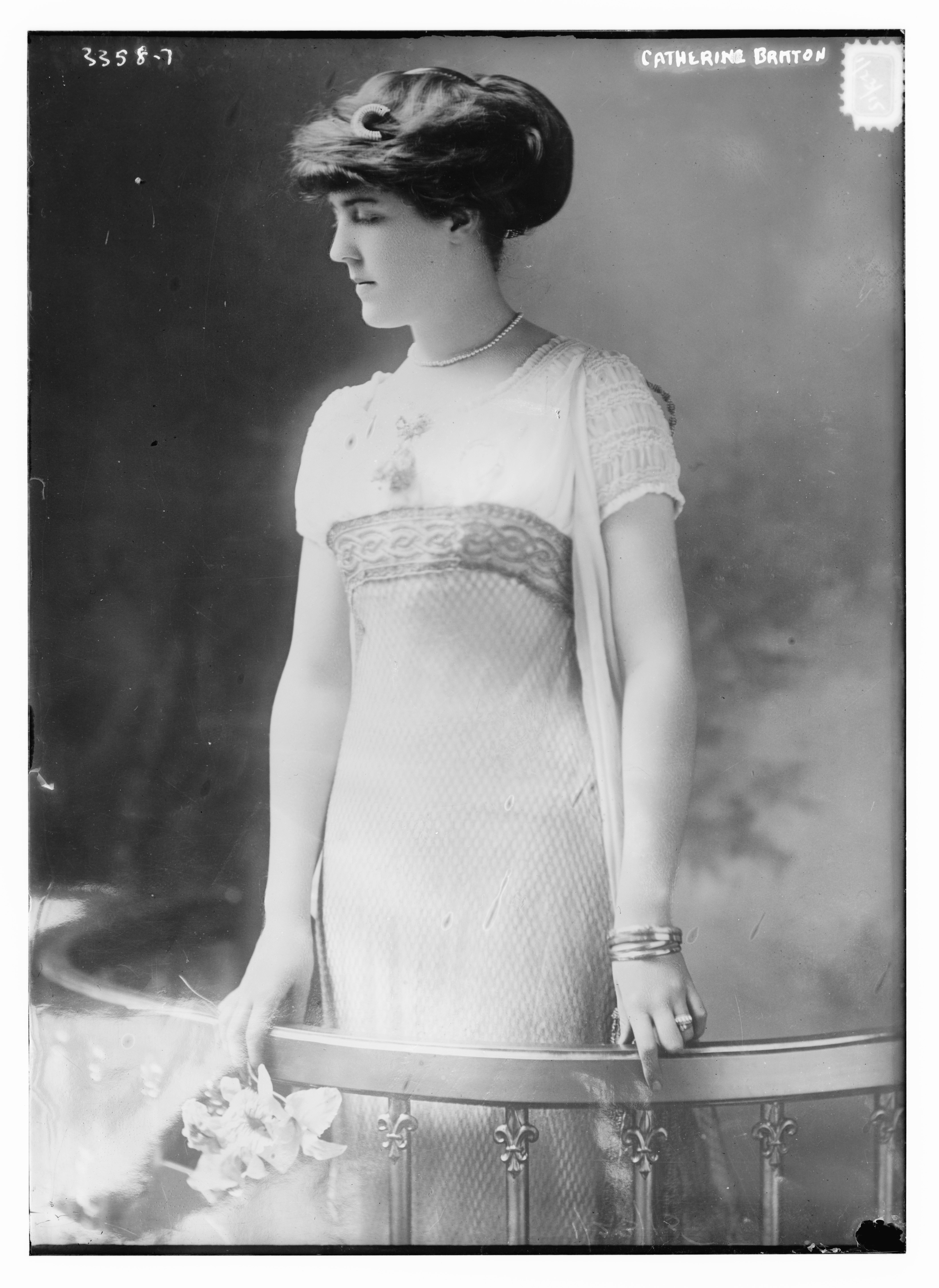
Princess Alfred zu Hohenlohe-Waldenburg-Schillingsfürst (née Catherine Britton)

- Princess Alfred zu Hohenlohe-Waldenburg-Schillingsfürst (née Catherine Britton) on 14 December 1916
- Grace Curzon, Marchioness Curzon of Kedleston (née Grace Elvina Hinds, previously Duggan) on 2 January 1917
- Princess Houreddin Vlora (née Helen Margaret Kelly, previously Thomas) on 20 June 1917 (Note: The princely title of Houreddin Vlora is considered non-genuine although tolerated in society.)
- Peggy Brodrick, Viscountess Dunsford (née Margaret "Peggy" Rush) on 23 June 1917
- Countess Robert de Buyer-Mimeure (née Daisy Polk) on 19 September 1917
- Eva Gourgaud, Baroness Gourgaud (née Eva Buckingham Gebhard) on 25 September 1917
- Baroness Friedrich von und zu Weichs zur Wenne (née Vernal Edna Andrews, aka Fern Andra) on 28 September 1917
- Nina de Polignac, Marquise de Polignac (née Nina Floyd Crosby, previously Eustis) on 24 October 1917
- Cécile de Talleyrand-Périgord, Duchess of Montmorency (née Cecilia "Cécile" Ulman, previously Blumenthal) on 14 November 1917
- Princess Afonso of Braganza, Duchess of Porto (née Nevada Stoody, aka Nevada Stoody Hayes, previously Van Volkenburgh) on 23 November 1917
- Mary Spears, Lady Spears [1942] (née Mary "May" Borden, previously Turner) in January 1918
- Countess André de Limur (née Ethel Mary Crocker) on 27 March 1918 (Note: The comital title of André de Limur (born into a French ancienne bourgeoisie family with noble connections) is considered non-genuine although tolerated in society.)
- Baroness Alfred de Ropp (née Olivia Pillsbury) on 12 March 1919
- Princess Dmitri Golitsyn (née Frances Simpson Stevens) on 19 April 1919
- Ava Lister, Baroness Ribblesdale (née Ava Lowle Willing, previously Astor) on 5 June 1919
- Countess Mario Panciera di Zoppola (née Edith Mary "Tookie" Mortimer) on 21 June 1919
- Baroness Emile de Cartier de Marchienne (née Marie Emery Dow, previously Cary) on 16 July 1919
- Countess Eugeniusz Dąmbski on 5 November 1919, then Princess Serge Mdivani on 14 May 1927 (née Apolonia Chałupiec, aka Pola Negri) (Note: The princely title of Serge Mdivani is considered doubtful although tolerated in society.)
- Princess Marie-André Poniatowski (née Frances Alice Willing Lawrance) on 27 December 1919
- Princess Anastasia of Greece and Denmark (Note: The princely title "and Denmark" of Princess Anastasia of Greece (née Stewart) is unlawful by a consideration of the morganatic nature of her marriage for Denmark, although tolerated in society.) (née Nonie "Nancy" May Stewart, previously Leeds) on 1 January 1920
- Countess Alexandre de Saint-Phalle (née Helene Georgia Harper) on 6 April 1920
- Mary Wallop, Viscountess Lymington (née Mary Lawrence Post) on 31 July 1920
- Ruth de Villiers, Viscountess du Terrage (née Ruth King) on 4 November 1920
- Eleanor Stuart, Countess Castle Stewart (née Eleanor May Guggenheim) on 16 December 1920
- Gladys Spencer-Churchill, Duchess of Marlborough (née Gladys Marie Deacon) on 25 June 1921
- Princess Mikhail Cantacuzène, Countess Speransky (née Clarissa Pelham Curtis) on 26 June 1921
- Edith Paget, Baroness Queenborough (née Edith Starr Miller) on 19 July 1921
- Alice de Janzé, Countess de Janzé (née Alice Silverthorne) on 21 September 1921
- Evelyn de Crussol, Duchess de Crussol (née Evelyn Anne Gordon) on 10 October 1921
- Countess Anastasy Vonsyatsky (née Marion Buckingham Ream) on 4 February 1922
- Countess Edward Zichy de Zich et Vásonkeő (née Charlotte Gardiner Demarest) on 10 May 1922
- Mary Lagergren, Marquise Lagergren (née Mary Moore Ogden, previously Sherman) on 12 July 1922
- Catherine Herbert, Countess of Carnarvon (née Anne Catherine Tredick Wendell) on 17 July 1922
- Margaret Dukes, Lady Dukes (née Margaret Stuyvesant Rutherfurd, previously Mills) in October 1922, then Princess Charles Murat on 5 July 1929
- Kathleen Feilding, Countess of Denbigh (née Kathleen Emmet) on 12 February 1923
- Gwendolin Edmonstone, Lady Edmonstone (née Gwendolin Marshall Field) on 5 April 1923
- Countess Carlo Dentice di Frasso (née Dorothy Caldwell Taylor, previously Grahame-White) on 9 July 1923
- Jessica Carnegie, Countess of Northesk (née Jessica Ruth Brown, previously Reinhard) on 19 July 1923
- Countess Roger de Périgny (née Margaret Copley Thaw, previously Carnegie) on 12 November 1923
- Countess Ludwig von Salm-Hoogstraeten (née Mary Millicent Abigail Rogers) on 8 January 1924
- Iris Origo, Marquise di Val d'Orcia (née Iris Margaret Cutting) on 4 March 1924
- The Hon. Mrs John Francis Amherst Cecil (née Cornelia Stuyvesant Vanderbilt) on 29 April 1924
- Princess Viggo of Schleswig-Holstein-Sonderburg-Glücksburg, Countess af Rosenborg (née Eleanor Margaret Green) on 10 June 1924
- Barbara Stuart, Countess of Moray (née Barbara Murray) on 21 June 1924
- Elizabeth Lindsay, Lady Lindsay (née Elizabeth Sherman Hoyt) on 14 July 1924
- Valérie Pozzo di Borgo, Duchess Pozzo di Borgo (née Valerie "Valérie" Norrie) on 21 July 1924
- Princess Obolensky-Neledinsky-Meletzky on 24 July 1924, then Ava Hofmann, Edle von Hofmannsthal on 21 January 1933 (née Ava Alice Muriel Astor)
- Countess Pierre de Jumilhac (née Constance Crowninshield Coolidge, previously Atherton) on 11 October 1924
- Philippa Stewart, Countess of Galloway (née Philippa Fendall Wendell) on 14 October 1924
- Margaret Caracciolo, Princess di Castagneto and Duchess di Melito (née Margaret Clarke) on 8 January 1925
- Gloria Le Bailly de La Falaise, Marquise de La Coudraye (née Gloria May Josephine Swanson, previously Somborn) on 28 January 1925
- Countess Raoul de Roussy de Sales (née Reine Marie Tracy, previously Stewart) on 5 February 1925
- Katherine James, Baroness Northbourne (née Katherine Louise Nickerson) on 4 March 1925
- Kay Bourbon del Monte, Princess di San Faustino (née Katherine "Kay" Linn Sage) on 30 March 1925
- Baroness Roland de Graffenried de Villars (née Dorothy Gould) on 5 May 1925
- Princess Guido Pignatelli (née Constance Grenelle Wilcox) on 28 August 1925
- Princess Eduard Josef von Lobkowicz (née Anita Hegeler Lihme, aka Princess Edward Joseph de Lobkowicz) on 29 August 1925
- Princess Mstislav Galitzine, Countess Ostermann (née Amy "Aimée" Isabella Crocker, previously Miskinoff) on 22 September 1925
- Nobile Marion Dusmet de Smours dei Duchi Dusmet de Smours (née Marion "Polly" Hubbard Powers) on 30 September 1925
- Baroness Jean de Lustrac (née Helen Reid) on 24 November 1925
- Elsie Mendl, Lady Mendl (née Ella "Elsie" Anderson De Wolfe) on 10 March 1926
- Thelma Furness, Viscountess Furness (née Thelma Morgan, previously Converse) on 27 June 1926
- Princess David Mdivani (née Marie Adrienne Koenig, aka Mae Murray) on 27 June 1926 (Note: The princely title of David Mdivani is considered doubtful although tolerated in society.)
- Marian Chigi Albani della Rovere, Princess Chigi Albani della Rovere (née Marian Berry) on 16 July 1926
- Princess Romanovskaya-Ilyinskaya on 21 November 1926, then Princess Dimitri Djordjadze in March 1937 (née Anna Audrey Emery)
- Princess Levan Melikov (née Rosalie Hooker, previously Dixon, aka Princess Melikov de Somhetie) in 1926
- Countess Gaston de Galard de Béarn, Countess de Béarn (née Monica Maude Avery) on 25 April 1927
- Countess André-Marie de Saint-Phalle (née Jeanne Jacqueline Harper) on 7 June 1927
- Doña Margaret Strong Rockefeller de Cuevas Bartholín, Marquise de Piedrablanca de Guana, aka Marquise de Cuevas (née Margaret Rockefeller Strong) on 3 August 1927
- Princess Balthazar Gyalma Odescalchi (née Elaine Wilhelmine Daniels Willcox) on 30 September 1927
- Doña Olga Leighton Ayre de Cabeza de Vaca Carvajal, Marquise de Portago (née Olga Beatrice Leighton, previously MacKey) on 20 November 1927
- Baroness Maximilian Edmund von Romberg (née Emily Purdon Hall) on 14 April 1928
- Nobile Marie Sommaripa dei Signori di Paro e Andro (née Marie Seton) on 11 August 1928
- Countess Paul Pálffy ab Erdöd (née Eleanor Jenckes Roelker, previously Tweed) on 25 August 1928
- Princess Charles-Philippe d'Orléans, Duchess of Nemours (née Marguerite Watson) on 24 September 1928
- Beatrice Acheson, Countess of Gosford (née Beatrice Claflin, previously Breese) on 1 October 1928
- Countess Folke Bernadotte, Countess af Wisborg (née Estelle Romaine Manville) on 1 December 1928
- The Hon. Mrs Michael Simon Scott (née Ruth Brady) on 31 December 1928
- Mary Virginia Law, Baroness Coleraine (née Mary Virginia Nellis) on 26 January 1929
- Princess Heinrich Reuss zu Köstritz (née Allene Tew, previously Burchard) on 10 April 1929, then Countess Pavel Kotzebue on 4 March 1936
- Countess Cyril Tolstoy (née Gwendolyn Currie, previously Seyburn) on 15 June 1929
- Caroline Nicolis, Countess di Robilant e Cereaglio (née Caroline Kent) on 1 October 1929
- Baroness James-Ferdinand Baeyens (née Mary Cecelia "Cecilia" Clark) on 16 October 1929
- Genevieve de Janzé, Countess de Janzé (née Genevieve Willinger, previously Ryan) on 9 January 1930
- Marion Butler, Countess of Carrick (née Marion Caher Donoghue, previously Edwards) on 14 August 1930, then Marion Cavendish, Baroness Chesham on 20 October 1938
- The Hon. Mrs Andrew Nicholas Armstrong Vanneck (née Louise Hollingsworth Morris Clews) on 1 September 1930, then Louise Campbell, Duchess of Argyll on 23 November 1935
- Baroness Emmanuel d'Astier de La Vigerie (née Grace Roosevelt Temple) on 2 March 1931
- Princess Serge Mdivani (née Mamie Harris, aka Mary McCormic, previously Rankin) on 27 April 1931
- Princess Johannes von Liechtenstein (née Aleene McFarland) on 29 July 1931
- Countess Sophus Danneskiold-Samsøe (née Isabel Craven Dilworth, aka Nina Romano, previously Van Dommelen) on 24 October 1931
- Constance Le Bailly de La Falaise, Marquise de La Coudraye (née Constance Campbell Bennett, previously Plant) on 22 November 1931
- Countess Giovanni Guido Carlo Cardelli (née Jacqueline Melanie Stewart) on 23 November 1931
- Marian Rospigliosi, Princess Rospigliosi and Duchess di Zagarolo (née Marian Adair Snowden) on 27 November 1931
- Renee Carafa, Duchess d'Andria e Castel del Monte (née Renee Thornton, previously Hageman) on 27 January 1932
- Katherine Runciman, Viscountess Runciman of Doxford (née Katherine Schuyler Garrison) on 11 April 1932
- Lady Charles Cavendish (née Adele Marie Austerlitz, aka Adele Astaire) on 9 May 1932
- Elizabeth Prescott, Lady Prescott (née Elizabeth Hughes Melcer) on 12 November 1932
- Isabel, Countess von Ostheim (née Isabel Neilson) on 28 November 1932
- Lillie Apuzzo di Portanova, Baroness di Portanova (née Lillie Cranz Cullen) on 16 December 1932
- Princess Irbain-Khan Kaplanoff (née Vernon Marguerite Rogers Magoffin, previously Siems, then Steel) on 11 January 1933
- Countess René von La Fontaine und Harnoncourt-Unverzagt (née Sarah Carr) on 29 May 1933
- Mary Elsie Wellesley, Countess Cowley (née Mary Elsie May, previously Himes) on 18 June 1933
- Princess Alexis Mdivani (née Barbara Woolworth Hutton) on 22 June 1933, then Countess Kurt von Haugwitz-Reventlow on 14 May 1935, then Princess Igor Troubetzkoy (previously Grant) on 1 April 1947, then Baroness Gottfried von Cramm (previously Rubirosa) in November 1955 (Note: The princely title of Alexis Mdivani is considered doubtful although tolerated in society.)
- Janet Caravita, Princess di Sirignano (née Janet Elizabeth Snowden) in August 1933
- Countess Franz Ferdinand von Colloredo-Mannsfeld (née Mabel Bayard Bradley) on 3 October 1933
- Helen de Goyon, Duchess de Feltre (née Helen Seton) on 21 October 1933
- Countess Antoine Sala (née Laura Bache Kayser, previously Bayer) in 1933
- Nancy Wyndham-Quin, Countess of Dunraven and Mount-Earl (née Nancy Yuille) on 7 March 1934
- Carroll Tennyson, Baroness Tennyson (née Carroll Elting, previously Donner) on 14 April 1934
- Baroness Carl von dem Bussche-Haddenhausen (née Josephine Timberlake) on 13 October 1934
- Elizabeth de la Poer Beresford, Baroness Decies (née Elizabeth Wharton Drexel, previously Lehr) on 25 May 1936
- Princess Serge Wolkonsky (née Mary Walker Fearn, previously French) on 8 July 1936
- Joan Baldwin, Countess Baldwin of Bewdley (née Joan Elspeth Tomes) on 25 August 1936
- Sallie Ponsonby, Baroness Sysonby (née Sallie Whitney Sanford) on 2 October 1936
- Geraldine Lindsay-Hogg, Lady Lindsay-Hogg (née Geraldine Mary Fitzgerald) on 18 November 1936
- Princess Guido Pignatelli (née Henrietta Guerard Pollitzer, previously Hartford) on 25 April 1937
- Wallis Windsor, Duchess of Windsor (née Bessie Wallis Warfield, previously Simpson) on 3 June 1937
- Virginia Child-Villiers, Countess of Jersey (née Virginia Cherrill, previously Grant) on 30 July 1937
- Rozell Empain, Baroness Empain (née Rozell Rowland) on 4 November 1937
- Barbara Petty-Fitzmaurice, Marchioness of Lansdowne (née Barbara Dempsey Chase) on 18 March 1938
- Princess Artchil Gourielli-Tchkonia (née Chaya Rubinstein, aka Helena Rubinstein, previously Titus) in June 1938 (Note: The princely title of Artchil Tchkonia is considered non-genuine although tolerated in society.)
- Lela de Talleyrand-Périgord, Duchess de Talleyrand and Duchess di Dino (née Lela Alexander Emery, previously Mackintosh) on 30 August 1938
- Countess Lorenzo Paolozzi (née Alice "Alicia" Orpha Spaulding) on 30 October 1938
- Princess Alexis Obolensky (née Jane Wheeler Irby) on 6 January 1939
- The Hon. Mrs Cecil Howard (née Frances Dean, aka Frances Drake) on 12 February 1939
- Princess Kirill Scherbatoff (née Adelaide Sedgwick, previously Munroe) on 27 April 1939
- Vera Swettenham, Lady Swettenham (née Vera Seton Gordon, previously Guthrie) on 22 June 1939
- Patricia Ponsonby, Countess of Bessborough (née Patricia Minnigerode) on 28 July 1939
- Princess Michel Murat (née Helen Isabel McMillin) on 25 September 1939
- Countess Oleg Cassini Loiewski (née Gene Eliza Tierney) on 1 June 1941
- Princess Vladimir Eristavi-Tchitcherine (née Lucy Cotton, previously Magraw) on 15 June 1941
- Josephine Molyneux, Countess of Sefton (née Josephine Armstrong, previously Gwynne) on 9 December 1941
- Princess Serge Troubetzkoy (née Dorothy Livingston Ulrich) on 25 December 1941
- Princess Serge Gagarin (née Frances "Patty" Wickham Moore) on 22 September 1942
- Oona Chaplin, Lady Chaplin [1975] (née Oona O'Neill) on 16 June 1943
- Princess Serge Belosselsky-Belozersky (née Florence Crane, previously Robinson) on 27 November 1943
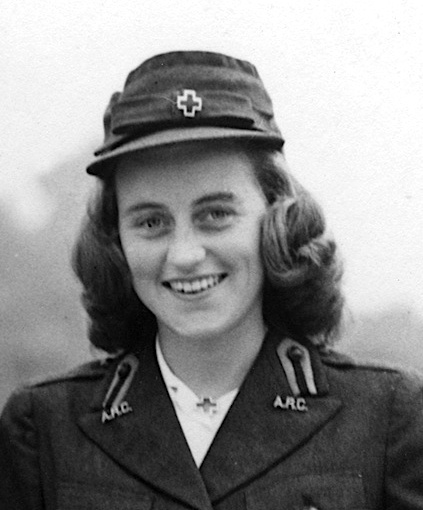
- Kathleen Cavendish, Marchioness of Hartington (née Kathleen Agnes Kennedy)
  Kathleen Cavendish, Marchioness of Hartington (née Kathleen Agnes "Kick" Kennedy) on 6 May 1944
- Princess Johannes von Liechtenstein (née Jean Ann French) on 27 August 1945
- Aimee Corsini dei Principi Corsini, Marquise di Lajatico (née Aimee Gaillard Russell) on 26 November 1945
- Carolyn de Crussol, Duchess d'Uzès (née Carolyn Baily Brown) on 18 July 1946
- Susan Russell, Viscountess Amberley (née Susan Doniphan Lindsay) on 28 August 1946
- Princess Dominik Rainer Radziwiłł (née Lida Lacey Bloodgood) on 8 January 1947
- Doña María Aline Griffith Dexter de Figueroa Perez de Guzmán el Bueno, Countess de Quintanilla and Countess de Romanones (née Aline Griffith) on 26 June 1947
- Countess Rodolfo Crespi (née Consuelo Pauline O'Brien O'Connor) on 22 January 1948
- Countess Hans Christoph von Seherr-Thoss (née Sonia Phipps, previously Farrell) on 2 March 1948
- Countess Bernard d'Harcourt (née Zina Rachevsky) on 4 November 1948
- The Hon. Mrs Bartholomew Pleydell-Bouverie (née Katharine Bradley Tod, previously Martin) on 22 January 1949
- Caroline Benn, Viscountess Stansgate (née Caroline Middleton DeCamp) on 17 June 1949
- Princess Ivan Obolensky (née Claire Elizabeth McGinnis) on 10 October 1949
- Doña Carroll McDaniel Brown de Cabeza de Vaca Leighton, Marquise de Portago (née Helen Carroll McDaniel) on 1 December 1949
- Princess Ferdinand von Liechtenstein (née Dorothy Haydel, previously Oelrichs) on 21 August 1950
- Countess Édouard Decazes de Glücksbierg (née Caroline Triplett Taliaferro Scott) on 4 November 1950
- Mildred Capell, Countess of Essex (née Zara Mildred Carlson) on 10 December 1950
- Princess Alexander zu Hohenlohe-Waldenburg-Schillingsfürst (née Patricia Anne "Honeychile" Wilder, previously Cernadas) on 21 May 1951
- Princess Edmond Poniatowski (née Anne "Frances" "Nancy" Darwin Goodrich) on 1 May 1952
- Virginia Ogilvy, Countess of Airlie (née Virginia Fortune Ryan) on 23 October 1952
- Princess Alexis Obolensky (née Katherine Taylor "Kappy" Pearce, previously Gennett) on 22 November 1952
- Edith Russell, Countess Russell (née Edith Finch) on 15 December 1952
- Lady Malcolm Douglas-Hamilton (née Natalie Scarritt Wales, previously Paine) on 4 January 1953
- Baroness Robert Silvercruys (née Rosemary Turner, previously McMahon) on 28 September 1953
- Baroness Philippe de Rothschild (née Pauline Fairfax Potter, previously Leser) on 8 April 1954
- Countess Albrecht von Bismarck-Schönhausen (née Mona Travis Strader, aka Mona Bismarck, previously Williams) on 5 January 1955
- Countess Friedrich Werner von der Schulenburg (née Jessie Suzanna Huff, aka Suzanna "Susanna" Jessica von der Schulenburg) on 5 February 1955
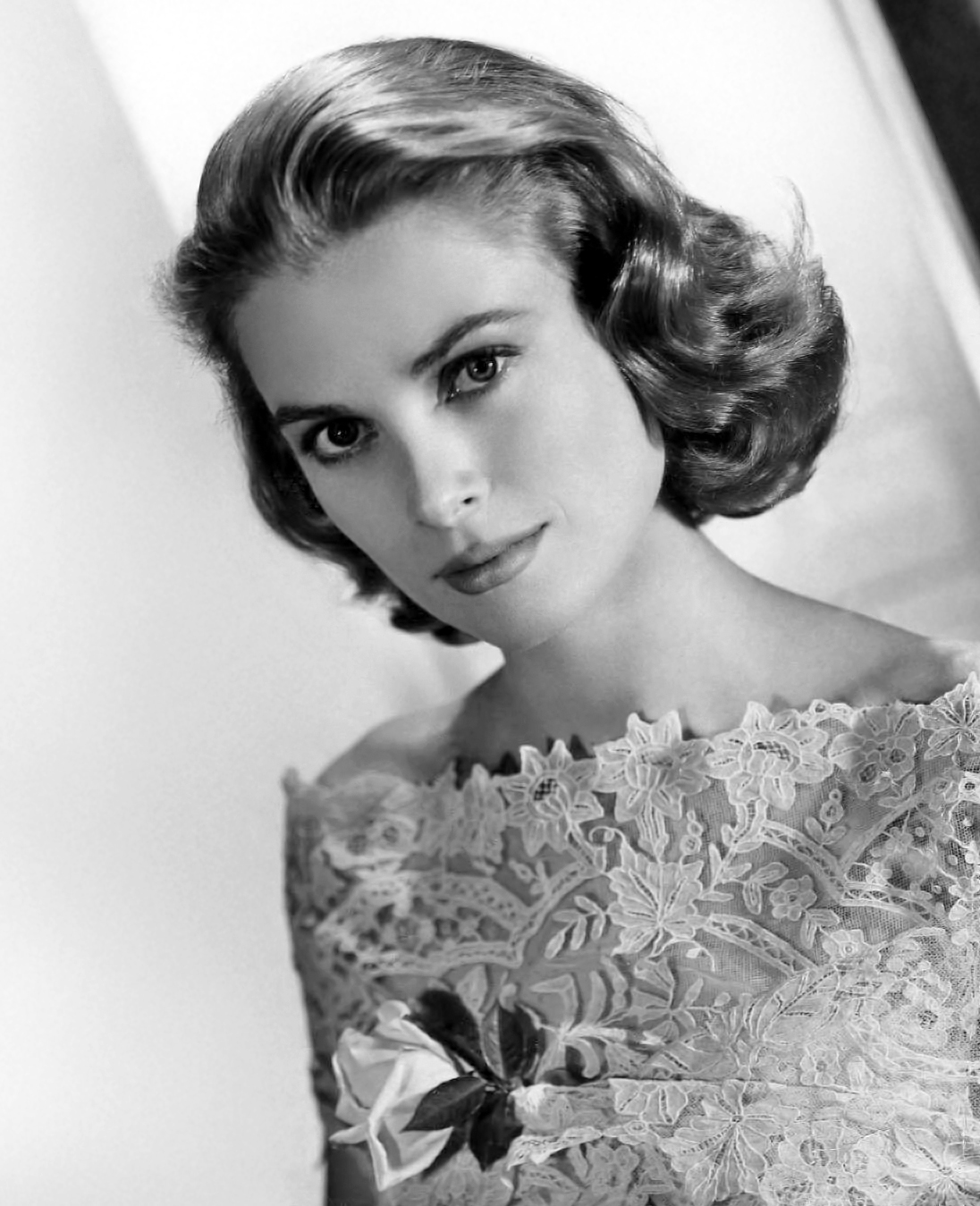
- Grace, Princess of Monaco (née Grace Patricia Kelly)
  The Princess of Monaco (née Grace Patricia Kelly) on 19 April 1956
- Princess Alfred von Auersperg (née Martha Sharp Crawford, aka "Sunny" von Bülow) on 20 July 1957
- Frances Manners, Duchess of Rutland (née Frances Helen Sweeny) on 15 May 1958
- The Hon. Mrs Anthony George Lowther (née Lavinia Joyce) on 22 July 1958
- Patricia Foley, Baroness Foley (née Patricia Zoellner, previously Meek) on 23 December 1958
- Nobile Catherine Cordero dei Marchesi di Montezemolo (née Catherine Bradley Murray) in 1958
- Princess Stanisław Albrecht Radziwiłł (née Caroline Lee Bouvier, previously Canfield) on 19 March 1959
- Evelyn Sassoon, Lady Sassoon (née Maude Evelyn "Barnsie" Barnes) on 1 April 1959
- Princess Charles d'Arenberg (née Margaret Wright "Peggy" Bedford, previously Bancroft) on 29 December 1960, then Duchess d'Uzès on 12 July 1968
- Princess Andrew Romanov (née Kathleen Norris, previously Roberts) on 21 March 1961
- Countess Guy-Philippe Lannes de Montebello (née Edith Bradford Myles) on 24 June 1961
- Princess Nikita Romanov (née Janet Schonwald) on 14 July 1961
- Countess Friedrich Karl von Schönborn-Buchheim (née Edith Carpenter Macy) on 30 July 1961
- Marina Vaizey, Baroness Vaizey [1976] (née Marina Alandra Stansky) on 23 September 1961
- Nancy Keith, Lady Keith (née Mary Raye Gross, aka Nancy "Slim" Keith, previously Hayward) in 1962
- Nancy Lowther, Countess of Lonsdale (née Nancy Ruth Cobbs, previously Stephenson) on 6 March 1963
- Mathilda Campbell, Duchess of Argyll (née Mathilda Coster Mortimer, previously Heller) on 15 June 1963
- Baroness William von Mueffling (née Marsha Millard) on 6 June 1964

== After 1965 ==
No hereditary peerages have been created in the UK since Baron Margadale on 1 January 1965.

- Lady Charles Spencer-Churchill (née Gillian Spreckels Fuller) on 30 July 1965
- Mary Harmsworth, Viscountess Rothermere (née Mary Murchison, previously Ohrstrom) on 28 March 1966
- Countess Jean-François de Chambrun (née Josalee Douglas) on 3 May 1966
- Amanda Borghese, Princess di Sant'Angelo e di San Polo and Duchess di Bomarzo (née Amanda Lewis, aka Amanda Leigh) in July 1966
- Countess Augusto Gregorini di Savignano di Romagna (née Barbara Goldbach, aka Barbara Bach) in 1966, later Barbara Starkey, Lady Starkey on 27 April 1981
- Baroness Otto von Hoffmann (née Barbara Kingsbury, aka Barbara Carrera) in 1966
- Marina Berry, Viscountess Camrose (née Marina Beatrice Sulzberger) on 4 January 1967
- Princess Charles of Luxembourg (née Joan Douglas Dillon, previously Moseley) on 1 March 1967, later Joan de Noailles, Duchess of Mouchy on 3 August 1978
- Eliza Moore, Viscountess Moore (née Eliza Winn Lloyd) on 15 May 1968
- Lois Menu de Ménil, Baroness de Ménil (née Lois Ames Pattison) on 3 August 1968
- Elizabeth Montagu, Duchess of Manchester (née Elizabeth Fullerton, previously Crocker) on 7 February 1969
- Linda McCartney, Lady McCartney [1997] (née Linda Louise Eastman, previously See) on 12 March 1969
- Countess Hans Heinrich von Coudenhove-Kalergi (née Cornelia "Nini" Carter Roberts) on 6 September 1969
- Pamela Ormsby-Gore, Baroness Harlech (née Pamela Colin) on 11 December 1969
- Baroness Donald von Wiedenmann (née Ellen Naomi Cohen, aka Cass Elliot, previously Hendricks) on 12 July 1971
- Countess Edmond de La Haye Jousselin (née Anne Guestier Manice) on 28 October 1972
- Dorothy Weir, Viscountess Weir (née Dorothy Dear, previously Hutton) on 3 March 1973
- Victoria de Rothschild, Lady de Rothschild (née Victoria Lou Schott) on 1 July 1973
- Countess Bernard Claret de La Touche (née Roberta Downs) on 20 August 1973 (Note: The comital title of Bernard Claret de La Touche (born into a French ancienne bourgeoisie family with noble connections) is considered non-genuine although tolerated in society.)
- Princess Tassilo zu Fürstenberg (née Cecil Amelia "Titi" Blaffer, previously Hudson) on 17 October 1975
- Catherine de Castelbajac, Marquise de Castelbajac (née Katherine "Catherine" "Kate" Lee Chambers) on 5 April 1979
- Countess Thierry de Ganay (née Frances Akin Spence) on 14 July 1981
- Baroness Arnaud de Rosnay (née Jenna Severson) on 12 September 1981, (Note: The baronial title of Arnaud de Rosnay (born into a French ancienne bourgeoisie family with noble connections) is considered non-genuine although tolerated in society.) later Countess Emmanuel de Buretel de Chassey on 29 August 1993
- Mary Eccles, Viscountess Eccles (née Mary Morley Crapo, previously Hyde) on 26 September 1984
- Frau Martin von Haselberg (née Bette Midler) on 16 December 1984
- Jamie Haden-Guest, Baroness Haden-Guest (née Jamie Lee Curtis) on 18 December 1984
- Baroness François de Ménil (née Susan Kadin Silver) on 18 January 1985
- Monica Neumann von Héthárs, Frau von Héthárs (née Monica Ann Ford, aka Baroness Monica von Neumann) in 1985
- Diane Thatcher, Lady Thatcher [1990] (née Diane Burgdorf) on 14 February 1987
- Countess Carl-Eduard von Bismarck-Schönhausen (née Laura Elena Martínez Herring, aka Laura Harring) on 27 February 1987
- Countess Anton-Wolfgang von Faber-Castell (née Mary Elizabeth Hogan) on 12 December 1987
- Princess Andrew Romanov (née Inez Bachelin, previously Storer) on 17 December 1987
- Johnine Colonna, Duchess di San Cesareo (née Johnine Leigh Avery, previously Van den Heever) on 27 December 1991
- Countess Géza von Habsburg (née Elizabeth Jane Kunstadter) on 4 January 1992
- Countess Alexandre de Lesseps (née LuAnn Nadeau) on 16 March 1993
- Countess Patrick Houitte de La Chesnais (née Stefanie Zofya Paul, aka Stefanie Powers, previously Lockwood) on 1 April 1993
- Princess Julie of Nassau (née Julia "Julie" Elizabeth Houston Ongaro) on 29 January 1994
- Princess Alexander-Georg Auersperg (née Nancy Louise Weinberg) on 10 June 1995
- Marie-Chantal, Crown Princess of Greece (née Marie-Chantal Claire Miller) on 1 July 1995
- Princess Alexander von Fürstenberg (née Alexandra Natasha Miller) on 28 October 1995

== Fictional American heiresses ==
- Alexis Colby, Fallon Carrington Colby, Amanda Carrington, Krystle Carrington, and Dominique Deveraux in the TV series Dynasty
- Pamela "Pam" Barnes Ewing, April Stevens Ewing, Ann Ewing, Sue Ellen Ewing, Valene Ewing, and Lucy Ewing in the TV series Dallas
- Constance Weldon Carlyle in the primetime TV soap opera Flamingo Road
- Angela Channing in the primetime TV soap opera Falcon Crest
- Sue Ellen Mischke in the sitcom Seinfeld
- Mary Beth in the TV series Desperate Housewives
- Stephanie Forrester, Pamela Douglas, Felicia Forrester, Stephanie "Steffy" Forrester, Phoebe Forrester, Brooke Logan, Taylor Hayes, Darla Forrester, Caroline Spencer, and Caroline Spencer Forrester in the TV soap opera The Bold and the Beautiful
- Mackenzie Browning, Gloria Abbott Bardwell, Jill Foster Abbott, Victoria Newman, Cassie Newman, Abby Newman, Summer Newman, Colleen Carlton, Faith Newman, Ashley Abbott, Katherine "Katie" Newman, and Katherine Chancellor in the TV soap opera The Young and the Restless
- Victoria Lord, Meredith Lord, Tina Lord, Megan Gordon, Jessica Buchanan, Natalie Buchanan, Sarah Roberts, Starr Manning, Dorian Lord, Blair Cramer, Kelly Cramer, Adriana Cramer, Cassie Callison, and Langston Wilde in the TV soap opera One Life to Live
- Claire Meade and Alexis Meade in the American dramedy series Ugly Betty
- Cora Crawley, Countess of Grantham in the British period drama TV series Downton Abbey
- London Tipton in the American sitcom The Suite Life of Zack & Cody
- Serena van der Woodsen in the TV series Gossip Girl

== See also ==
- Born Rich, 2003 documentary created by Jamie Johnson
- The Duke's Children, 1879 novel by Anthony Trollope
- The Golden Bowl, 1904 novel by Henry James

== Sources ==
- Paul Theroff's Online Gotha
- California Digital Newspaper Collection
- D. C. O'Driscoll
- The Heirs of Europe
- Almanach de Gotha
- Burke's Peerage
- Debrett's Peerage and Baronetage
- Society at Home and Abroad
