= Robert S. de Ropp =

English biochemist & researcher (1913–1987)

Robert Sylvester de Ropp (1913–1987) was an English biochemist and a researcher and academic in that field. After retiring from biochemistry, he brought other long-time personal interests to the fore, becoming a writer in the fields of human potentials and the search for spiritual realisation.

== Early life ==
de Ropp was born in Bath, England, on February 1, 1913, the son of William de Ropp (originally Wilhelm von der Ropp) by his marriage to Ruth Fisher. The Ropp family had been land-owning barons in Lithuania. William was of Teutonic and Cossack descent, being entitled to use the title “Baron”, and was perpetually in shaky financial circumstances. He had settled in England in 1910 and become naturalised in 1913. de Ropp's mother, Ruth, was a daughter of Albert Bulteel Fisher, whose brother was the academic historian Herbert William Fisher. Ruth de Ropp died in the 1918 flu pandemic. Robert de Ropp had also contracted the flu during the pandemic, and by the time he fully recovered from its ravages he was seven years old.

After de Ropp's recovery from the flu, his father sent him as a boarder to a preparatory school, and during the school holidays he lived with various relations on his mother's side, including an aunt in Leicestershire and a great aunt at Salisbury. This institution, Cheam School, offered the then-conventional curriculum of the Greek and Latin classics, English literature, and Muscular Christianity. Although subsequently questioning the premises of formal religion, de Ropp had his first spiritual experience during his confirmation.

In 1925 de Ropp's father, being in financial difficulties, could not pay the school fees and took him out of the school. His father also remarried, and the family went to live on the old baronial estate in Lithuania. Shortly after relocating, de Ropp's father obtained work as an agent for an aircraft company in Berlin and, taking his wife there with him, abandoned Robert in the rambling ruin of the family home, where he lived with a family of Latvians attached to the old Ropp baronial estate. He lived a rustic existence in Lithuania, left to his own devices and picking up the ways of the peasants. Two years later, when he was fourteen, his father shipped him off to the semi-desert south-Australian outback to live with, and work for, a hardscrabble-farm family. Three years later, the farmer went bankrupt amid dust storms. The farming family had to leave the lad to his own devices, and the situation made him bitter and confused. Lonely and nearly penniless, hard-bitten Robert eventually made his way back to England.

At first, one of his maternal aunts took him in, then he moved to Dorking to live with one of his mother's cousins, Adeline, the first wife of composer Ralph Vaughan Williams. She figured quite importantly in his development. The traumatized and embittered Robert de Ropp gained some perspective and matured during this period of support and advanced education. Like many intelligent, humane people of his time, de Ropp was appalled by the staggering destruction and carnage that had occurred during World War I. However, he was also dismayed by the spread of fascistic ideologies in Europe in the 1930s. Given his values and desire to commit himself to a positive effort, he allied with many other British intellectuals of similar inclination in Richard Sheppard’s Peace Pledge Union — only to find hopes for effective peaceful negotiation with the Nazis dashed when Germany invaded Poland and then France.

== Career as biochemist ==
The Vaughan Williamses had paid for Robert’s further education at the Royal College of Science in South Kensington, where he eventually specialized in biology. He earned a PhD degree in plant physiology at the Royal College. During this period, as well, he developed interests in politics, philosophy, and spirituality.

In this earlier portion of his life, de Ropp was active in plant physiology and cancer research. In 1939 he was at the Research Institute of Plant Physiology at Imperial College of Science and Technology in London. In the first quarter of 1939, at Paddington, he married Eileen M. Trinder, with whom he had lived for a number of years. He and Eileen had two children. During the Second World War, de Ropp worked as a bacteriologist and plant biologist. He met Kathleen Elizabeth (Betty) Knowlman during these years, when he was involved with research at Kew Gardens (England's botanical research and education institution), at which Betty worked as a gardener. Betty later joined him in the United States after he moved there, at which time they married.

In the early 1940s, de Ropp wrote a number of research papers relating to plant physiology and tumours. By 1945 he was a Research Officer of the Agricultural Research Council at the Rothamsted Experimental Station. After emigrating to the U.S., de Ropp's professional life included a stay at the Rockefeller Institute as a visiting investigator. At various times, his research was centered on cancer, mental illness, or drugs that affect behavior. During a ten-year period working for the Lederle Laboratories near Pearl River, New York, de Ropp wrote a book for the general reader in the field of psychoactive substances (many of which are plant-derived): Drugs and the Mind.

== Avocational interests ==
de Ropp's intense avocational interests, stemming largely from a spontaneous childhood spirituality, were nurtured by the influence of P. D. Ouspensky, whom he met in 1936. "The work" (as the Ouspensky disciplines were termed) was an approach to establishing an integrated human awareness at a higher level — considered to be a true inner freedom. de Ropp went regularly to Lyne Place for "work" weekends from 1936 to 1945 and was particularly attached to Madame Ouspensky as a deeply insightful guide, until 1940. In that year the Oupenskys emigrated from Britain to the United States; after living through war conditions in Britain, de Ropp joined the Ouspenskys there on a New Jersey farm in 1945, the European hostilities being past. However, de Ropp felt the Ouspenskys' milieu had by this point become stagnant and ineffective, and he became disillusioned about the work. "Ouspensky was no longer a teacher," de Ropp opined in his autobiography.

After arriving in the U.S., Robert de Ropp, by his own efforts, built two houses, one in Connecticut, another in New York state; he and his second wife, Betty, lived in Rockland County, NY. de Ropp met G. I. Gurdjieff (the Ouspenskys' famous teacher) during Gurdjieff's final visit to New York, in 1948.

== Years in Sonoma County ==
After working for the Lederle Laboratories for 10 years, de Ropp's attachment to the northeast U.S. waned, and he felt a pull to the West Coast. In 1961 he purchased a small house on several acres, in Glen Ellen (slightly east of Santa Rosa, California), where the climate was mild and soil could be worked to high fertility. In time he became an independent writer and teacher — much concerned about humanity's growing environmental and spiritual crises — and set up a learning community on his land around 1967 The idea behind it was experiential learning at the levels of body, mind, and spirit.

de Ropp's family included the two children from his first marriage, and the children he had with his wife Betty. To support his family and finance their transition into the direct economy of living from the land and ocean, de Ropp worked until 1973 as a research scientist at the University of San Francisco. The family put down roots in their rural Sonoma-County locale, working at living simply. They grew fruits, vines, vegetables and wheat, as well as many ornamental plants. de Ropp fished in the ocean and Betty raised chickens. It was also during this time that de Ropp had an encounter with his neighbor, Hunter S. Thompson, that was immortalized in Fear and Loathing in Las Vegas. In the book, Thompson writes that the name of the "acid guru" was "redacted at insistence of [his] publisher's lawyer," but in the original Rolling Stone article both Robert S. de Ropp and his residence on Sonoma Mountain Road are unredacted.

de Ropp wrote most of his books during his Sonoma County years. Among his most influential books (concerning spiritual development) are: The Master Game and Warrior's Way: The Challenging Life Games. The first of these stands as his report on what he had learned from his teachers and from the writings of similar figures, as well as more mainstream psychologists, psychiatrists, and researchers into fields such as religion and the spiritual life. The second is in part a sequential biography, and was written near the end of his life; a significant dimension of its content is his very personal evaluation of the characters and contributions of Gurdjieff, Ouspensky, Madame Ouspensky, John G. Bennett (another direct disciple of Gurdjieff), Gerald Heard, Aldous Huxley, Timothy Leary, Stephen Gaskin, Alan Watts, Carlos Castaneda, and other figures serving as teachers of those engaged in spiritual quests. He is critical of those he views as false gurus or merely pompous, and attempts a fair-handed assessment of those he deems verbose but limited, whilst yet expressing genuine gratitude for those whose efforts he believes have enriched human life.

de Ropp died in 1987, in his mid seventies, in an accident while ocean-kayaking.

== Publications ==
=== Sample list of academic papers ===
- R. S. de Ropp, The Effect of Preliminary Soaking of the Grain on the Growth and Tropic Responses of the Excised Embryo of Winter Rye Studies in the Vernalisation of Cereals. Annals of Botany 3: 1939 243–252
- R. S. de Ropp, Studies in the Physiology of Leaf Growth: III. The Influence of Roots on the Growth Annals of Botany 10: 1946 353–359
- R. S. de Ropp, The Growth-Promoting Action of Bacteria-Free Crown-Gall Tumor Tissue Bulletin of the Torrey Botanical Club, Vol. 75, No. 1 (Jan. - Feb. 1948), pp. 45–50
- R. S. de Ropp, The Interaction of Normal and Crown-Gall Tumor Tissue in in Vitro Grafts American Journal of Botany, Vol. 35, No. 7 (Jul., 1948), pp. 372–377
- R. S. de Ropp, The Action of Some Chemical Growth Inhibitors on Healthy and Tumor Tissue of Plants Cancer Research 11, September 1, 1951 663–668,
- R. S. de Ropp and Doris McKenzie, The Transplantation of Small Numbers of Tumor Cells Cancer Research 14, September 1, 1954, 588–590
- R. S. de Ropp and Elizabeth Markley, The Correlation of Different Aspects of Auxin Action Plant Physiol. 30 (3): May 1955; 210–214.
- E. Jack Davis & R. S. de Ropp, Metabolic Origin of Urinary Methylamine in the Rat Nature 190 (13 May 1961) 636–637

=== Books ===
- Drugs and the Mind (1957)
- Man Against Aging (1960)
- Science and Salvation (1962)
- The Master Game: Beyond the Drug Experience (1968)
- Sex Energy: The Sexual Force in Man and Animals (1969)
- The New Prometheans (1972)
- Church of the Earth: The Ecology of a Creative Community (1974)
- Eco-Tech: The Whole-Earther's Guide to the Alternate Society (1975)
- Warrior's Way: The Challenging Life Games (1979)
- Self-Completion: Keys to the Meaningful Life (1988)
- Warrior's Way: A Twentieth Century Odyssey (1995)
