= Mary Evelyn Hitchcock =

American author and explorer (1849–1920)

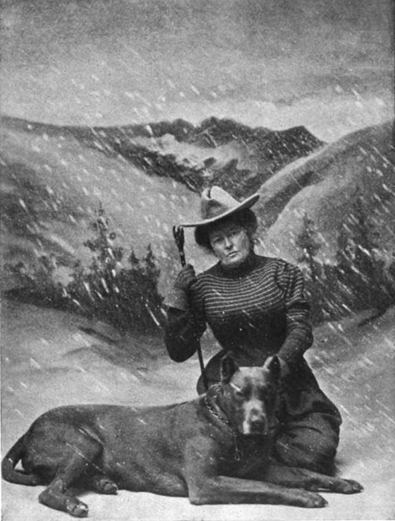
- Hitchcock in 1907
- Born: Mary Evelyn Higgins; March 10, 1849; Virginia, U.S.
- Died: April 6, 1920 (aged 71)
- Resting place: Oak Grove Cemetery, Fall River, Massachusetts, U.S.
- Education: Lawrence Academy
- Occupations: author, traveler
- Spouse(s): Roswell D. Hitchcock, Jr.
- Children: 1
- Writing career
- Pen name: Mary Doyle
- Notable work: Two women in the Klondike: the story of a journey to the gold-fields of Alaska

Mary Evelyn Hitchcock (née, Higgins; pen names, Mary Doyle and Mrs. Roswell D. Hitchcock; March 10, 1849 – April 6, 1920) was an American author and explorer from Virginia. She traveled extensively with her husband, U.S. naval officer Roswell D. Hitchcock, accompanying him to international expositions and postings in Europe and Japan. In 1898, she journeyed to the Klondike region with Edith Van Buren, an expedition that she later recounted in her book Two Women in the Klondike (1899). She spent several years in the Yukon, where she staked numerous mining claims and delivered lectures about the region. In addition to her travels and writing, Hitchcock was involved in New York City cultural and social organizations, worked as a reporter for the New York World, and was a Fellow of the National Geographic Society.

== Early life and education ==
Mary Evelyn Higgins was born in Virginia, March 10, 1849. She was the daughter of Capt. Thomas A. (of Norfolk, Virginia) and Cecelia (Fitzgerald) Higgins. She was educated at Lawrence Academy, Groton, Massachusettsm where she received academic honors.

== Career ==
She married Commander Roswell D. Hitchcock, USN, (son of Roswell Dwight Hitchcock) and they had one daughter, Harriet Bradford Hitchcock Harriman. Hitchcock accompanied her husband to the 1873 Vienna World's Fair, Paris Exposition, 1878, to Japan, 1882, where his ship remained two years; and again in 1892, when he was captain of USS Alert. After the death of the husband, she made a tour of the world.

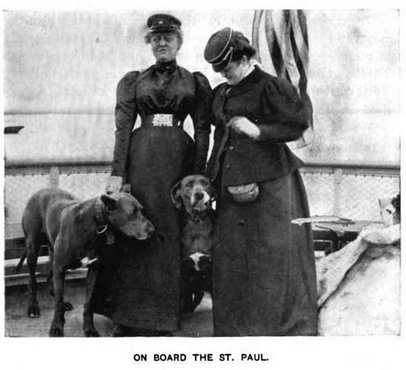
Hitchcock and Edith Van Buren on the St. Paul with their dogs.

In 1898, she went to Klondike with her friend Edith Van Buren, embarking from San Francisco on a steamer. Their luggage included multiple pets and an early motion picture device called an animatoscope. Hitchcock climbed Skagway Pass on foot before the days of the railroad. She subsequently wrote the book, Two Women in the Klondike, which described this visit to the Yukon.

Hitchcock was so impressed with the mining and agricultural possibilities of the Yukon that she spread the knowledge she had gained through lectures, which added largely to funds for churches and hospitals. She returned to the north, where she staked more than 100 claims and because so deeply interested financially that she spent the greater part of five years there.

In 1904, Hitchcock organized and was president of The Entertainment Club, in New York City. She was also a Fellow of the National Geographic Society, as well as a member of the United Daughters of the Confederacy.

== Two Women in the Klondike ==
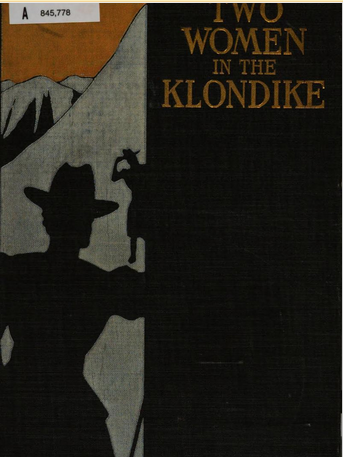
Two Women in the Klondike (1899 cover)

Two Women in the Klondike: The Story of a Journey to the Gold-Fields of Alaska (New York, G. P. Putnam's Sons, 1899) describes the adventures of Hitchcock and Edith Van Buren, a grandniece of President Martin Van Buren , during a perilous and eventful journey taken in the summer of 1898. Owing to the waters of the Yukon River being low, the two women were delayed for some time at Dawson City where they located miner's claims and lived as squatters. Besides the interesting incidents of travel included, the book included graphic descriptions of the Klondike region, and accounts of local customs and superstitions, as well as mining methods.

== Death ==
Mary Evelyn Hitchcock died April 6, 1920, and was buried at Oak Grove Cemetery, Fall River, Massachusetts.

== Selected works ==
- Two women in the Klondike : the story of a journey to the gold-fields of Alaska, 1899
- Tales out of school about naval officers (and others) by a woman who has lived on a man-of-war, 1908
- First reader : for use in the first year, 1912
- Second reader : for use in the second year, 1912
- Third reader, 1912
- Standard Catholic readers by grades. Third year, 1913
- Fifth reader : for use in the seventh and eighth years, 1913
- Life was like that, 1936
