= Edith Van Buren =

American socialite and traveler (1858–1914)

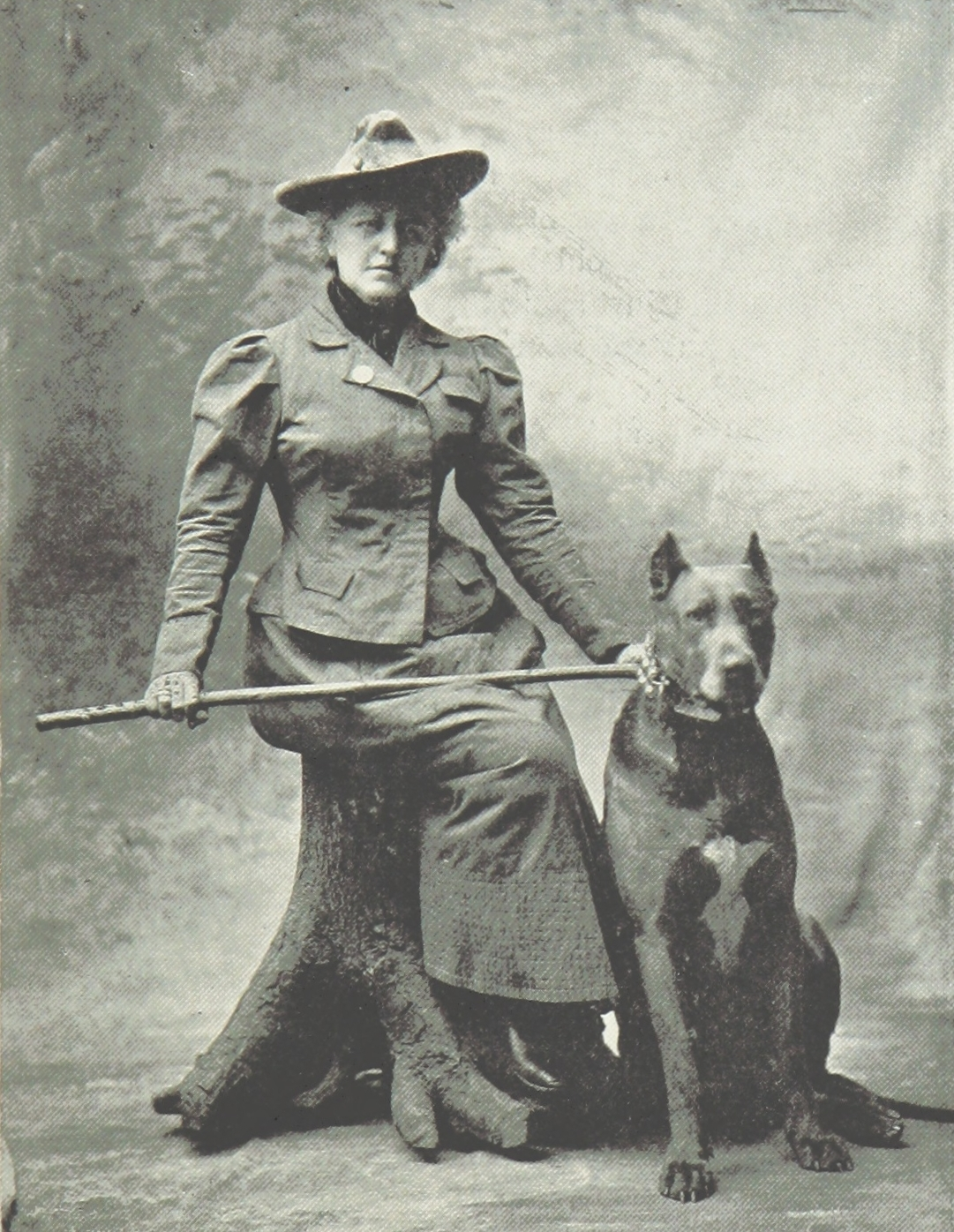
Van Buren in 1898

Edith Marie Van Buren (1858–1914), also known later in life as the Countess de Castelmenardo, was an American socialite and world traveler. She is remembered for her tourism in the Yukon, her contentious divorce from a man styling himself as the Count di Castelmenardo, and her family connection to Teaneck, New Jersey.

== Family ==
Edith Van Buren's father was General Thomas Brodhead Van Buren, a Union officer and U.S. diplomat who later became the U.S. Consul-General in Yokohama. Through her father, Edith Van Buren was related to the U.S. president Martin Van Buren. Her mother was Harriet Sheffield, daughter of the railroad magnate Joseph Earl Sheffield. Harriet Sheffield's brother-in-law, William Walter Phelps, encouraged the family to take up residence in Teaneck, New Jersey.

== Portrait bust ==
A marble portrait bust of Edith Van Buren by the American sculptor Luella Varney was exhibited at the 1893 Chicago World's Columbian Exhibition. One list of Varney's work described Van Buren as "the beauty." The bust is now on display at the Teaneck public library.

== Expedition to the Yukon ==
In 1898, Van Buren went to Klondike with her friend Mary Evelyn Hitchcock, embarking from San Francisco on a steamer. Their luggage included multiple pets and an early motion picture device called an animatoscope.

== Countess di Castelmenardo ==
Van Buren met Gennaro Vessicchio, also known as Gennaro di Castelmenardo, in Nice, France, where her brother Harold Sheffield Van Buren was a U.S. consul. Vessicchio represented himself as the count of Castelmenardo. The couple married in London on July 7, 1900. However, Vessicchio became indebted, losing money in Monte Carlo, and Van Buren learned that he was not actually a count. Wishing to legalise her married name and secure her status, she paid to procure her husband a genuine title of nobility, then learned that he was committing adultery. She had him jailed for adultery, then sued for separation and later divorce. Van Buren retained the title of Countess de Castelmenardo.

== See also ==
- List of American heiresses
