= Roswell Dwight Hitchcock =

American theologian and academic (1817–1887)

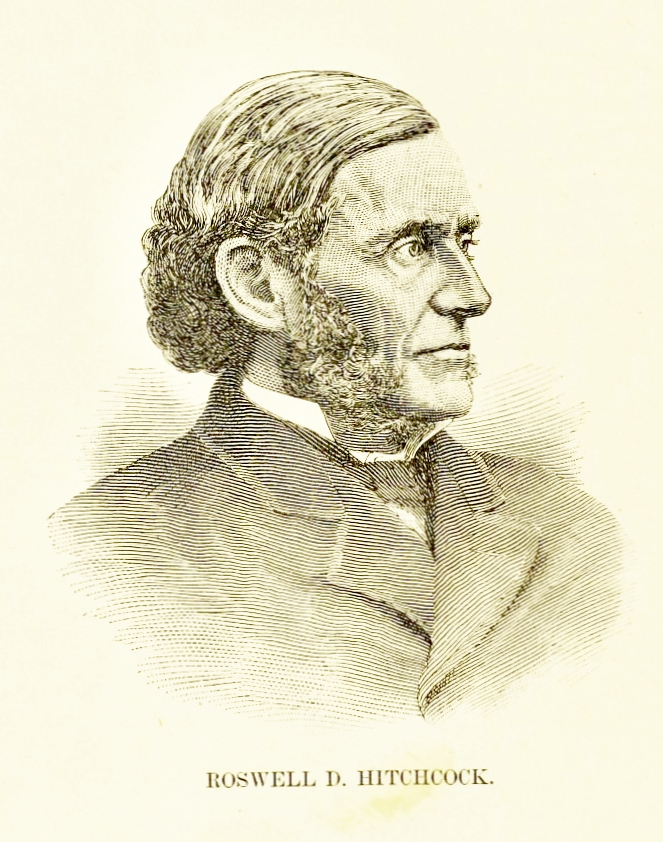

Roswell Dwight Hitchcock (August 15, 1817 – June 16, 1887) was a United States Congregationalist clergyman.

== Biography ==
He was born at East Machias, Maine. He graduated at Amherst College in 1836, and from the Andover Theological Seminary, Massachusetts, in 1838. He studied in Germany, at Halle and Berlin, in 1847. He was a tutor at Amherst in 1839–1842, and was minister of The Congregational Church in Exeter, Exeter, New Hampshire, in 1845–1852.

He became professor of natural and revealed religion in Bowdoin College, Brunswick, Maine, in 1852, and in 1855 professor of church history in the Union Theological Seminary in New York, of which he was president in 1880–1887. He died at Somerset, Massachusetts.

He was survived by a son, Commander Roswell D. Hitchcock, Jr. US Navy, who was married to the author and explorer, Mary Evelyn Hitchcock.

== Writings ==
Among his works are:

- Life of Edward Robinson (1863)
- Complete Analysis of the Holy Bible (1869)
- Hitchcock's Bible Names Dictionary (1869)
- Socialism (1879)
- Carmina Sanctorum (with Z. Eddy and L. W. Mudge, 1885)
- Eternal Atonement (1888)

== Testimonial ==
William Jewett Tucker gave him the following testimonial: "Of the men with whom I came into professional as well as personal relation, no one awakened or exerted so great an influence over me as Roswell D. Hitchcock...Dr. Hitchcock was a man of wide and genuine learning, but still more remarkable for his mental and spiritual insight. He saw religious truth in clear perspective and in just proportion. As a church historian, he knew and honored the historic Church, but he lived in the full freedom of the spirit. His independence could rise, if there was occasion, into courage. He was broadly and fearlessly progressive. Personally he was capable of sharing the riches of his mind and heart. His friendship had the reality and the charm of intimacy. Though several years my senior he never allowed the intervening years or the wisdom for which these stood, to create the slightest impression of conscious superiority. He was to me a most lovable man, not in spite of his great intellectual gifts, but because of them. I felt whenever I talked with him that I had access to the whole man. It was to me of great significance in the following years that this intimacy of personal friendship was in no sense dependent on frequent contact. The letters which came to me at Andover until his death bore the marks of the same rare and quickening friendship."
