= Hauteville Castle =

Castle in Saint-Légier-La Chiésaz, Switzerland

- Château d'Hauteville
- Saint-Légier-La Chiésaz in Switzerland
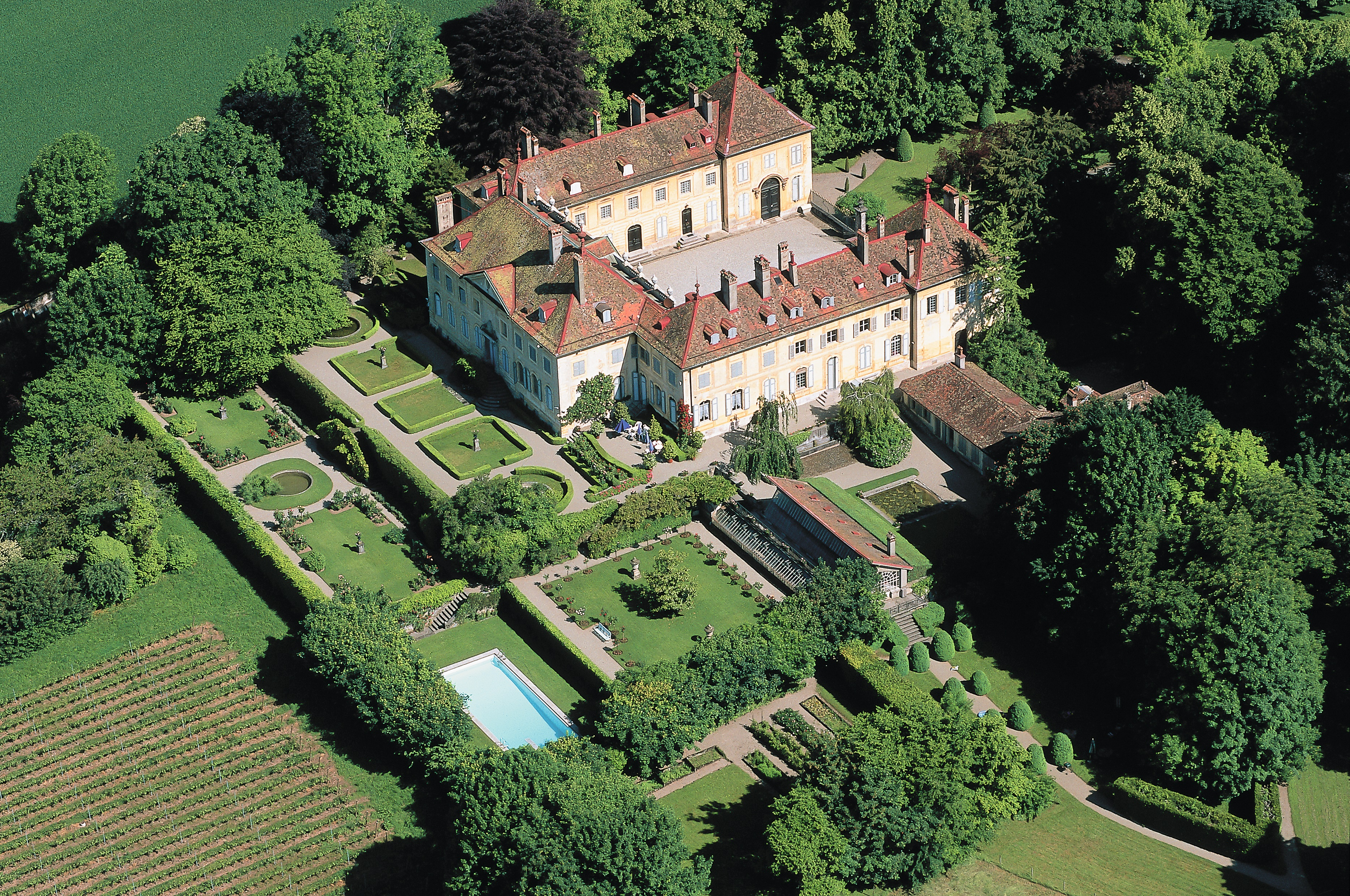
- Hauteville castle and surrounding gardens

Site information
- Type: Château
- Owner: Pepperdine University

Location
- Coordinates: 46°28′01″N 6°52′06″E

Site history
- Built: 1760

Swiss Cultural Property of National Significance

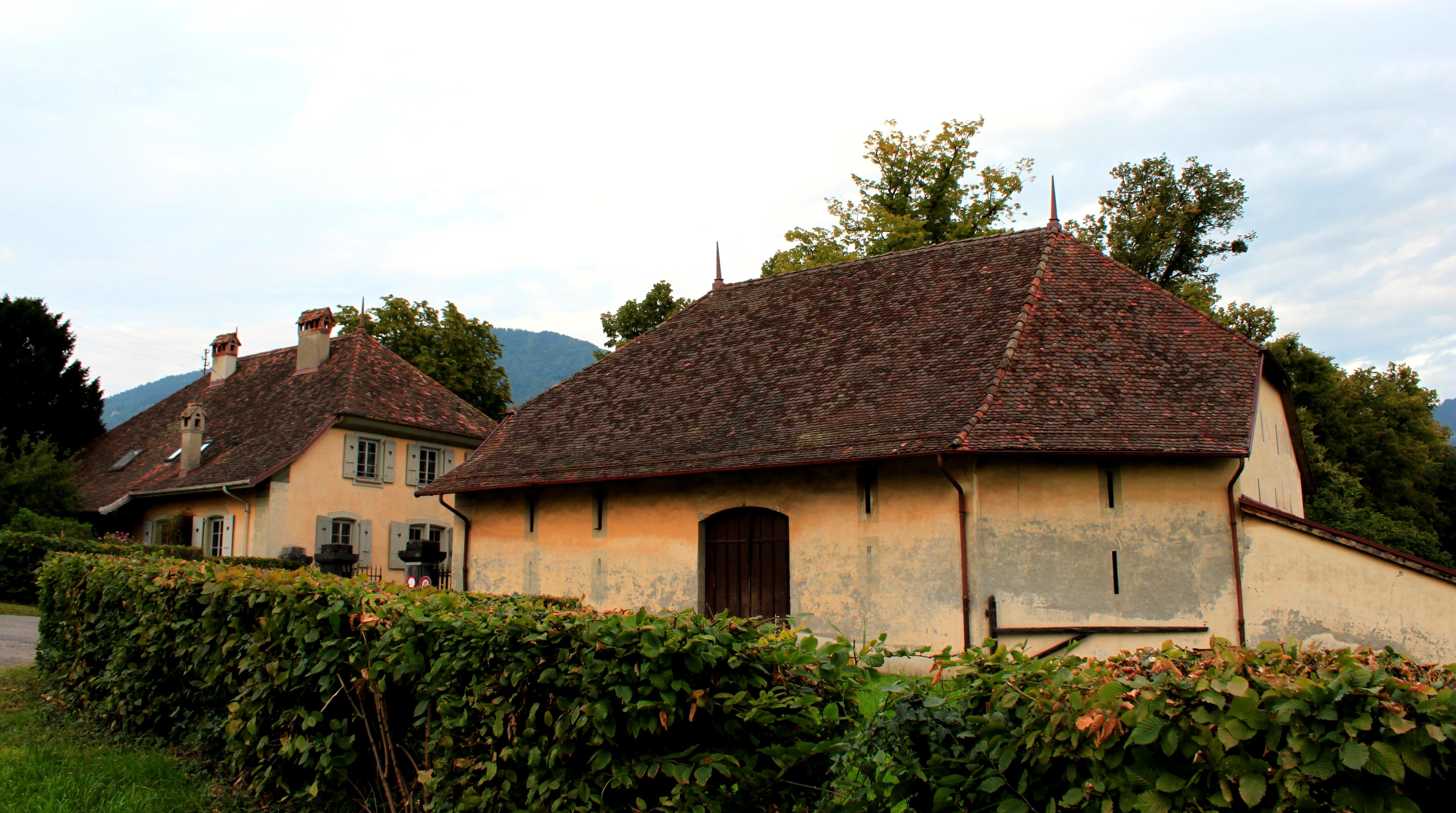
Outbuildings of Hauteville Castle

Hauteville Castle is a castle in the municipality of Saint-Légier-La Chiésaz of the Canton of Vaud in Switzerland. It is a Swiss heritage site of national significance.

== History ==
In 1733, Jacques-Philippe d'Herwarth acquired the lands that included the municipalities of Saint-Légier and La Chiésaz. He merged these lands with the estate in Hauteville, which he already owned. The castle was built on the estate in the 1760s.

Victoire Cannac, heiress of the castle, married Daniel Grand de la Chaise (1761–1828), from a family of Parisian bankers ennobled in 1781. She inherited the estate in 1794. It was then that the young couple decided to take the name of Grand d'Hauteville. The property remained in the family for the next 225 years.

In 2019, Pepperdine University purchased the castle and its 67 acres overlooking Lake Geneva, and after a multi-million euro renovation, the university plans to operate the estate as a global conference center and campus for its Switzerland-based study abroad program.

== See also ==
- List of castles in Switzerland
- Château
