= William de Ropp =

British engineer and double agent

Baron William Sylvester de Ropp
- Born: Sylvester Wilhelm Gotthard von der Ropp; 7 December 1886; Lithuania
- Died: 1973 (age 86); Herefordshire
- Alma mater: University of Birmingham
- Spouse(s): Ruth Fisher, Marie Woodman
- Children: Robert de Ropp; Ruth de Ropp
- Military career
- Branch: British Army; Royal Air Force
- Rank: Second Lieutenant
- Units: Wiltshire Regiment; 29 Sqdn Royal Flying Corps (World War I)

Baron William Sylvester de Ropp (born Sylvester Wilhelm Gotthard von der Ropp; 7 December 1886 – 1973) (Note: His Royal Air Force Service Record show a date of birth 7 December 1886) was a British agent involved in dealings with Nazi Germany before and during the Second World War. He was described as one of the most "mysterious and influential clandestine operators" of the era.

== Early life ==
De Ropp was born in Lithuania, the last child of Wilhelm Edmund Karl Reinhold Alexander Baron von der Ropp and his wife Lydia Gurjef. His father was from a family of Prussian barons and owned an estate called in Daudžgiriai, while his mother was a Cossack from the Crimea. De Ropp was educated in Dresden, Germany. He moved to England and, in 1908 enrolled at the University of Birmingham and became naturalised as a British subject in 1915. When he took the oath of allegiance on 25 January 1915, he was described as an electrical engineer of Kensington, London.

== Career ==
During the First World War, de Ropp served in the Royal Flying Corps under the command of F. W. Winterbotham. In the 1920s, de Ropp went to Berlin as a representative of the Bristol Aeroplane Company and became an associate of Alfred Rosenberg, a fellow Baltic German and a Nazi enthusiast. Rosenberg's function was to establish links with establishment figures in Britain for the Nazis. De Ropp had contacts with a powerful segment of the British upper class which favoured appeasement, known as the "Cliveden Set", and also with a member of the royal family, the Duke of Kent.

Through Rosenberg, de Ropp met Adolf Hitler and Rudolf Hess. According to Ladislas Farago, a close personal relationship developed between the Führer and de Ropp. Hitler used him as a confidential consultant on British affairs and outlined to him frankly his grandiose plans, described by one author as "a trust no other foreigner enjoyed to this extent". Lulled by this congenial atmosphere, the Luftwaffe naively gave away its secrets to the British. F. W. Winterbotham had become head of Air Intelligence, part of MI6, and nurtured de Ropp over three years. While the Nazis considered de Ropp one of their agents in England, his standing helped facilitate a visit by Winterbotham to Germany in 1934. Winterbotham met Rosenberg and Goering and obtained a considerable amount of information on the growth of the Luftwaffe.

== Family ==
De Ropp married Ruth Fisher and had a son, Robert, and a daughter named Ruth Marguerite. His wife died on 27 March 1919 in the 1918–19 influenza pandemic. In 1925 he married Marie Woodman. His son Robert de Ropp, with whom he maintained little contact, became a research biochemist and author on personal enlightenment.

== Death ==
De Ropp died in 1973 in Kington, Herefordshire. His second wife outlived him until 1986.
