= Wetherbee House (Waltham, Massachusetts) =

Historic house in Massachusetts, United States

- U.S. National Register of Historic Places
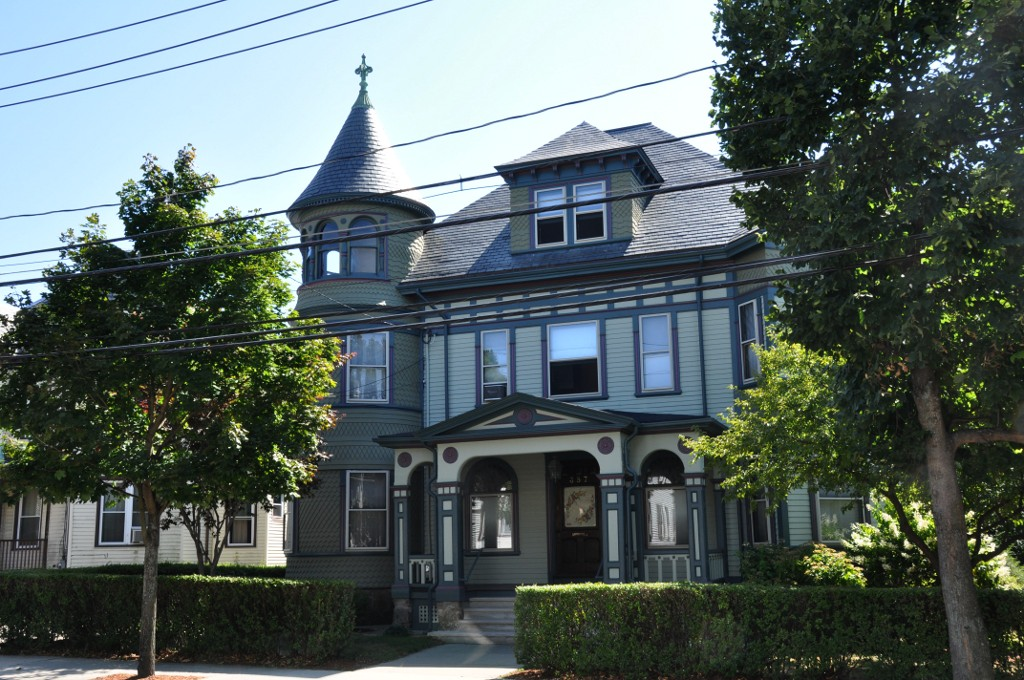

- Location within Massachusetts Location within the United States
- Location: 357 Crescent St., Waltham, Massachusetts
- Coordinates: 42°21′43″N 71°14′32″W
- Built: 1892
- Architect: George Strout
- Architectural style: Queen Anne
- MPS: Waltham MRA
- NRHP reference No.: 89001575
- Added to NRHP: September 28, 1989

The Wetherbee House is a historic house at 357 Crescent Street in Waltham, Massachusetts. It was built in 1892 by Frank W. Wetherbee, who at the time was the foreman of the Dial Department of the Waltham Watch Factory, and is one of the city's most elaborate Queen Anne Victorians. The house was added to the National Register of Historic Places in 1989.

In 1997, Robert and Juana Ham McDougall purchased the home after it had served as a fraternity house for college students as well as a boarding house for multiple tenants. Soon after purchasing the house, the McDougalls actively restored and renovated the home as it was in need of a great deal of attention. They replaced the wood flooring throughout the first floor with the exception of the oak flooring in the dining room. They completely remodeled the kitchen with all modern amenities but kept the original wainscoting and trim, keeping the charm and feel of the Victorian era alive. They completed restoration of the exterior of the house in 1998, including a five color paint scheme - 3 shades of green on the clapboards and shingles, blue porch ceilings and a cranberry accent to highlight the architectural details. The original stained glass panes that adorned the two front window archways and two oval side windows were missing from the home. Another home in Waltham, also designed by architect George Strout, retained its original stained glass. The McDougalls took photos of these and retained renowned custom stained glass maker Jim Anderson in Boston to replicate fine examples of what would have been originally installed in the home.

Many fine details inside the home remain original and intact, including its ornate fireplace and Anaglypta wallpaper in the dining room as well as the Lincrusta dado in the entry and along the internal staircase. The house was featured on the cable HGTV program "Restore America".

== See also ==
- National Register of Historic Places listings in Waltham, Massachusetts
