= Van den Heever =

Van den Heever is an Afrikaans surname. Notable people with the surname include:

- C. M. van den Heever (1902–1957), South African poet and writer
- Donovan van den Heever (born 1981) is a South African chess player
- Elza van den Heever (born 1979) South African soprano
- Louw van den Heever (born 1981) South African singer and songwriter
- F. P. 'Toon' van den Heever (1894–1956), South African poet and judge
- Gerhard van den Heever (born 1989), South African rugby union player
- Jennifer Van den Heever (born 1962) Namibian politician
- Leonora van den Heever (1926–2025), former judge of the High Court of South Africa.
- Martin van der Heever (born 1990) South African rugby union player
- Randall van den Heever (born 1950), South African politician
- Susan van den Heever, South African atmospheric scientist
