= Thierry, Prince de Hénin =

French politician

Thierry, Prince de Hénin Comte d'Alsace

Senator of France for Vosges
- In office 1909–1934 Serving with Jules Méline
- Preceded by: Paul Frogier de Ponlevoy
- Succeeded by: André Barbier

Personal details
- Born: Thierry-Arno-Baudoin-Philippe de Hénin-Liétard; 5 August 1853 The Hague, Netherlands
- Died: 24 February 1934 (aged 80) Paris, France
- Party: Republican
- Spouse: Charlotte Gabrielle de Ganay (after 1884)
- Awards: Legion of Honor; Croix de guerre

Thierry-Arno-Baudoin-Philippe de Hénin-Liétard, Prince de Hénin and Comte d'Alsace (5 August 1853 – 24 February 1934) was a French politician and soldier.

== Early life ==
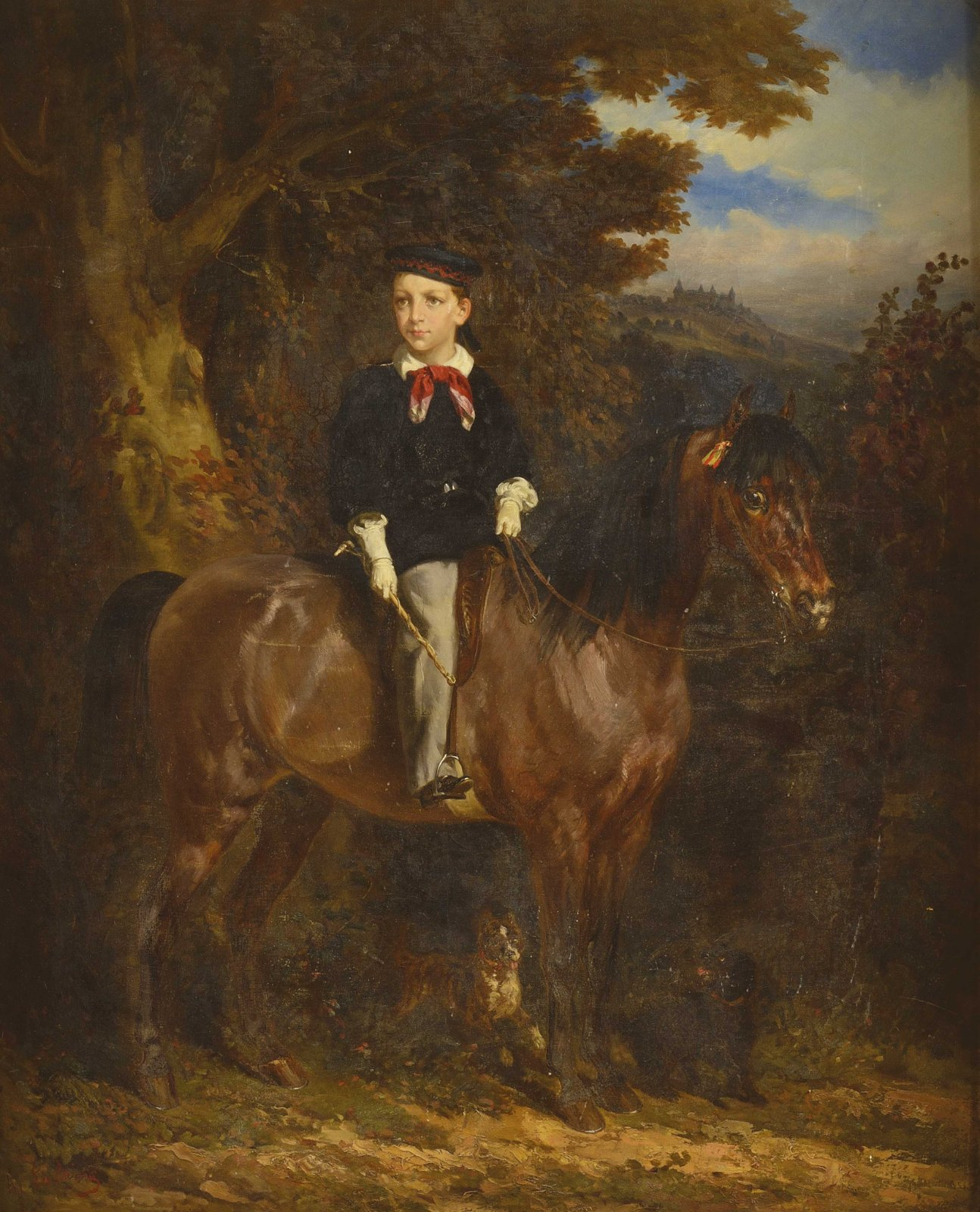
Portrait of Thierry as a child with his horse, by François Hippolyte Lalaisse.

Thierry-Arno-Baudoin-Philippe was born into the House of Hénin on 5 August 1853 in The Hague in the Netherlands. A hereditary prince of the Holy Roman Empire, he was a son of Simon-Gérard d'Alsace de Hénin-Liétard (1832–1891) and Baroness Angélique van Brienen de Groote Lindt (1833–1921). His younger brother was Philippe-Charles de Hénin-Liétard (who married Hélène-Marie-Éléonore van Brienen de Groote Lindt).

His paternal grandfather was Pierre-Simon de Hénin-Liétard, a son of Jean-François-Joseph de Hénin-Liétard, chamberlain of Joseph II, the Holy Roman Emperor from 1765 to 1790 (and brother of Queen Marie Antoinette). His great-grandfather was the uncle of Prince Charles-Alexandre de Hénin-Liétard d'Alsace, who was executed by guillotine during the French Revolution.

== Career ==
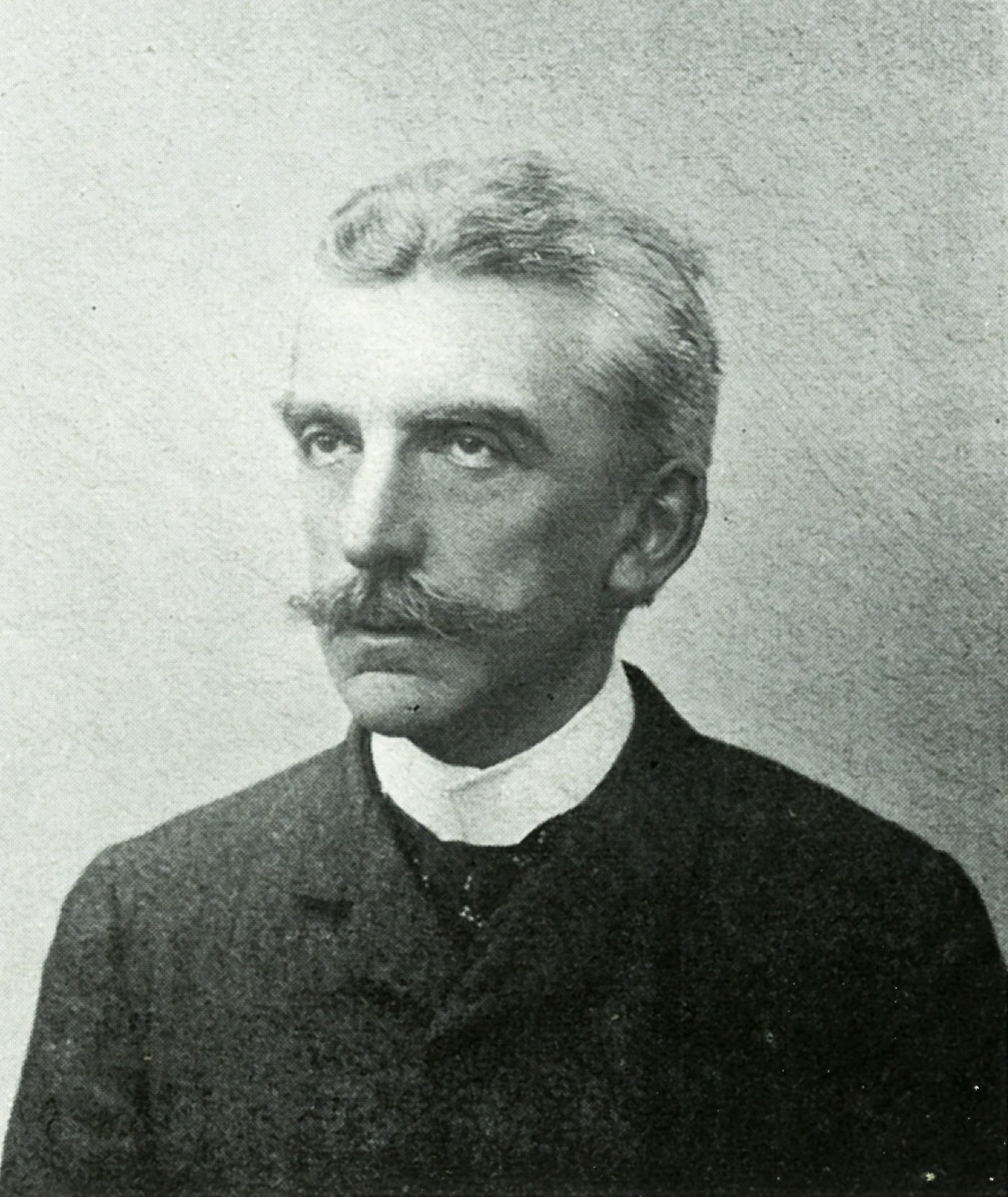
Thierry Hénin-Alsace

The Comte d'Alsace began his career at 20 years old by enlisting in the cavalry of the Army of Africa, a part of the French Army. He spent ten years in campaigns in southern Algeria and southern Tunisia from 1873 to 1883. He earned his officer's stripes and, later, was noticed by General Gaston, Marquis de Galliffet, and was promoted to orderly officer. He took part in the famous cavalry charge of the Chasseurs d'Afrique at Sedan.

After his father's death in 1891, he became the 3rd Prince of Hénin (created 1828), 7th Marquis of Alsace (created c. 1720), 4th Count of Alsace (created 1810). He resigned from the military to take care of his estates in Vosges, Lorraine, including the Château de Bourlémont in Frebécourt. The Château had been acquired by his great-grandfather in 1769 from the Bauffremont family. At Bourlémont, d'Hénin hosted many notables, including Prime Minister Georges Clemenceau.

=== Political career ===
He served as Mayor of Frebécourt from 1894 until his death as well as General Councilor of Vosges in the Canton of Neufchâteau from 1892 until his death. In the 1893 legislative election, he received 5,627 votes but failed to be elected to the Chamber of Deputies, the legislative assembly of the French Parliament during the French Third Republic. After the election of Paul Frogier de Ponlevoy to the Senate, he ran again as a Republican candidate and was elected 20 May 1894 by 7,359 votes against 6,009 votes for M. Boussu. He ran unopposed in 1898 and was reelected by 10,336 votes. In November 1898, he was appointed member of the army commission. He was reelected again on 27 April 1902 by 10,091 votes to 116 votes for the radical Dr. Schneider. He was again elected in 1906, serving until 3 January 1909.

On 3 January 1909, he was elected to the Senate of France. The Senate was composed of 300 members, 225 of whom were elected by the departments and colonies and 75 that were elected by the National Assembly. While serving as Senator for Vosges, he served alongside former Prime Minister Jules Méline representing Vosges. He was re-elected 11 January 1920 and on 9 January 1927, serving until his death on 24 February 1934. In the Senate, he devoted his attention to military matters and returned to service, with the rank of Squadron Chief, when World War I started.

He was made Officier de la Légion d'honneur and was awarded the Croix de guerre for his efforts in the War.

== Personal life ==
On 19 April 1884, he was married to Charlotte Gabrielle de Ganay (1864–1942) in Paris. She was a daughter of Etienne, Marquis de Ganay and his wife, the American heiress, Emily Ridgway (a granddaughter of merchant Jacob Ridgway). Her paternal grandfather was Charles-Alexandre, Marquis de Ganay. Her brother, Jean, Marquis de Ganay, was married to salonnière Berthe, Countess de Béhague and their son, Count Bernard de Ganay, married Magdeleine Goüin.

The Prince d'Hénin died, without issue, at his home, 20 Rue Washington, Paris on 24 February 1934. As he had no direct heir, he bequeathed the Château de Bourlémont to Count Jacques de Rohan-Chabot (1889–1958), the husband of his niece, Nicole Hélène de Hénin-Liétard (1892–1958).
