= Charles-Alexandre, Marquis de Ganay =

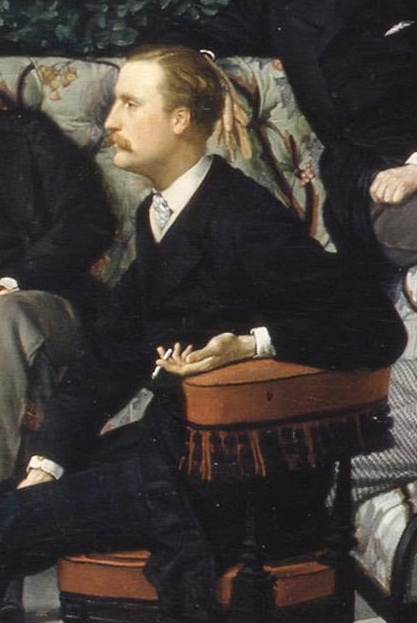
Portrait of the Marquis de Ganay, by James Tissot, 1868.

Charles-Alexandre de Ganay, 3rd Marquis de Ganay (29 April 1803 – 4 January 1881) was a French aristocrat, diplomat and art collector.

== Early life ==
Charles-Alexandre was born on 29 April 1803 in Saône-et-Loire in Burgundy, France. He was the only son of Françoise Bonne de Virieu (1776–1870) and Gen. Antoine-Charles de Ganay, 2nd Marquis de Ganay (1769–1849), a representative for Saône-et-Loire from 1810 to 1823.

His paternal grandfather was the Governor of Autun, Paul-Louis, 1st Marquis de Ganay (son of Nicolas, seigneur de Virigneux who was raised to the nobility in 1739) and was married to Ana Marie Thérèse Gravier de Vergennes (a niece of Charles Gravier, comte de Vergennes, the Chief Minister of the French Monarch under King Louis XVI). They owned the Château de Visigneux. His maternal grandparents were Nicolas de Virieu de Beauvoir, Vicomte de Virieu, and Claudine de Maleteste, Vicomtesse de Virieu.

== Career ==
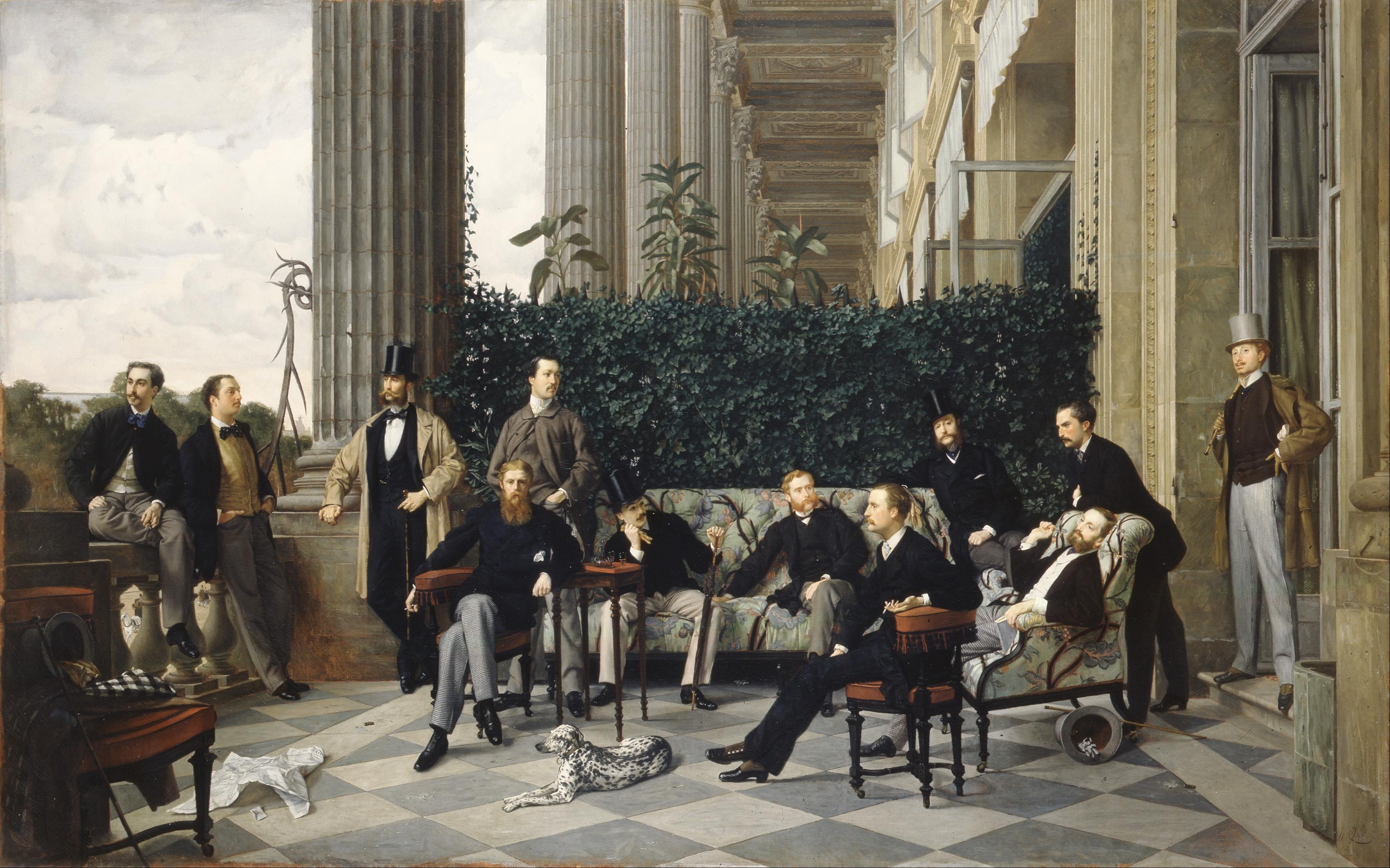
The Circle of the Rue Royale, by James Tissot, 1868.

A diplomat, he served as Minister Plenipotentiary to the Grand Duchy of Tuscany in Italy. The United Provinces of Central Italy, a client state of the Kingdom of Sardinia, annexed Tuscany in 1859. Tuscany was formally annexed to Sardinia in 1860, as a part of the unification of Italy resulting in the Kingdom of Italy in 1861.

After his father-in-law's death, his wife inherited the Château de Luins in the Swiss Canton of Vaud.

Ganay, and his son Etienne were both featured in James Tissot's 1868 group portrait painting The Circle of the Rue Royale. The painting depicted the gathering of the Circle of the Rue Royale, a male club founded in 1852 who commissioned the work, and takes place on one of the balconies of the Hôtel de Coislin, overlooking the Place de la Concorde. Each of the twelve subjects paid 1,000 francs for the painting to be made. Others in the painting included Gaston, Marquis de Galliffet (known as an opponent to the 1871 Paris Commune), Prince Edmond de Polignac, the Comte Julien de Rochechouart, the Marquis René de Miramon, Baron Gaston de Saint-Maurice, Capt. Coleraine Vansittart, Baron Rodolphe Hottinguer, Marquis Alfred du Lau d'Allemans, Comte Alfred de La Tour-Maubourg, Charles Haas (who was a source for the character of Charles Swann in Marcel Proust's Remembrance of Things Past).

== Personal life ==
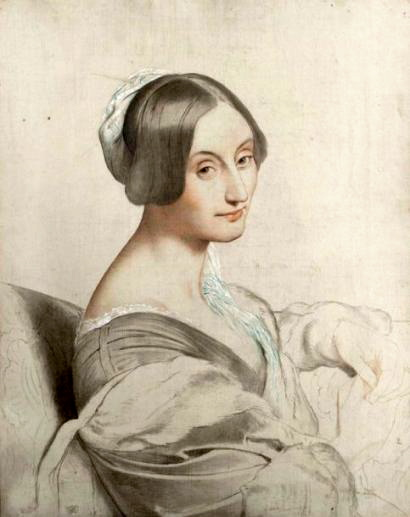
Portrait of his wife, Élisa, c. 1830.

In 1831, the Marquis de Ganay was married to Élisa Calixte de Pourtalès (1810–1877), a daughter of Count James-Alexandre de Pourtalès, a prominent banker and art collector who served as chamberlain to the King of Prussia Frederick William III. Together, they were the parents of:

- Louis Charles Maurice, 4th Marquis de Ganay (c. 1832–1893), who married Mathilde des Acres de l'Aigle, a daughter of Henri des Acres de L'Aigle, Comte de L'Aigle and a direct descendant of the French King Louis XV through his illegitimate son Charles de Vintimille.
- Etienne Aimé, 5th Marquis de Ganay (1833–1903), who married the American heiress Emily Ridgway (1838–1921), a daughter of John Jacob Ridgway of Philadelphia, Pennsylvania, and friend of writer Edith Wharton. Her aunt, Susanna Ridgway, a daughter of merchant Jacob Ridgway, was the second wife of Dr. John Rhea Barton. They bought the Château de Courances in 1895.
- Jacques de Ganay (1843–1899), who married Renée de Maillé de La Tour-Landry, the third daughter of Jaquelin Armand Charles, Duc de Maillé (son of the Duke and Duchess of Maillé) and his wife Jeanne d'Osmond (daughter of Gen. Rainulphe d'Osmond).

His wife died in 1877. The Marquis de Ganay died on 4 January 1881 in Piedmont, Italy. After his death, a catalog featuring some of his rare and precious books, manuscripts and prints, was compiled and published in Paris.

=== Descendants ===
Through his eldest son, he was a grandfather of Marianne-Constance de Ganay (1860–1931), who never married, instead, becoming a nun and writer (who won the Prix Juteau-Duvigneaux from the Académie Française in 1914).

Through his second son Etienne, he was a grandfather of Marguerite de Ganay (1859–1940), wife of Arthur O'Connor (a grandson of Arthur O'Connor, an Irish general in Napoleon's army, and the great-grandson of the Marquis de Condorcet); Charles Aimé Jean, 6th Marquis de Ganay (1861–1948), husband of salonnière Berthe, Countess de Béhague (their son, Count Bernard de Ganay, married Magdeleine Goüin); Jacques André de Ganay, Count de Ganay (1863–1912), husband of Jeanne le Marois; Charlotte Gabrielle de Ganay, wife of Thierry, Prince d'Hénin, and Gérard de Ganay, husband of Zélie Schneider.

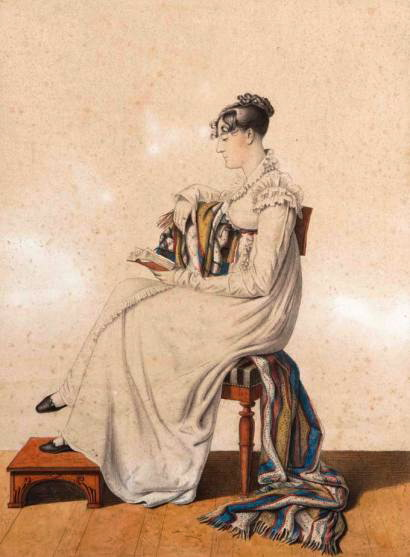
His mother, Françoise, Marquise de Ganay

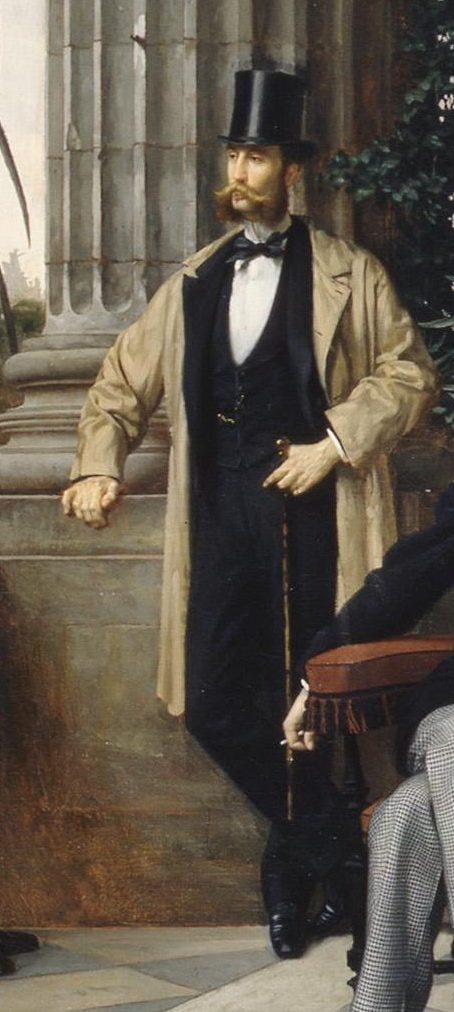
His second son, then Comte Etienne de Ganay, by James Tissot, 1868.

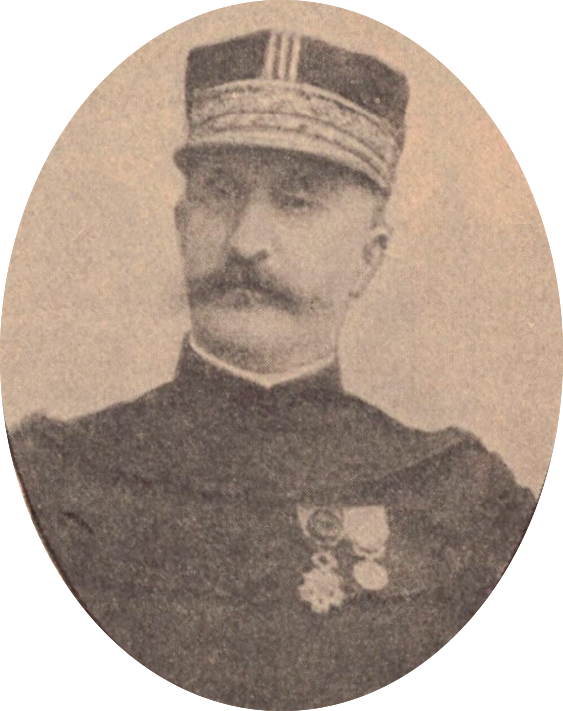
Photograph of his youngest son, Général Jacques de Ganay.

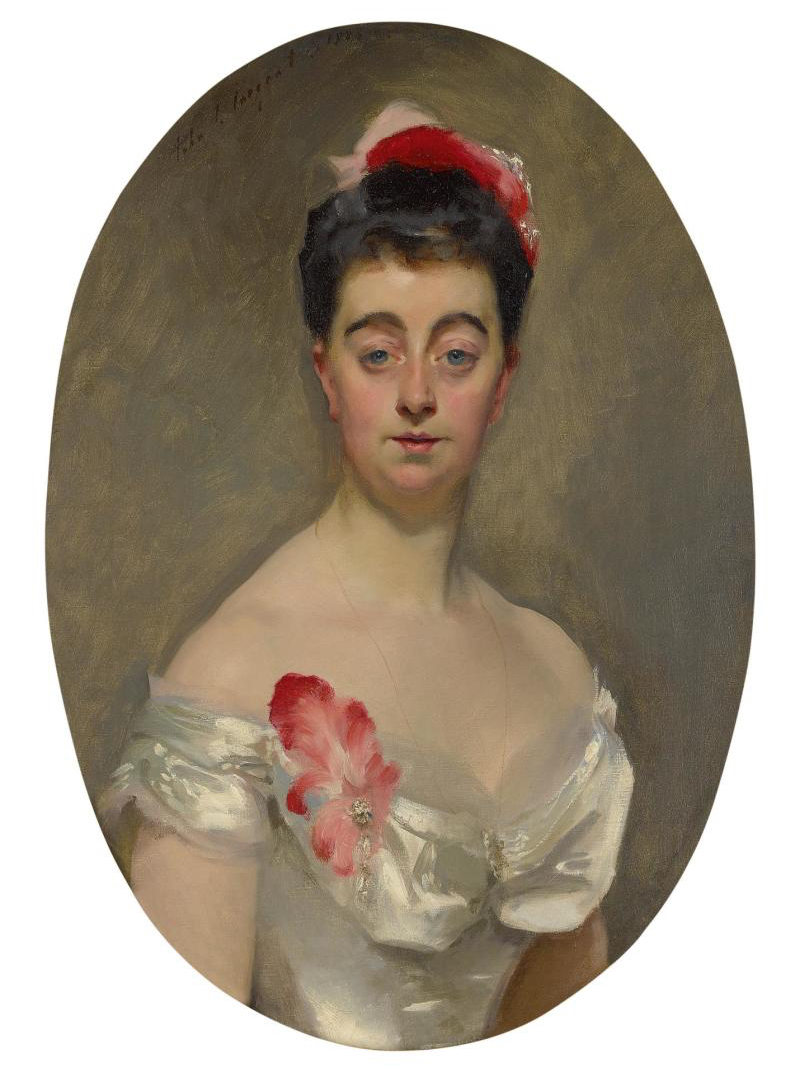
Portrait of his daughter-in-law, Renée, the Countess de Ganay, by John Singer Sargent, 1885.

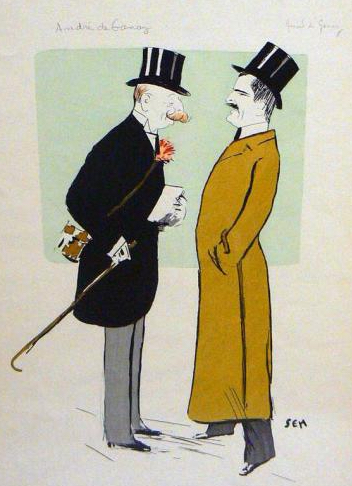
Illustration of his grandson, André and Gérard de Ganay, by Georges Goursat

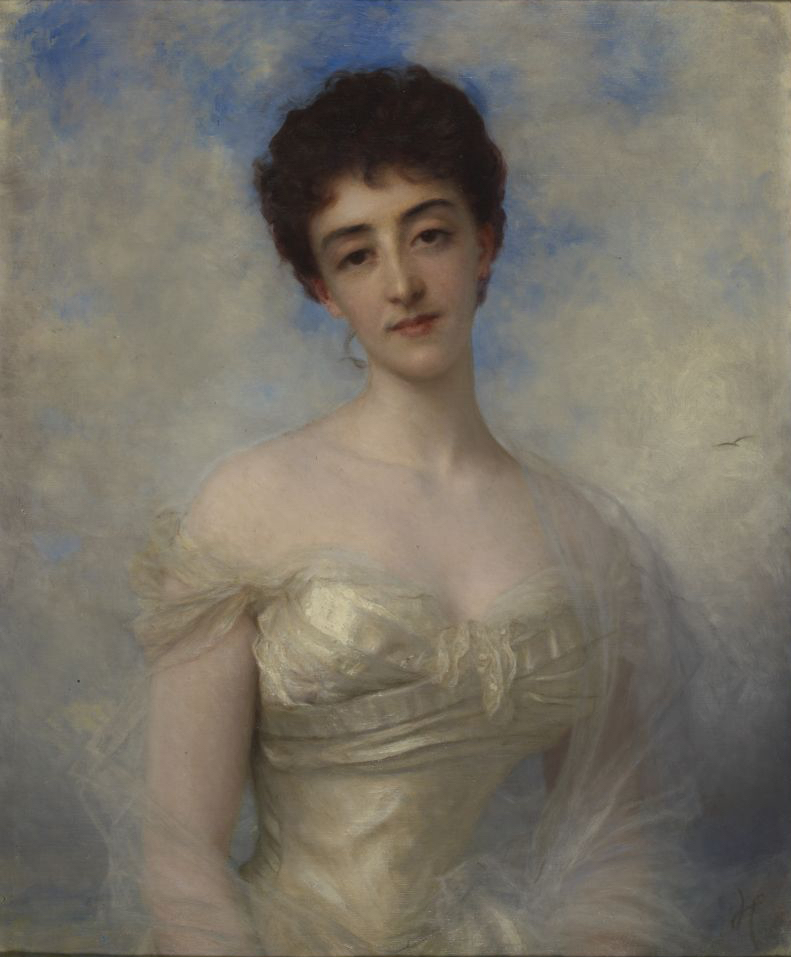
The Comtesse Gérard de Ganay (née Lily Schneider), wife of his grandson, by Ernest Hébert 1895.

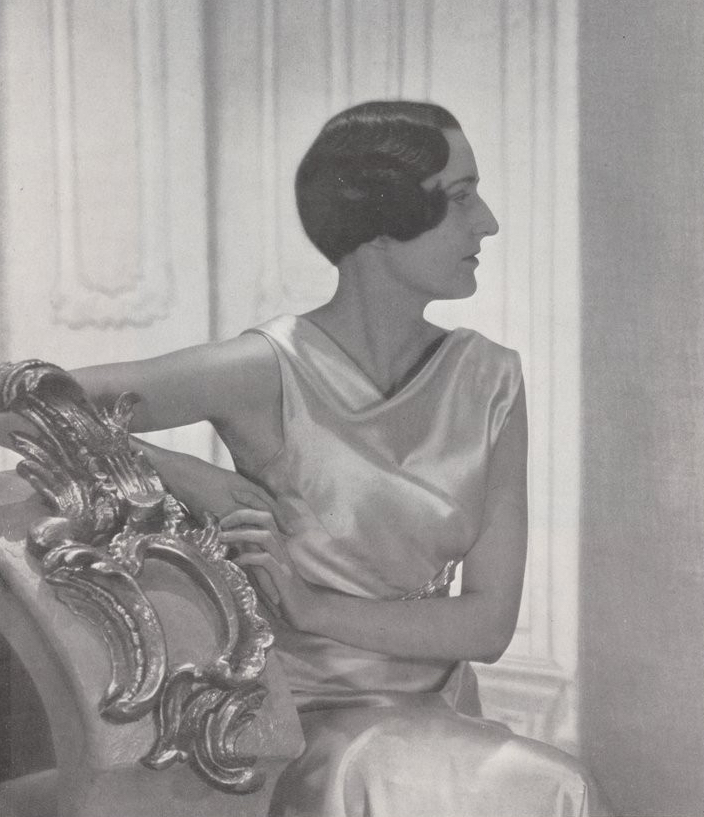
His great-granddaughter, Solange de Ganay, Comtesse Charles de Breteuil, 1932.
