= Etienne, Marquis de Ganay =

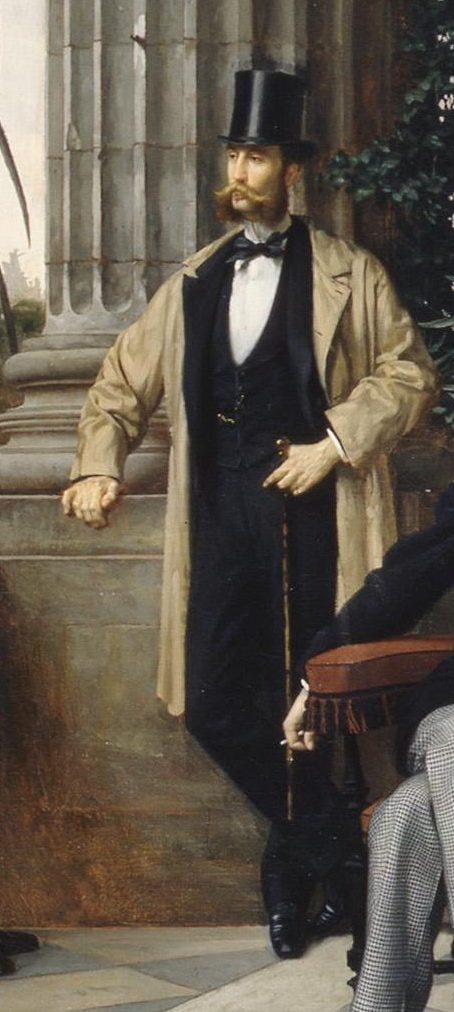
The Marquis de Ganay in 1868 when he was the Comte Etienne de Ganay, by James Tissot.

Etienne Aimé de Ganay, 5th Marquis de Ganay (22 October 1833 – 1903) was a French aristocrat and art collector.

== Early life ==
He was a son of Charles-Alexandre, Marquis de Ganay (1803–1881) and Élisa Calixte de Pourtalès (1810–1877), who inherited the Château de Luins in the Swiss Canton of Vaud. His elder brother, Louis Charles Maurice, was the 4th Marquis de Ganay and married Mathilde des Acres de l'Aigle (a direct descendant of the King Louis XV through his illegitimate son Charles de Vintimille); His younger brother, Jacques de Ganay, married Renée de Maillé de La Tour-Landry (a granddaughter of the Duke and Duchess of Maillé and Gen. Rainulphe d'Osmond).

His maternal grandfather was Count James-Alexandre de Pourtalès, a prominent banker and art collector who served as chamberlain to King Frederick William III of Prussia. His paternal grandparents were Françoise Bonne de Virieu and Gen. Antoine-Charles de Ganay, 2nd Marquis de Ganay, a representative for Saône-et-Loire from 1810 to 1823.

== Career ==
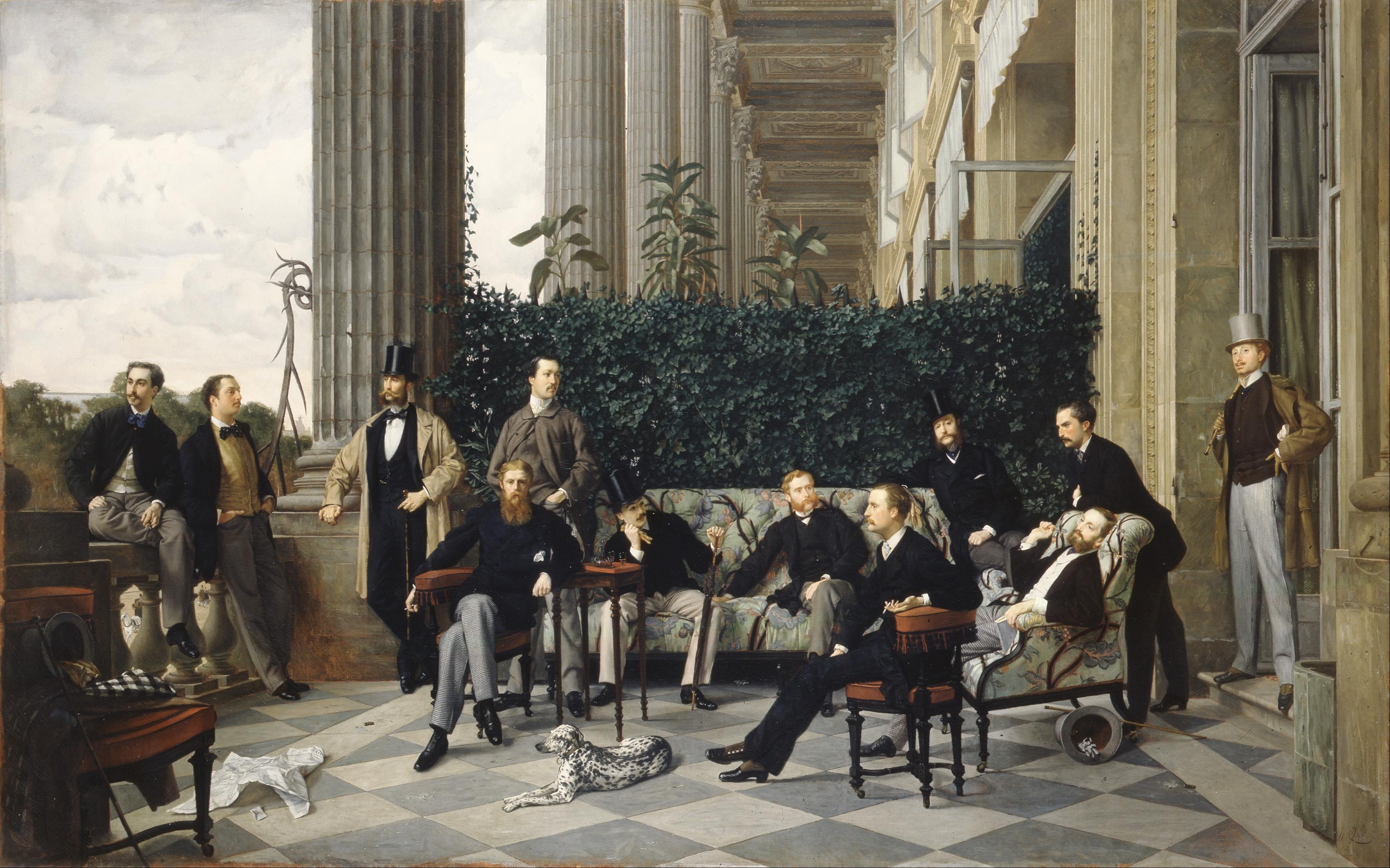
The Circle of the Rue Royale, by James Tissot, 1868.

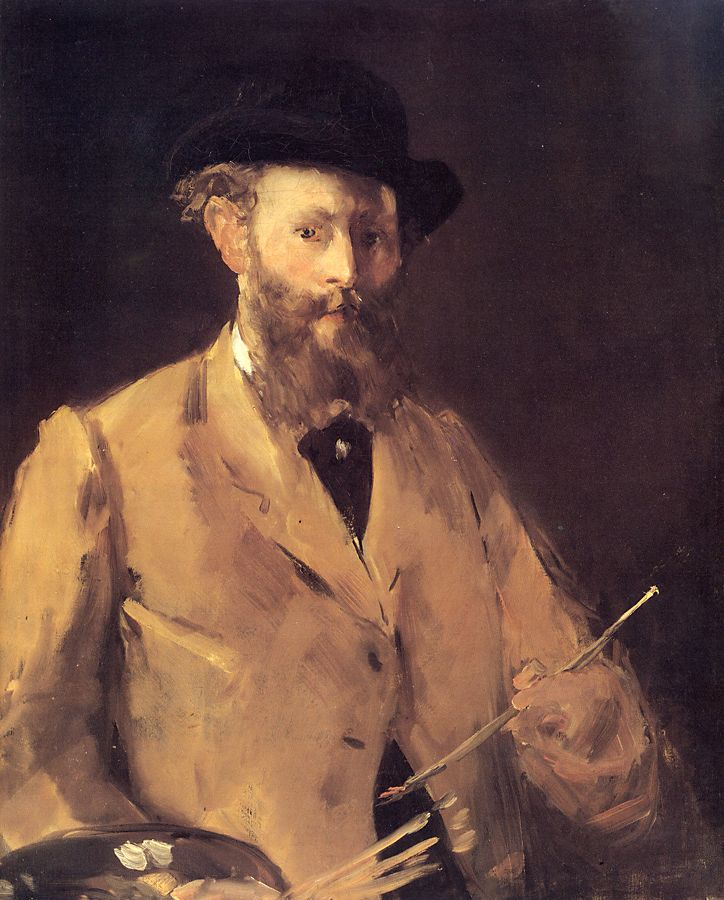
Self-Portrait with Palette by Édouard Manet, 1879

Ganay, and his elder brother were both featured in James Tissot's 1868 group portrait painting The Circle of the Rue Royale. The painting depicted the gathering of the Circle of the Rue Royale, a male club founded in 1852 who commissioned the work, and takes place on one of the balconies of the Hôtel de Coislin, overlooking the Place de la Concorde. Each of the twelve subjects paid 1,000 francs for the painting to be made. Others in the painting included Gaston, Marquis de Galliffet (known as an opponent to the 1871 Paris Commune), Prince Edmond de Polignac, the Comte Julien de Rochechouart, the Marquis René de Miramon, Baron Gaston de Saint-Maurice, Capt. Coleraine Vansittart, Baron Rodolphe Hottinguer, Marquis Alfred du Lau d'Allemans, Comte Alfred de La Tour-Maubourg, Charles Haas (who was a source for the character of Charles Swann in Marcel Proust's Remembrance of Things Past).

In 1893, he became the 5th Marquis of Ganay following the death of his elder brother who died without male issue. Like his father and grandfather before him (who owned the famous Comte de Pourtalès Collection which was auctioned off in 1865), he was an art collector. In May 1910, his widow acquired Édouard Manet's 1879 Self-Portrait with Palette from the estate of Suzanne Manet, the artist's widow who had died in 1906. His heirs sold the painting to Jakob Goldschmidt in 1931.

The captain of La Korrigane, de Ganay also served as president of the Yacht Club de France, the oldest nautical club in France, and one of the most important yacht clubs in the world.

== Personal life ==
In 1858, he was married to the American heiress and fellow art collector, Emily Ridgway (1838–1921). She was a daughter of John Jacob Ridgway of Philadelphia, Pennsylvania and friend of writer Edith Wharton. Her aunt, Susanna Ridgway, a daughter of merchant Jacob Ridgway, was the second wife of Dr. John Rhea Barton. They bought the Château de Courances in 1895. Together, Ganay and his wife were the parents of:

- Marguerite de Ganay (1859–1940), who married Arthur O'Connor, a grandson of Arthur O'Connor (an Irish general in Napoleon's army), and the great-grandson of the Marquis de Condorcet.
- Charles Aimé Jean, 6th Marquis de Ganay (1861–1948), who married salonnière Berthe, Countess de Béhague He owned a copy of Salvator Mundi a painting thought to be by Leonardo da Vinci.
- Jacques André de Ganay, Count de Ganay (1863–1912), who married Jeanne le Marois (1870–1961), a daughter of Jean Polydor le Marois.
- Charlotte Gabrielle de Ganay (1864–1942), who married Thierry, Prince d'Hénin, a Senator of France for Vosges from 1909 to 1934.
- Gérard de Ganay (1869–1925), who married Zélie "Lily" Schneider (1872–1969).

The Marquis de Ganay died in 1903 and was succeeded by his eldest son, Jean who became the 6th Marquis de Ganay.

=== Descendants ===
Through his son Jean, he was a grandfather of Count Bernard de Ganay, who married Magdeleine Goüin.

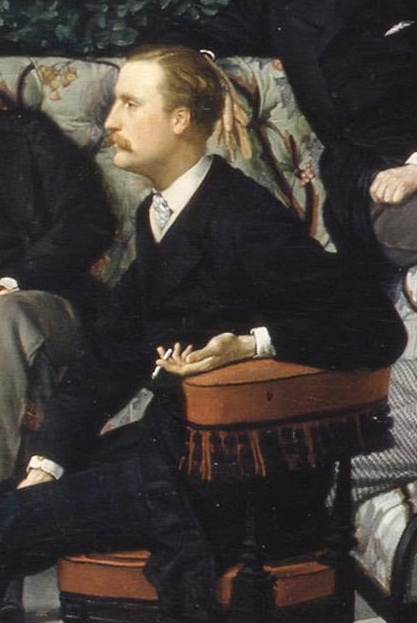
His elder brother, Louis Charles Maurice, 4th Marquis de Ganay, by James Tissot, 1868.

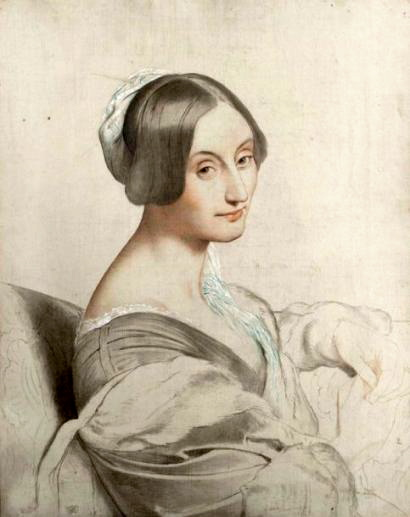
Portrait of his mother, Élisa, c. 1830.

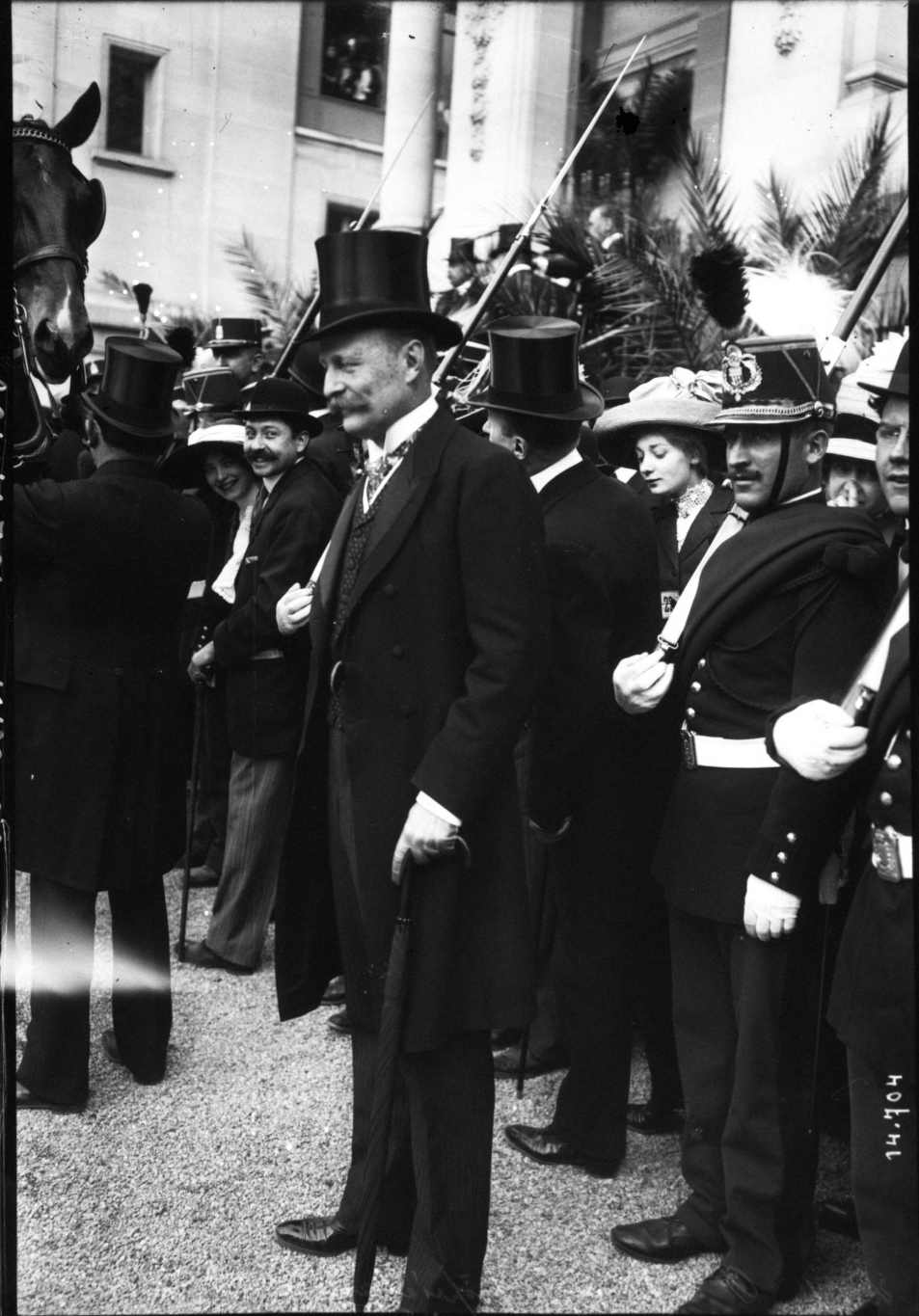
Photograph of his son, Jean de Ganay, 1911.

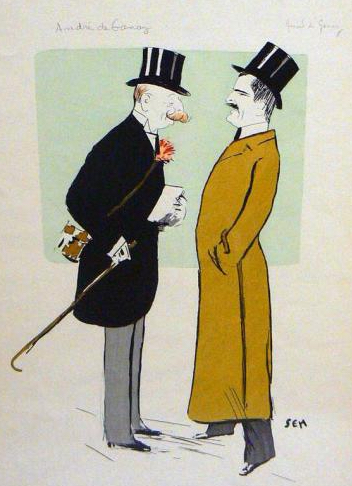
Illustration of his sons, André and Gérard de Ganay, by Georges Goursat.

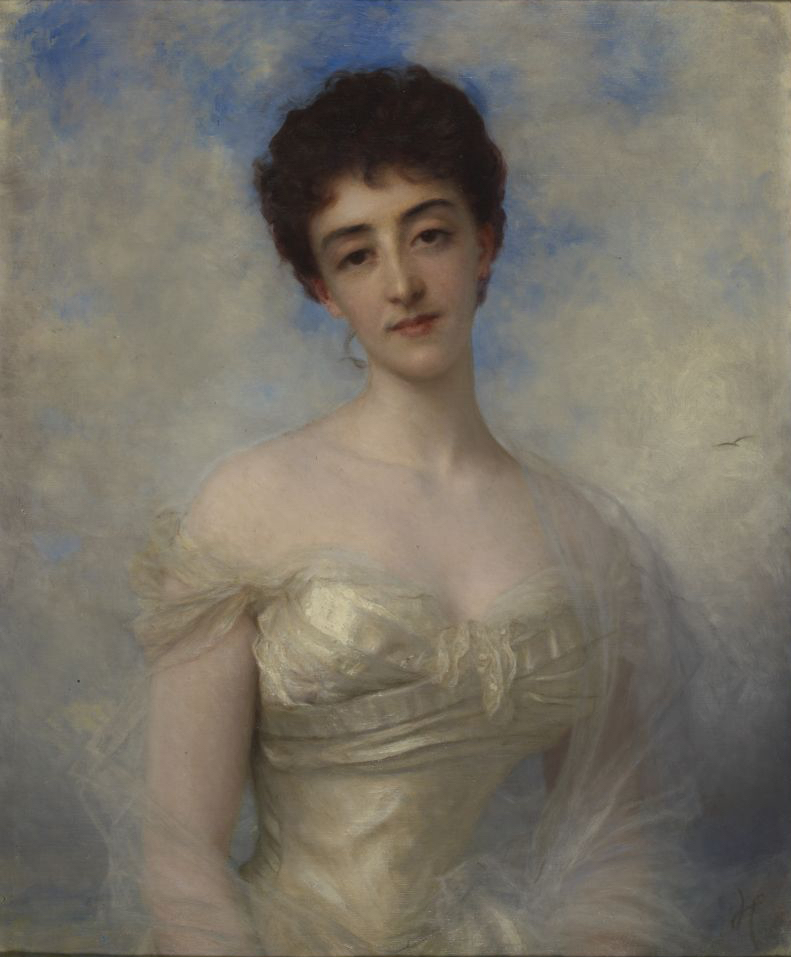
The Comtesse Gérard de Ganay (née Lily Schneider), his daughter-in-law, by Ernest Hébert 1895.

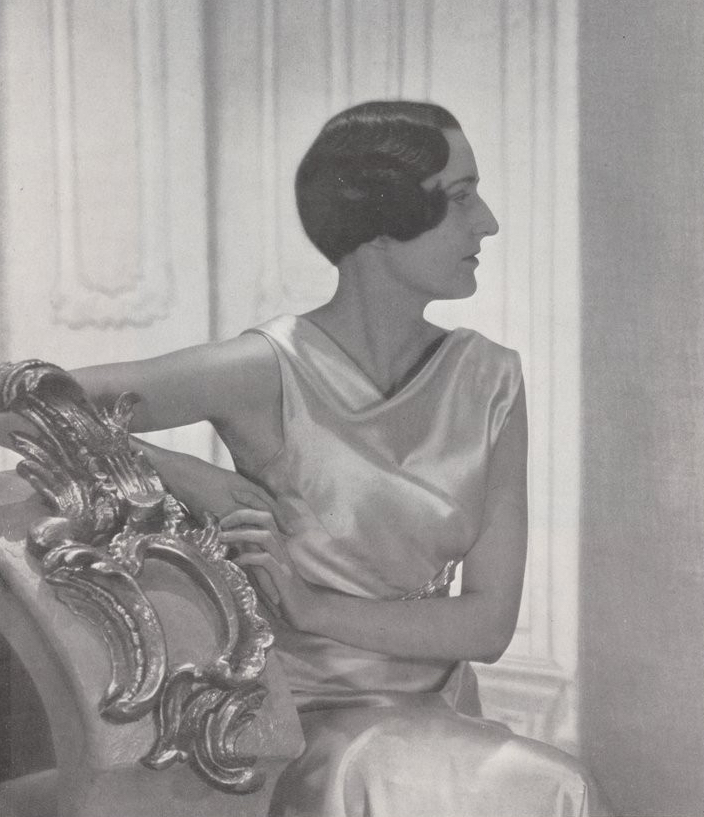
His granddaughter, Solange de Ganay, Comtesse Charles de Breteuil, 1932.
