= Phoebe Ann Rush =

American socialite (1799–1857)

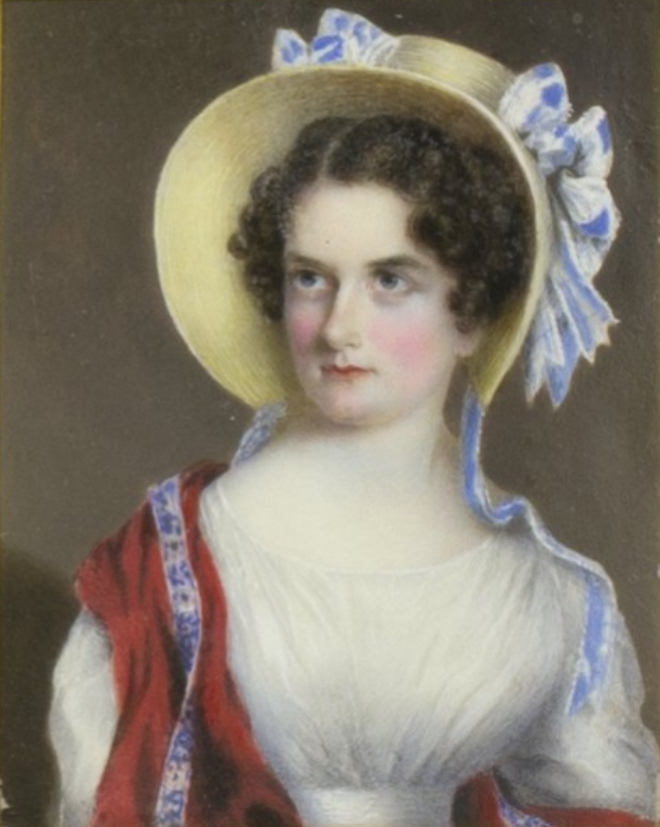
Portrait by Anna Claypoole Peale, c. 1829

Phoebe Ann Rush (née Ridgway; 1797/9–1857), often called "Madam Rush" after her marriage, was an American socialite and literary hostess.

== Life ==
Mary Ann Ridgeway, a daughter of Jacob Ridgway, was born in Philadelphia in either 1797 or 1799. She was highly educated in early life, well versed in the languages and literature of modern Europe, and by her social tact and conversational powers became one of the noted American women of her time. Her house in Philadelphia has been called one of the finest in the United States, and her entertainments were on a large and luxurious scale.

=== Personal life ===
Her husband, James Rush, was a son of Benjamin Rush.

== Sources ==
- IImhof, Bob (June 9, 2017). "Narrative of Phoebe Ann Ridgway Rush – Daughter of Jacob Ridgway". Biddle, Gertrude Bosler; Lowrie, Sarah Dickinson (eds.). Pennsylvania Great Outdoors Visitors Bureau. Retrieved 17 August 2022.
- Jones, Charles Kelley (2006). Francis Johnson (1792–1844): Chronicle of a Black Musician in Early Nineteenth-Century Philadelphia. Bethlehem, PA: Lehigh University Press. pp. 57–60.
- Krusen, Wilmer (1942). "Ann Ridgway Rush (1799–1857)". Notable Women of Pennsylvania. Philadelphia, PA: University of Pennsylvania Press. pp. 131–132.

Attribution:
