= Automobile Club féminin de France =

French women-only automobile club

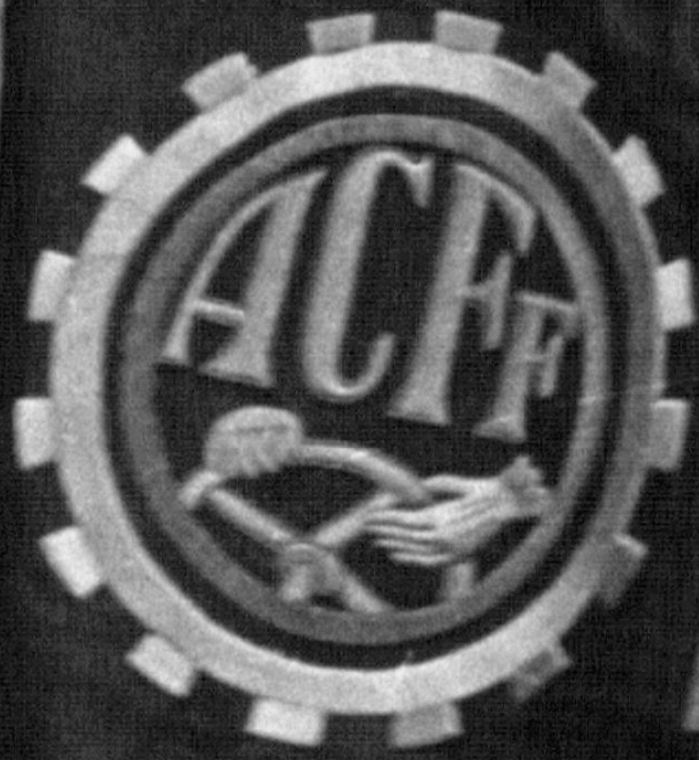
- Abbreviation: ACFF
- Formation: 1926
- Founder: Anne de Rochechouart de Mortemart
- Founded at: Paris

The Automobile Club féminin de France (ACFF) was a French women-only automobile club founded in 1926.

== History ==
The Automobile Club féminin de France was founded in 1926 by Anne de Rochechouart de Mortemart, the sporting Duchess of Uzès and the first woman in France to earn a driving licence, in 1898. The ACFF was set up to be the female equivalent of the Automobile Club de France (ACF) as the ACF did not allow women to join their organisation. At the same time, the Duchess of Uzès created the official publication for the club, the Revue de l'Automobile Club féminin, which was published for 14 years.

The ACFF's membership were very well off, as motoring in the 1920s was an expensive undertaking which only the richest people could afford. At the end of 1908, it is estimated that there were around 40,000 cars in France. A number of the women on the ACFF committee had husbands who were involved in running the ACF. Committee members included women from the Rothschild family, socialites and women connected with the nascent motor production trade. Members could add an ACFF badge to their car, mounted to their radiator cap.

The ACFF was about more than motor racing, and organised social activities for women interested in motoring, although rallying was a large part of their programme. They organised motorised paper chases and treasure hunt rallies, tours and meets at members’ estates. The events were recorded in the Revue de l'Automobile Club féminin magazine, which was published by Count Edme de Rohan-Chabot, founder of the Rallye Paris – Saint-Raphaël Féminin. The Revue offered advice on vehicle maintenance, road safety and tips for road trips. It showcased notable club members and pioneers of women in motoring, and served as a platform for defending the rights of women drivers. It featured new cars, new technological advances, driving laws and regulations and served as a mechanism for women motorists to exchange ideas and experiences. It also carried advertising for motoring products and services.

== ACFF rallies ==
1925: Paris-La Baule

1930: Paris-Cannes event won by Magdeleine, Comtesse de Ganay in a Renault Reinastella car.

1931: Paris-Amsterdam

1932: Paris-Rome

1934: Surprise rally - ending in Rambouillet

1935: Forest trial, won by Jacqueline Seligmann, a Chanel dress was the prize.

1935: Winter Sports Rally from Paris-Chamonix

1936: Paris and Le Touquet, won by Jacqueline Seligmann.

== Presidents ==
- 1926: Anne de Rochechouart de Mortemart until her death.
- 1933: Élaine Greffulhe

== Notable members ==
- Giorigina Bingen, wife of car manufacturer Andre Citroen
- Magdeleine Goüin
- Marguerite Mareuse, one of the first women to race at Le Mans
- Beatrice Reinach.
- Hélène van Zuylen

== Gallery ==
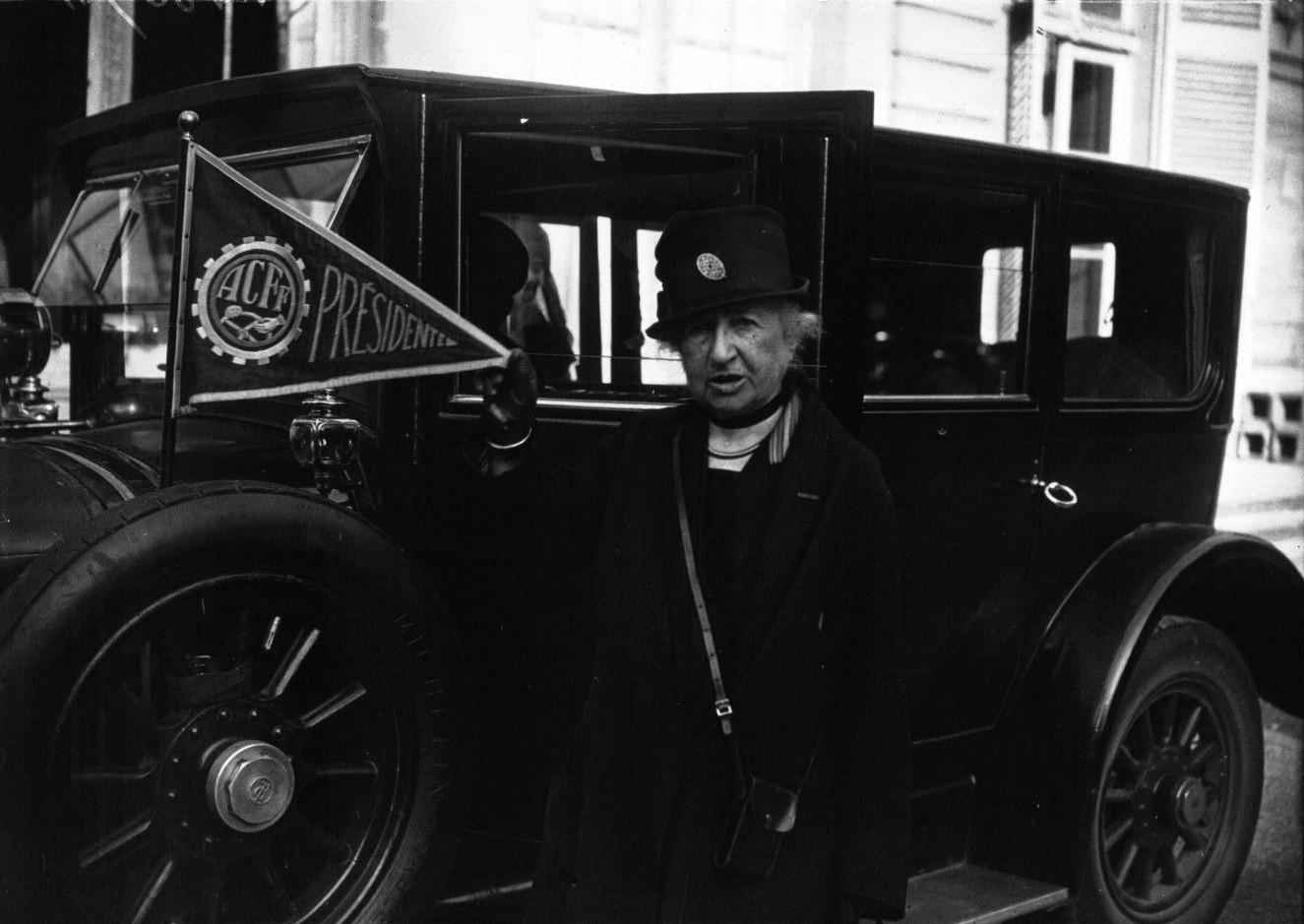
Duchesse d'Uzès - president of l'Automobile Club féminin in 1927, posing next to an ACFF pennant attached to the bonnet of a car

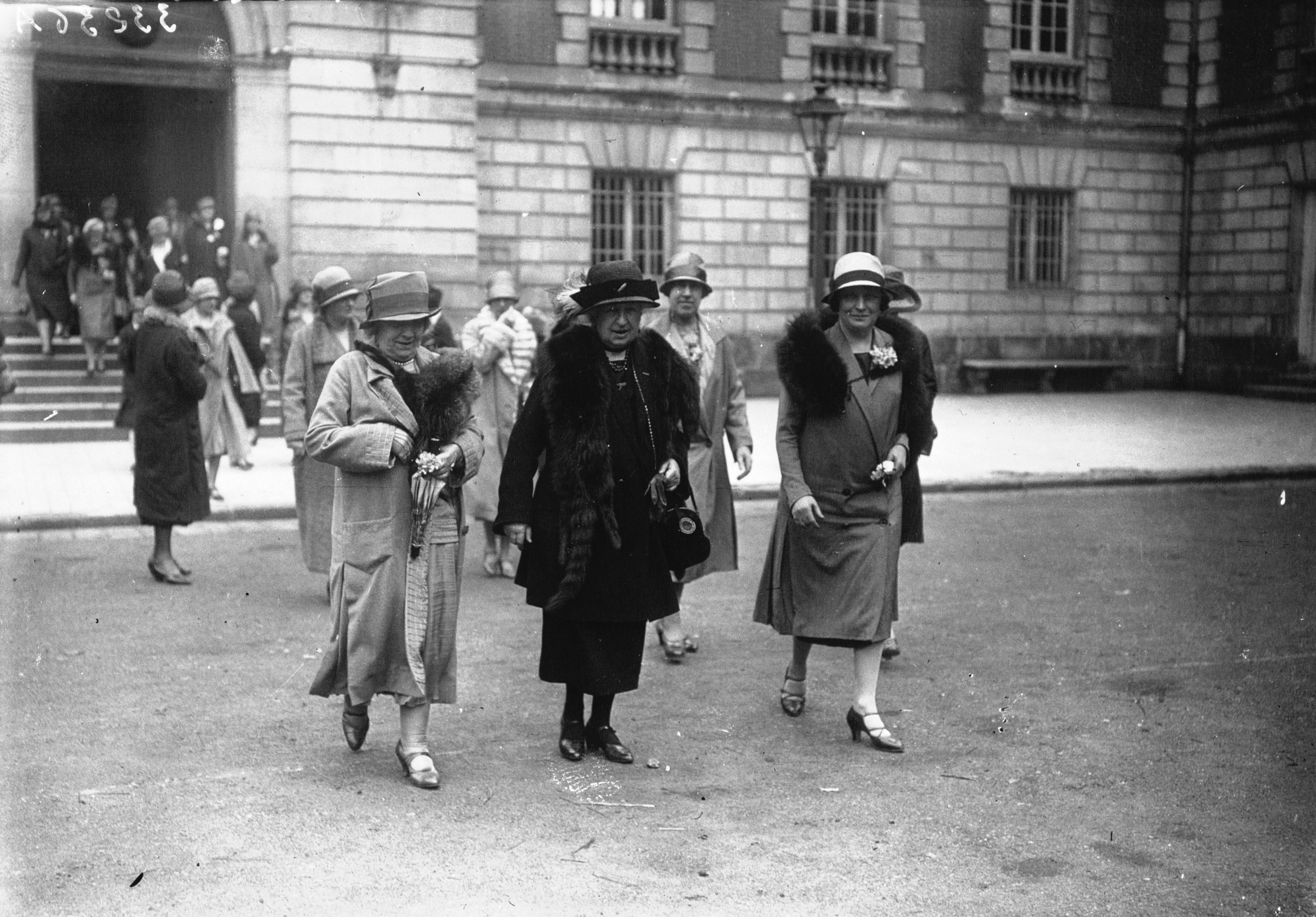
The first outing of the Automobile Club féminin, at Rambouillet

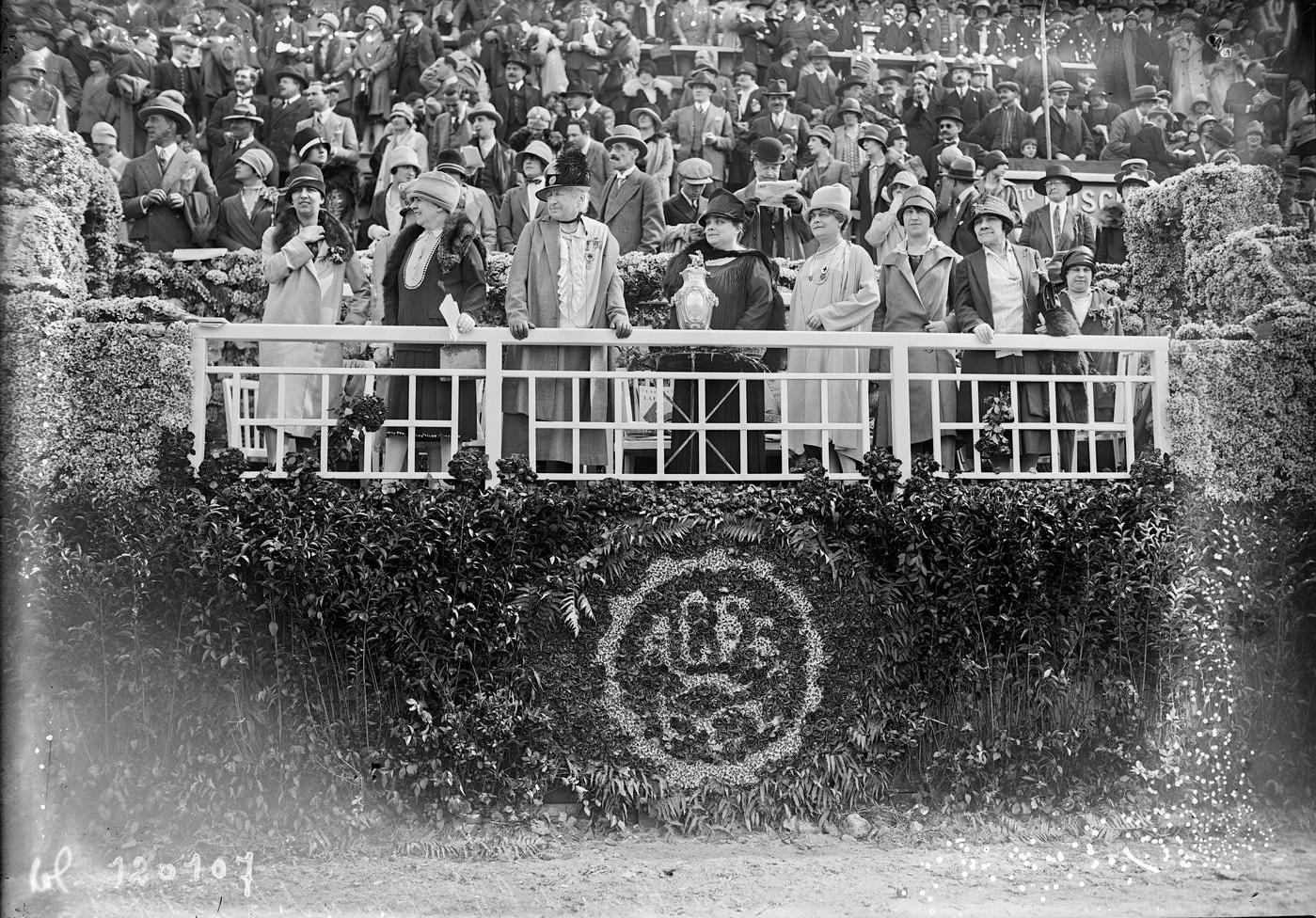
Flower-covered balcony at the ACFF's Monthléry Autodrome Ladies' Day, 12 June 1927

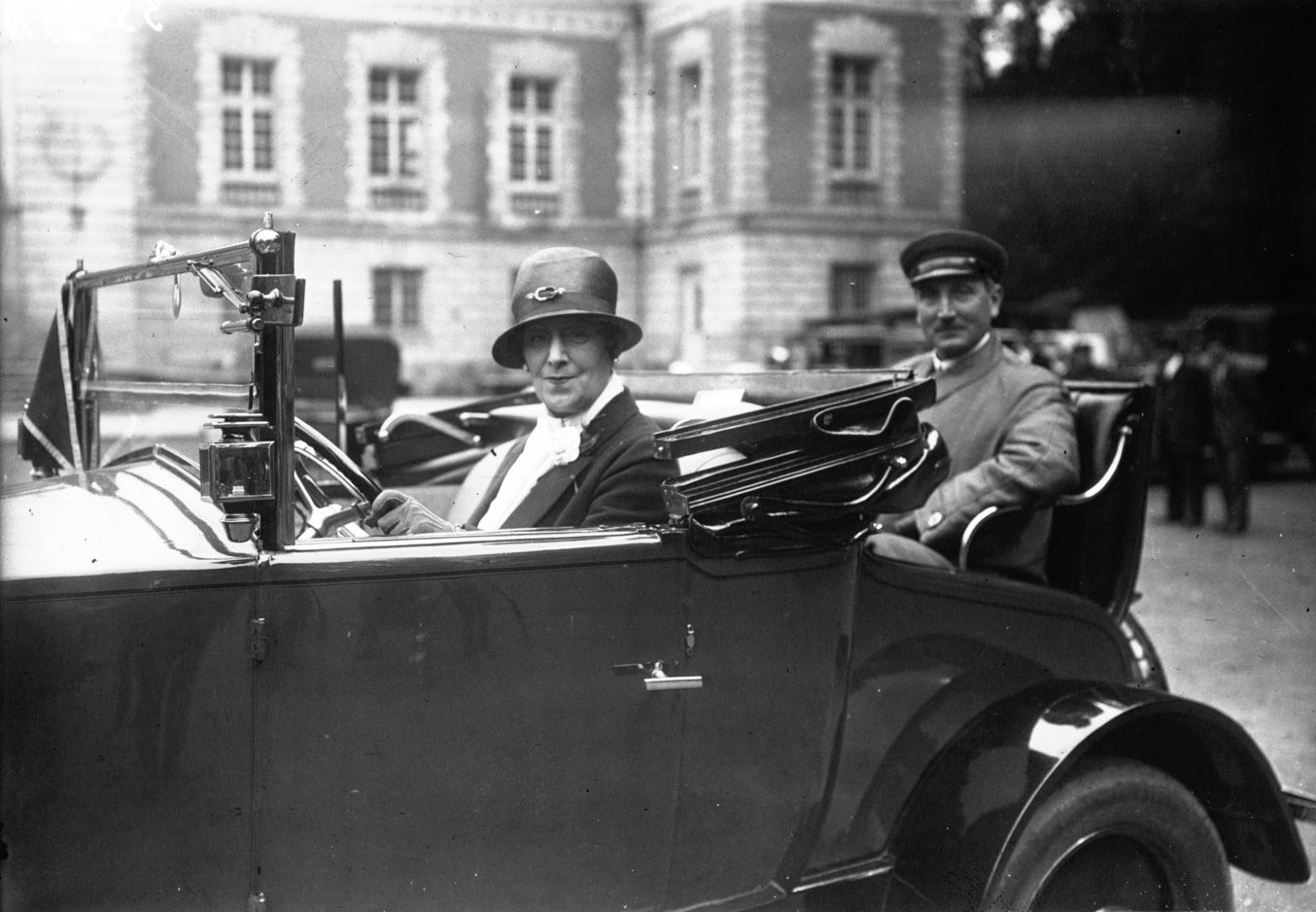
First outing of the Automobile Club féminin - Baronne Hélène de Rothschild in her car

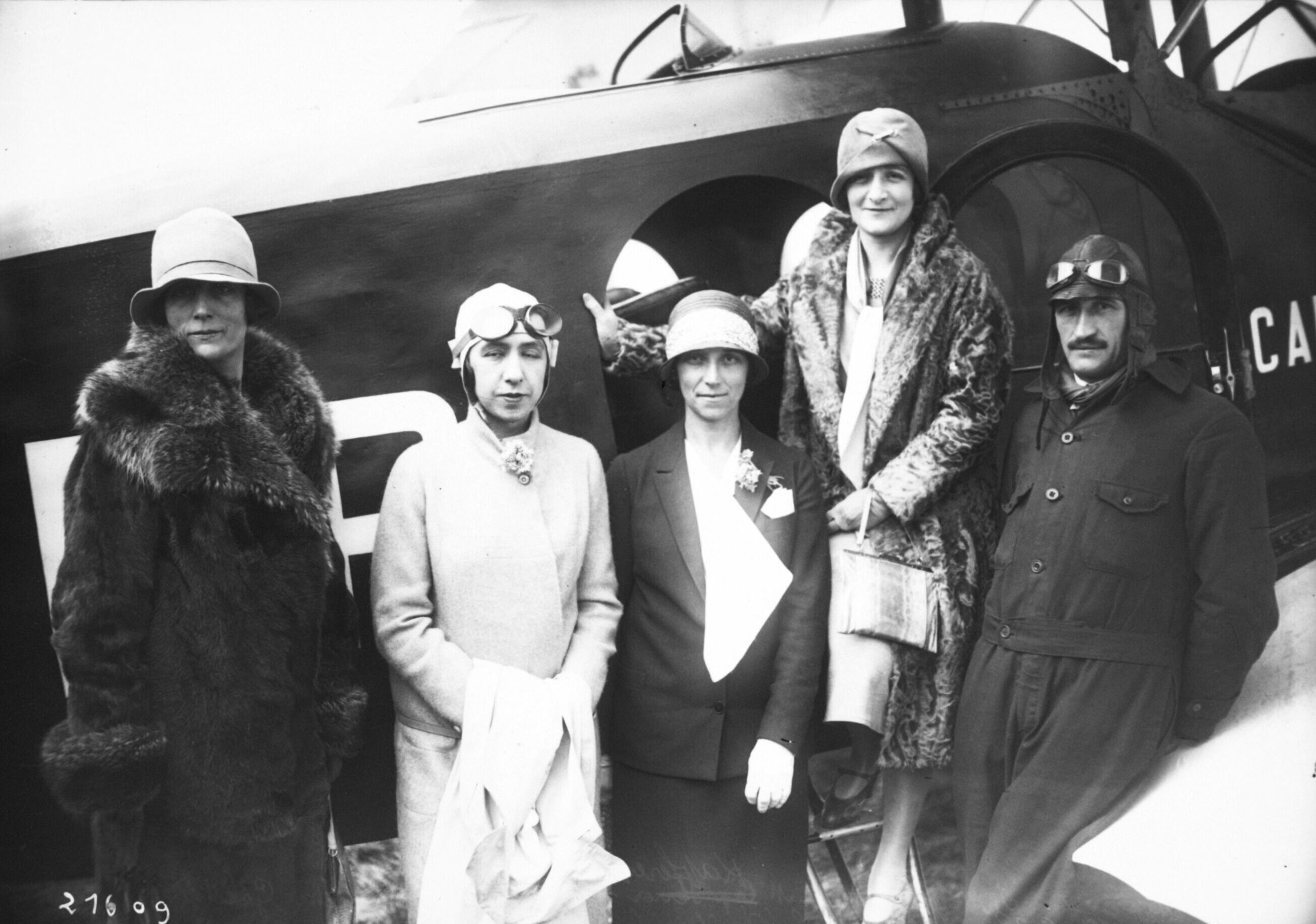
Visit by l'Automobile club féminin to Bourget, 19 May 1928, showing Henry Kapferer, Mme Lasne, Mme Citroën, Mme Aubry, princesse Galitzine

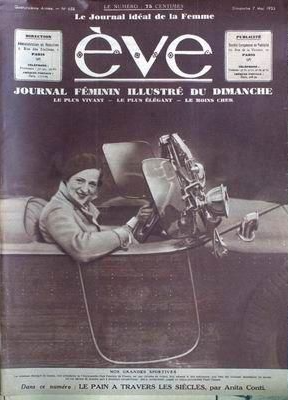
La comtesse de Ganay in her Renault Reinastella car, on the cover of Ève magazine (1933)

== See also ==
Aéroclub féminin la Stella
