= James Rush =

American physician (1786–1869)

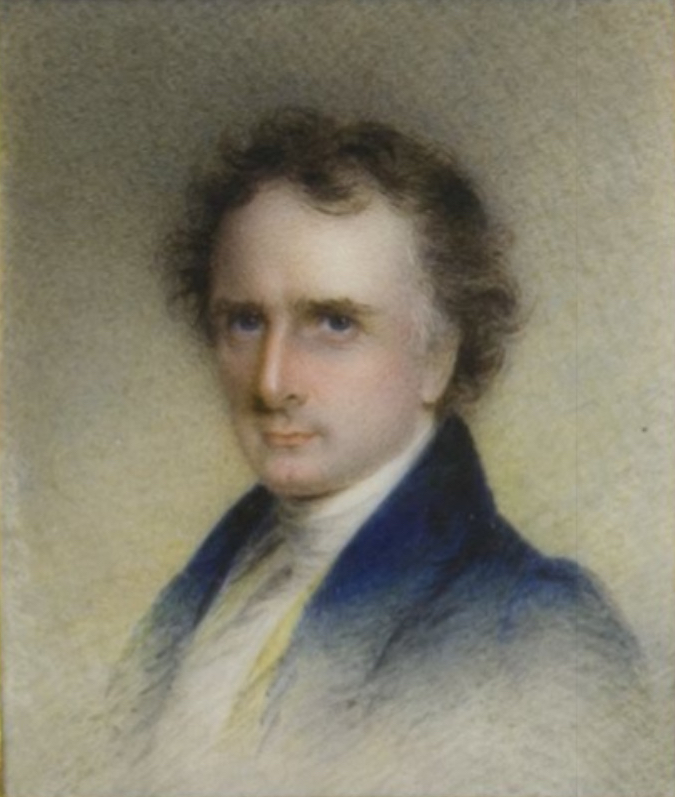
Portrait by Anna Claypoole Peale (1829), from the collection of the Library Company of Philadelphia

James Rush (1786–1869) was an American medical doctor and writer.

== Life ==
Dr. James Rush, son of doctor Benjamin Rush, was born in Philadelphia, Pennsylvania, on March 1, 1786. He graduated from Princeton in 1805, and at the medical department of the University of Pennsylvania in 1809. He subsequently studied in Edinburgh, and, returning to Philadelphia, practised for several years, but afterward relinquished the active duties of his profession to devote himself to scientific and literary pursuits. He married his wife, Phoebe Ann Rush, in 1819. Phoebe Ann was one of the daughters of Jacob Ridgeway, and the two of them lived together in their large Philadelphia mansion which he built. This large mansion played host to numerous large balls and parties, as Phoebe Ann was very outgoing and social. He died in Philadelphia on May 26, 1869. He left $1,000,000 for the Philadelphia Library Company for the erection of the Ridgeway Branch of the Philadelphia Library, banning every-day novels, mind-tainting reviews, controversial politics and newspapers in the hope to keep the library from becoming too urban.

== Time as a Physician ==
At an early age, James Rush was pressured by his father, Benjamin Rush, to become a physician and eventually take over the family practice. After graduating from Princeton in 1805, Rush studied under his father at the University of Pennsylvania, learning and adopting many of his medical practices, the most notable of which was the practice of bloodletting. After studying under his father, James Rush travelled to Edinburgh, Scotland to begin his post-doctoral studies at the University of Edinburgh, where Rush's practices of bloodletting were challenged. After a year of studies in Edinburgh, Rush moved to London to continue his studies. While in London, James Rush spent much of his time experiencing various fine arts such as music and art. He enjoyed aristocratic life in England, but otherwise wished to return to the United States. Upon returning, James Rush took over his father's practice without losing any significant amount of patients. After the death of his father, Rush began to lose interest in his practice as a physician and began exploring other avenues of life. Rush found that democratic life was incapable of studying basic science and decided to spend his time researching science rather than running his family's practice.

== Works ==
His publications include:

1. Philosophy of the Human Voice (Philadelphia, 1827);
2. Hamlet, a Dramatic Prelude in Five Acts (1834);
3. Analysis of the Human Intellect (2 vols., 1865);
4. Rhymes of Contrast on Wisdom and Folly (1869).

== Philosophy of the Human Voice ==
Credited as Rush's most important work, Philosophy of the Human Voice was published in 1827 and considered one of the most important work behind the science of speech at its time. In his book, he discusses his thoughts on human speech, discussing his idea on how speech of one could be controlled and improved instead of pre-determined. The main concept Rush wanted to establish was how the "voice must have distinct meanings or signs for declaring our thoughts and actions". Rush determined the most efficient way to observe speech and research one's articulation was solely through observation. He argued that the thought of speech should be expanded into five separate sectors: vocality, time, pitch, force, and abruptness. This system of sectors of speech would later come to be known as the concept of personal magnetism. Rush also introduced the idea and concepts of phonemes, writing how there were thirty-five different speech sounds, and dividing these into three categories: tonic, subtonic, and atonic. Rush also first introduced the concept of four tones representing how one speaks, stating the four tones of speaking are natural, falsetto, whispering, and orotund. These were all groundbreaking concepts at the time, as no one had ever looked into speech through the psychological view Rush did. His writings on the improvement of speech, looking into how tone, pronunciation, emphasis, and using emotion on one's voice predated the common school of suprasegmental phonetic by around fifty years, and Rush is commonly considered the most important figure towards studying the nineteenth century elocution movement.

== Analysis of the Human Intellect ==
Following his wife's passing in 1857, Rush began work on his next most important piece of writing, Analysis of the Human Intellect. Rush was inspired to write this as many others had looked towards connecting the mind and its functions to Rush's work in Philosophy of the Human Voice, but he was unsatisfied with their conclusions and decided to work towards this connection himself. This work looked to focus on the connection of the mind and the voice, stating "when we shall have a clear physical history of the mind as we now have of the voice, the two subjects will form the first and second parts, but not the whole of the physiology of the senses and the brain". Rush coined the term mentivity as a definition towards how one thinks, and looked into how the brain functions as a physical embodiment of the mind and ones senses. Rush's work in the Human Intellect is stated as one of the primary formations of the behavioristic school of psychology, as he targeted the motor system as a key towards one's behavior, including concepts such as personality, free association, and the effects of social aspects on one's psychology, all of which predated his peers in this field of work. Rush establishes that ones mental process is intertwined to ones psychology and their expression, and that speech connects to ones physiological being and wellness, arguing speech itself is one entity in the brain. This work of the connection of speech directly to ones psychology is important as he was the first writer to make this connection and opened the gateway for more branches of investigation on inner psychology and how it affects ones interactions.

== Sources ==
- Kurtz, Stephen G. (1954). "James Rush, Pioneer in American Psychology, 1786–1869". Bulletin of the History of Medicine, 28(1): pp. 50–59.
- Young, Jeremy C. (2017). "James Rush and the Invention of Personal Magnetism.". The Junto.
- Visit PA Great Outdoors, Pennsylvania Great Outdoors Visitors Bureau, "Narrative of Phoebe Ann Ridgway Rush, Daughter of Jacob Ridgway."
- Wilson, J. G.; Fiske, J., eds. (1900). "Rush, James". Appletons' Cyclopædia of American Biography. Vol. 5. Rev. ed. New York: D. Appleton & Co. p. 350.
- Curtis, Elizabeth G. "Library Company of Philadelphia." The Encyclopedia of Greater Philadelphia, Rutgers University, 2016,
- Ostwald, P., & Rieber, R.W. (1980). . "James Rush and the Theory of Voice and Mind." In R.W. Rieber (Ed.), Psychology of Language and Thought (pp. 105–119). Springer, Boston, MA.
