= Nelly Martyl =

French singer, war nurse, philanthropist

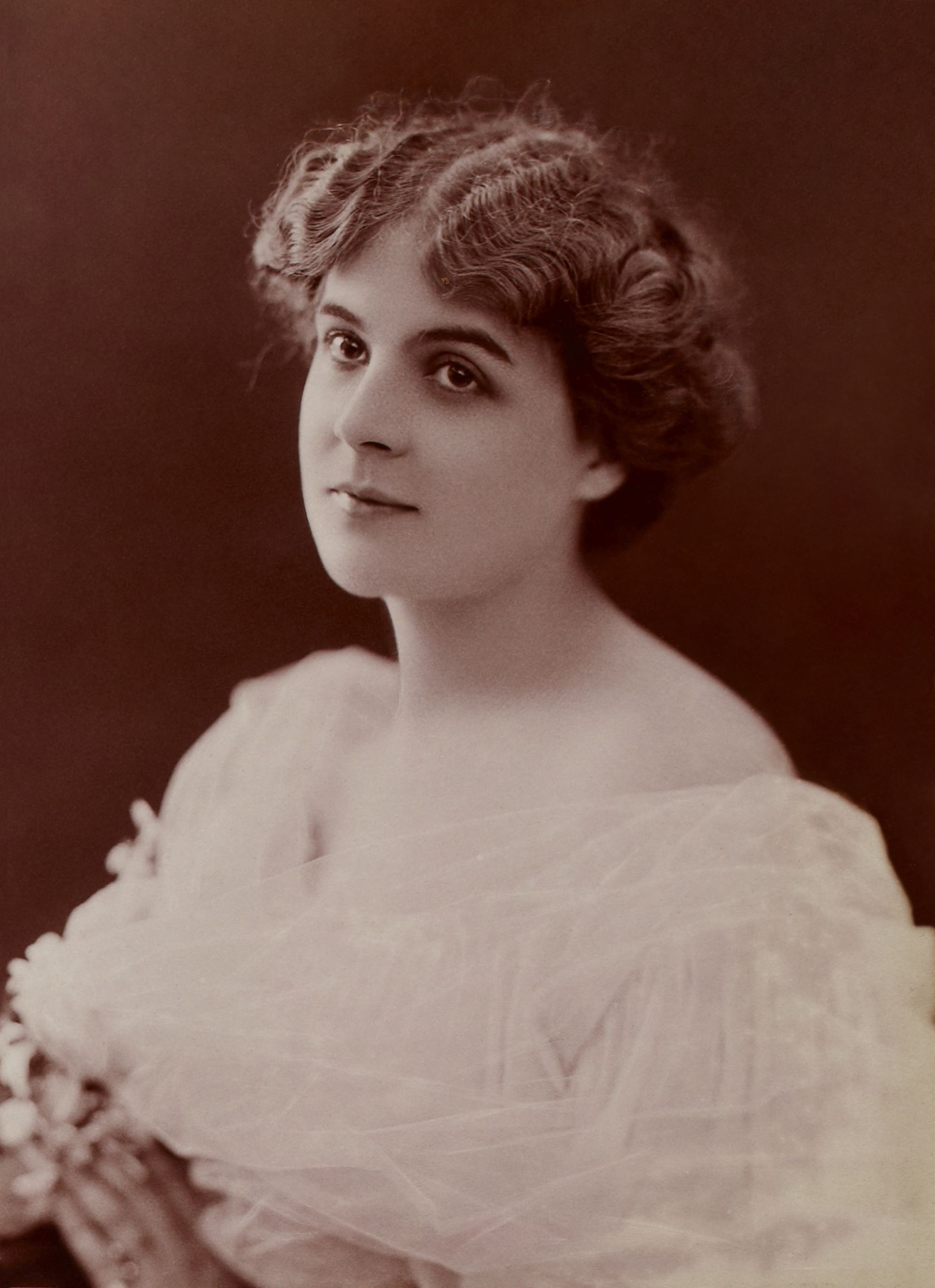
- Nelly Martyl by Jean Reutlinger
- Born: Nelly Adèle Anny Martin; 1 April 1884; Paris, France
- Died: 9 November 1953 (aged 69); Versailles, Yvelines, France
- Other name: Nelly Martyl Scott
- Occupations: Operatic soprano; War nurse; Philanthropist
- Spouse: Georges Scott (m. 1909; died 1943)

Nelly Martyl (1 April 1884 – 9 November 1953), born Nelly Adèle Anny Martin, was a French soprano opera singer based in Paris who participated in several world premieres. During World War I and the 1918 flu epidemic, she worked as a nurse and received the Croix de Guerre for her service.

== Early life ==
Nelly Adèle Anny Martin was born in Paris, the daughter of Jules Edouard Martin and Hélène Fleming. Her mother was English. She trained as a singer at the Conservatoire de Paris, studying with teachers Martini and Jacques Isnardon.

== Career ==
Martyl was a soprano opera singer in Paris. She made her professional debut in 1907 in Gluck's Armide. She joined the Opéra-Comique in 1909, where she appeared as Micaela in Bizet's Carmen, Sophie in Massenet's Werther, Mimi in Puccini's La bohème and in the title role of Massenet's Manon, among others. Martyl performed in several world premieres, including Le Borne's La Catalane (1907), Erlanger's La Sorcière (1912), and, at the Monte Carlo Opera, Massenet's Amadis in 1922. She appeared in London's Royal Opera House Covent Garden in 1910, and recorded a duet in 1911. She was featured in fashion magazines, wearing gowns by Paris designers.

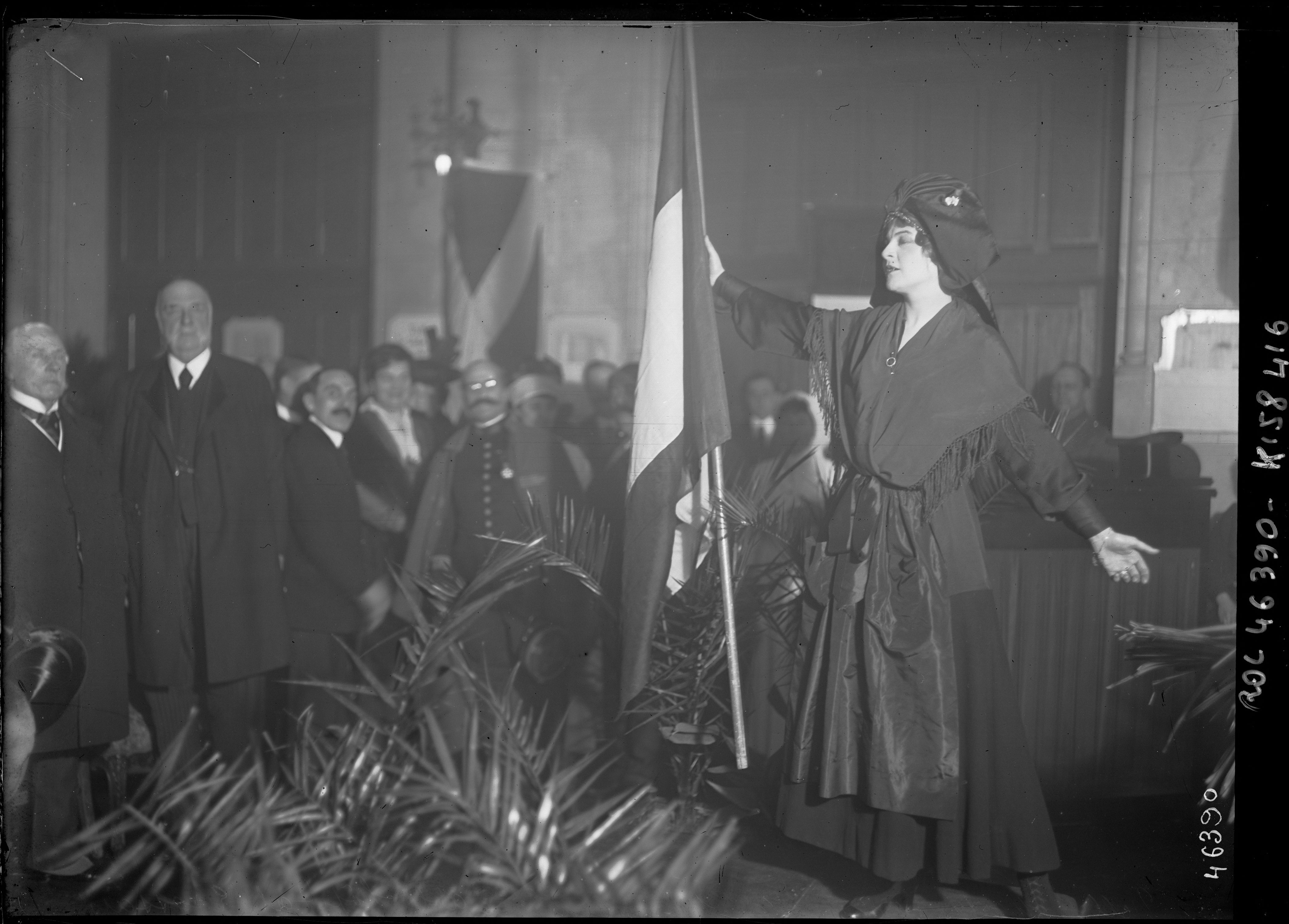
Martyl sings "La Marseillaise" at a Scottish hospital during World War I

During World War I, she became a Red Cross nurse. She served at the Battle of Verdun in 1916, where she was called "la fée de Verdun" (the fairy of Verdun), and at the Second Battle of the Aisne in 1917. She also gave recitals in the military hospitals, and sang at benefit concerts. She was wounded and gassed, and after the war continued as a nurse during the 1918 flu epidemic. She was decorated with the Croix de Guerre with the carte du combattant (signifying service under particular hazard) in 1920.

After the war, Martyl created a charitable medical foundation with automobile racer Magdeleine Goüin, and the Nelly-Martyl Foundation's dispensary opened in 1929 in Paris; the building was razed in 2017, despite some efforts to preserve it.

== Personal life ==
In 1909, Nelly Martyl married French artist Georges Scott. They remained married until his death in 1943. She died in 1954, aged 69 years, in Versailles. In 2016, to mark the centenary of the Battle of Verdun, a novel about Martyl, La fée de Verdun by Philippe Nessmann, was published.
