= Georges Scott =

French war correspondent and illustrator

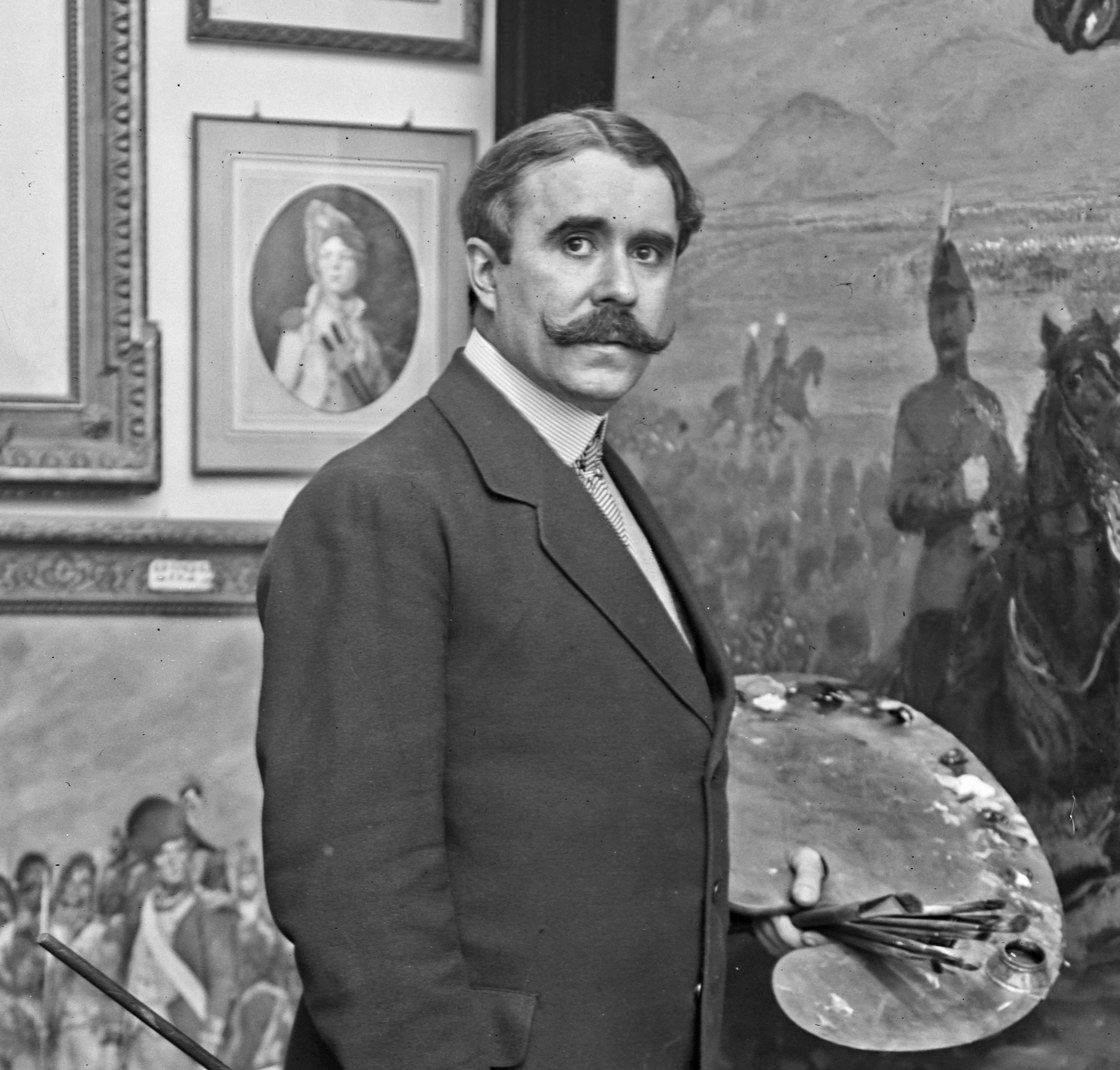
Photo of Scott, 1911

Georges Bertin Scott (10 June 1873 – 10 January 1943) was a French war correspondent and illustrator for the French magazine L'Illustration during the early 20th century. His work was part of the painting event in the art competition at the 1928 Summer Olympics.

== Life ==
He produced paintings of the Balkan Wars and the First World War, and also covered and illustrated scenes from the Spanish Civil War and the early Second World War. One of his works, an oil painting of his depicting King Constantine I of Greece during the Balkan Wars hangs in main entry hall of the Presidential Palace in Athens. In 1909 Scott married French singer Nelly Martyl, who served as a nurse during the First World War, and was awarded the Croix de Guerre.

== Gallery ==
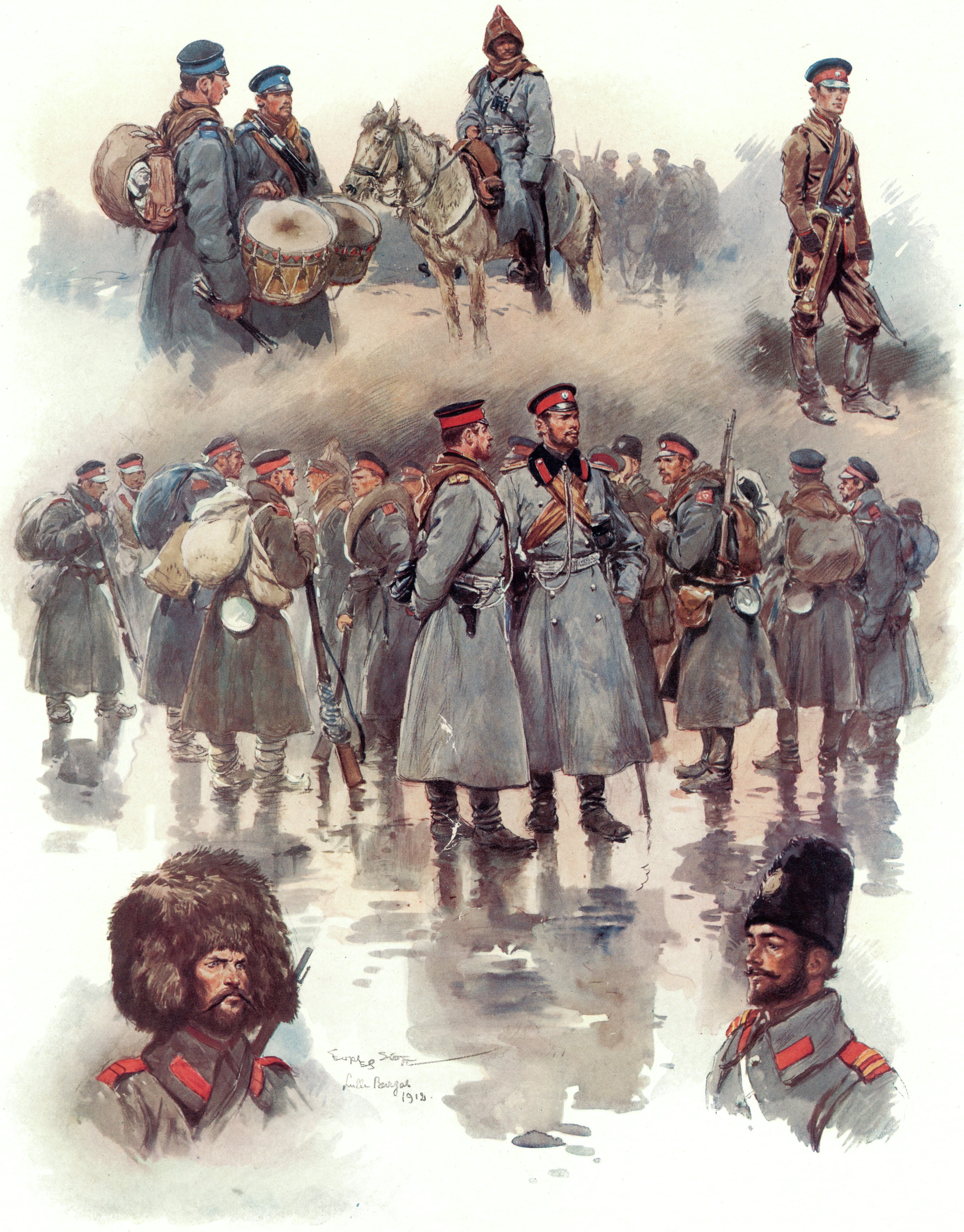
Bulgarian soldiers of the Balkan Wars, painted by Scott for L'Illustration.

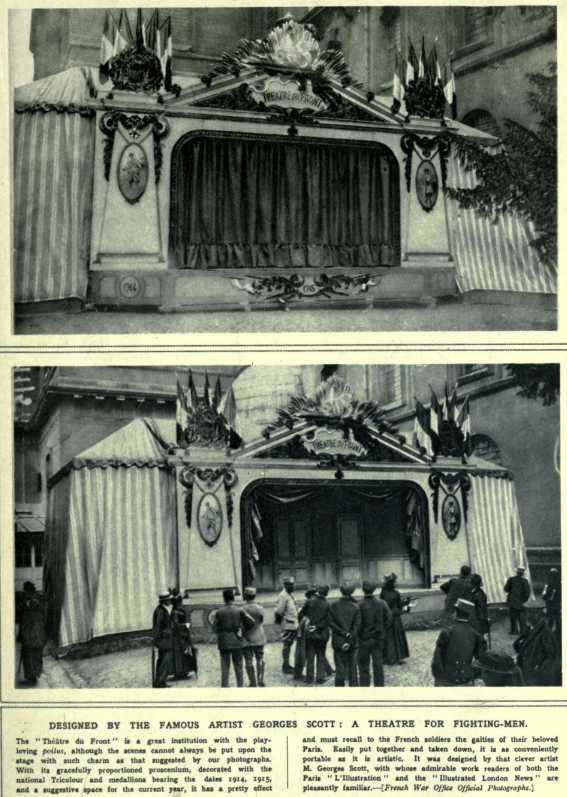
The Théâtre du Front designed by Scott in 1916 (Illustrated War News).

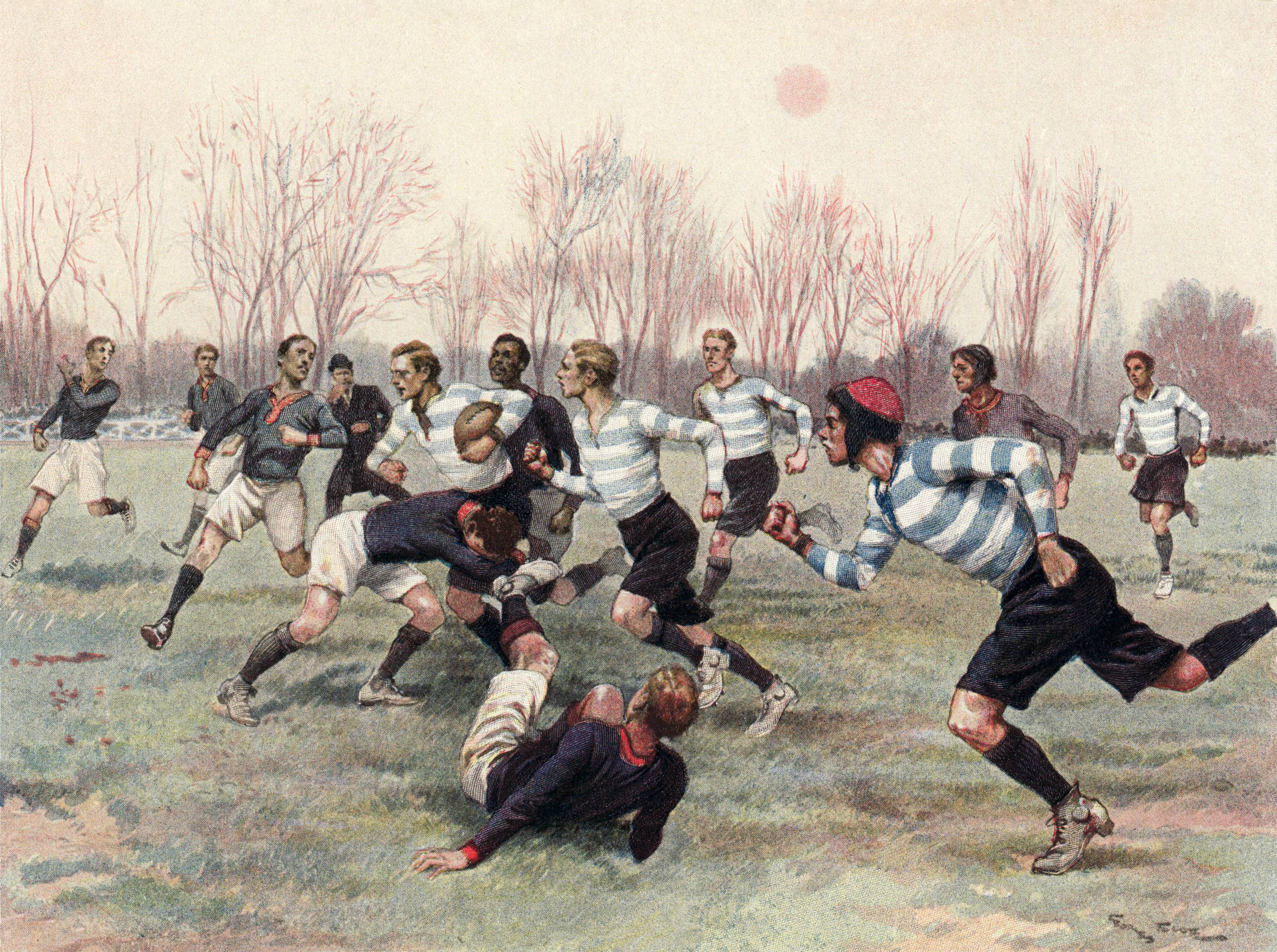
Racing Club v Stade Français Paris, painted in 1906 for a sports calendar.

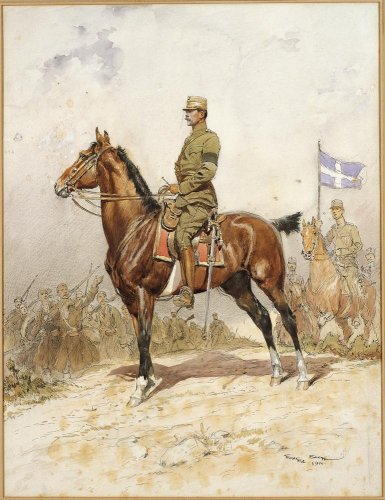
King Constantine I of Greece during the Balkan Wars.

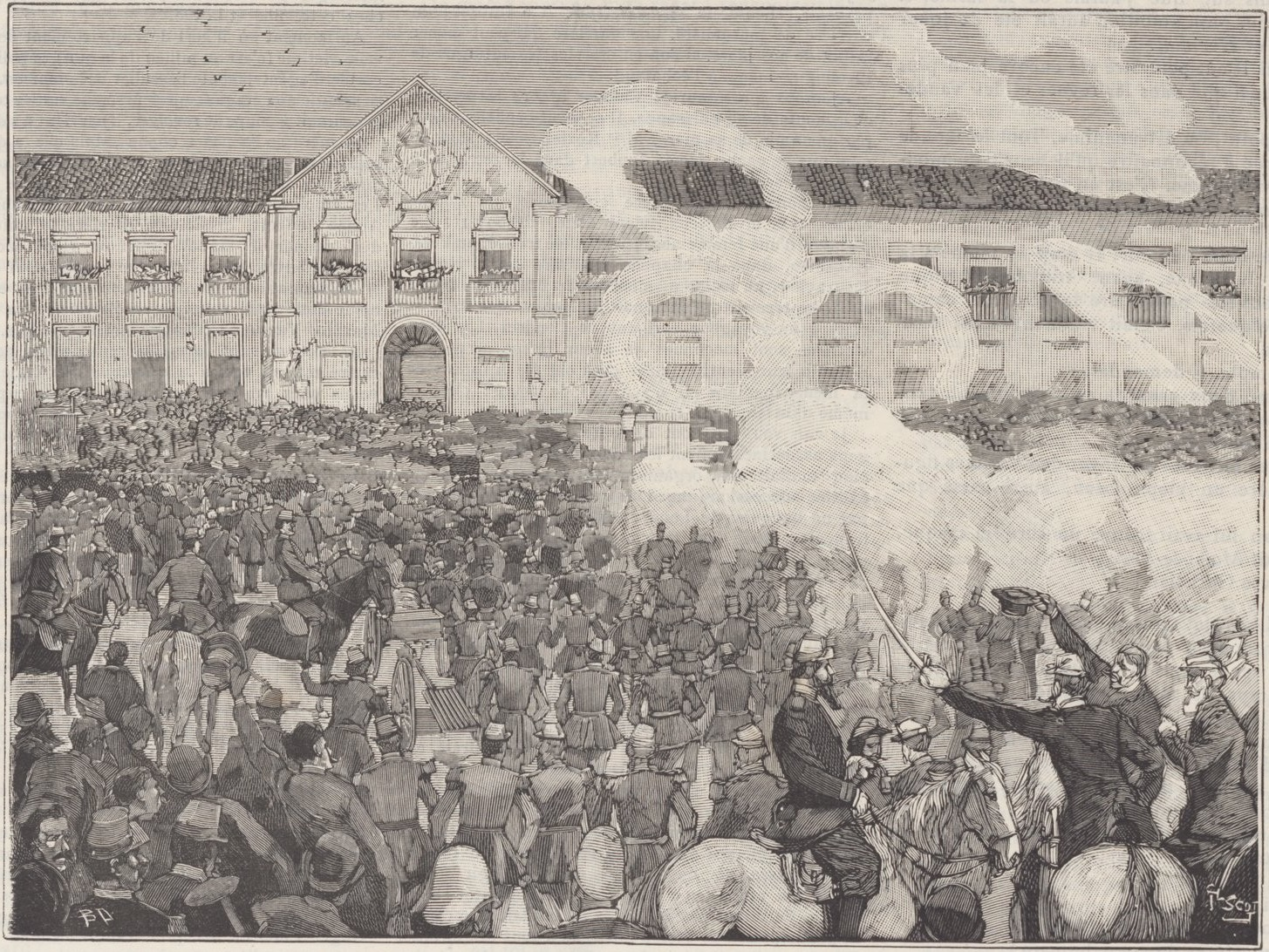
Proclamation of the Republic in Brazil, published in Le Monde Illustré, nº 1.708, 21/12/1889.

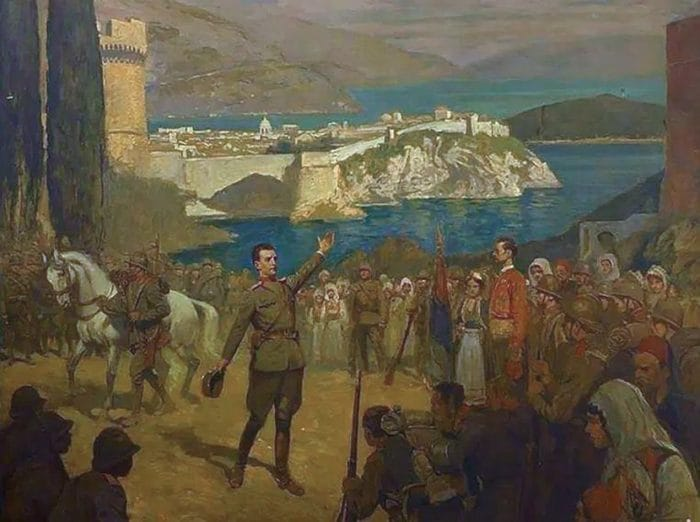
Serbian army liberates Dubrovnik (13. 11. 1918)
