= List of senators of Vosges =

Location of Vosges in France

Following is a list of senators of Vosges, people who have represented the department of Vosges in the Senate of France.

== Third Republic ==
Senators for Vosges under the French Third Republic were:

- Nicolas Claude (1876–1888)
- Claude Claudot (1876–1879)
- Eustache Georges (1876–1891)
- Christian Kiener (1882–1896)
- Charles Ferry (1888–1891)
- Jules Ferry (1891–1893)
- Alfred Brugnot (1891–1903)
- Albert Ferry en 1893)
- Paul Frogier de Ponlevoy (1894–1909)
- Louis Parisot (1896–1909)
- Jules Méline (1903–1925)
- Thierry Comte d'Alsace (1909–1934)
- Henry Boucher (1909–1920)
- Paul Lederlin (1920–1927)
- Maurice Flayelle (1926–1938)
- Adrien Richard (1927–1940)
- André Barbier (1934–1940)
- Louis Gaillemin (1936–1940)

== Fourth Republic ==
Senators for Vosges under the French Fourth Republic were:

- Henri Poincelot (1946–1948)
- Jean-Marie Grenier (1946–1952)
- Michel Madelin (1948–1952)
- Louis Courroy (1952–1959)
- Henri Parisot (1952–1959)

== Fifth Republic ==
Senators for Vosges under the French Fifth Republic:

In office	Name	Party	Notes
1959–1977	Louis Courroy	Independent Republicans (RI)	
1959–1977	Henri Parisot	Independent Republicans (RI)	
1977–1995	Albert Voilquin	Independent Republicans (RI)	
1977–2014	Christian Poncelet	Rally for the Republic (RPR) then The Republicans group (Senate) (UMP)	
1995–2004	Gérard Braun	Rally for the Republic (RPR) then The Republicans group (Senate) (UMP)	
From 2014	Daniel Gremillet	The Republicans group (Senate) (UMP)	
From 2004	Jackie Pierre	The Republicans group (Senate) (UMP)	

== Sources ==
- Liste des anciens sénateurs de la IIIème République par circonscription (in French), Sénat de France
- Liste des anciens sénateurs de la IVème République par circonscription (in French), Sénat de France
- Liste des anciens sénateurs de la Vème République par circonscription (in French), Sénat de France
- Liste par département - Vosges (in French), Sénat de France
