= Magdeleine Goüin =

French racing driver and philanthropist

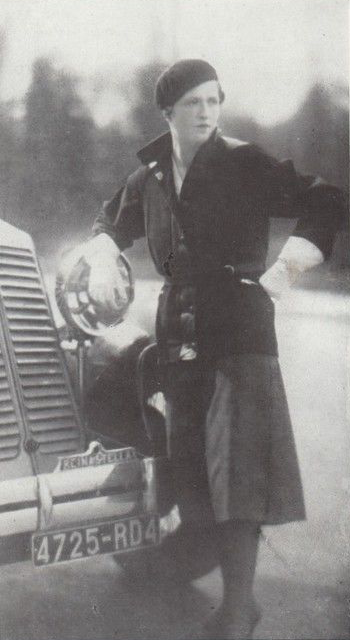
Goüin in 1930

Magdeleine Goüin, countess Bernard de Ganay (2 March 1901 – 30 June 1949) was a French racing driver and philanthropist.

== Early life ==
Goüin was born 2 March 1901 in the 8th arrondissement of Paris. She was a daughter of Édouard Goüin and Suzanne du Built (future countess of Segur-Lamoignon), and the sister of Henry Goüin, president of the Fondation Royaumont.

== Career ==
As a racing driver, Goüin won the Rallye Paris – Saint-Raphaël Féminin in 1930 at the wheel of a Renault Reinastella type RM. She finished second the following year at the Rally Paris-Amsterdam behind Suzanne Deutsch de La Meurthe.

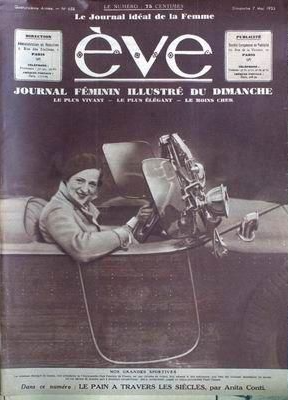
La comtesse Bernard de Ganay at the wheel of her Renault Reinastella car, on the cover of Ève magazine (1933)

She became vice-president of the Automobile Club féminin de France, which was presided over at the time by Anne de Rochechouart de Mortemart.

== Philanthropy ==
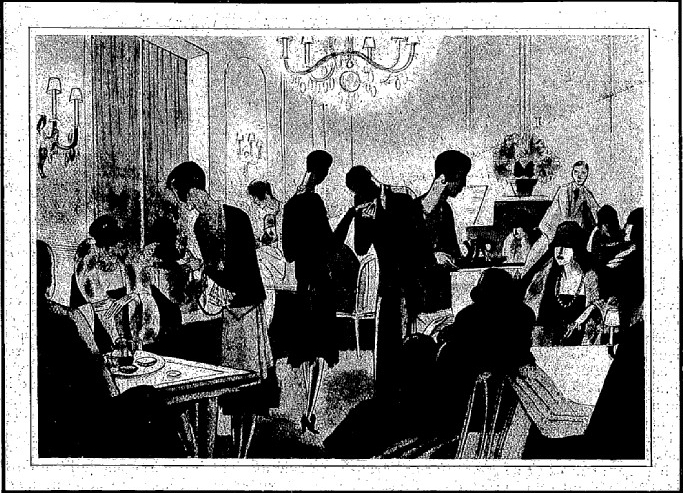
The Rosy, illustrated in Femina Magazine (1926)

Goüin established and hosted "“The Rosy”, a charity tea party which raised funds for the work of Visiting Nurses of France (founded by her mother-in-law the Marquise de Ganay) and the dispensary of the Nelly-Martyl Foundation of the rue de Belleville. The tea parties were often held in luxury hotels, like the Hotel George V in Paris.

== Personal life ==
In 1919, she married Count Bernard de Ganay, president of Polos de France, son of the Marquis Jean de Ganay and Berthe de Béhague and grandson of Etienne, Marquis de Ganay.

She died on 30 June 1949 in Casablanca, Morocco, age 48.

Her granddaughter Christine de Ganay was first married to Pal Sarkozy, and then to Frank G. Wisner. Goüin's great-grandchildren include Olivier Sarkozy.
