= Jacob Ridgway =

American merchant and diplomat (1768-1843)

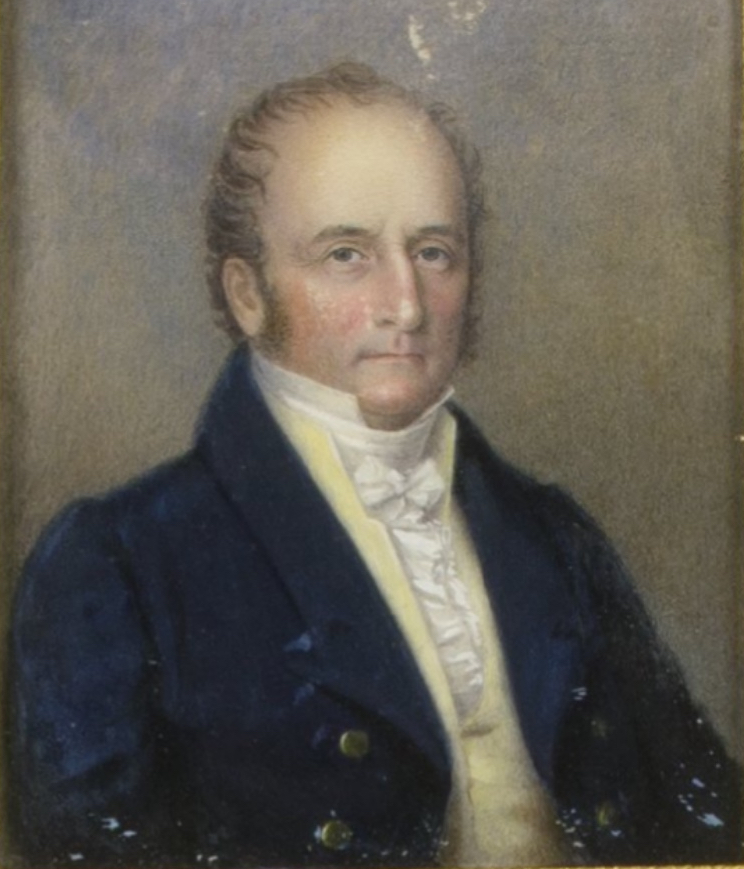
- Born: April 18, 1768; Little Egg Harbor, Province of New Jersey
- Died: April 30, 1843 (aged 75); Philadelphia, Pennsylvania, U.S.
- Resting place: Laurel Hill Cemetery, Philadelphia, Pennsylvania. U.S.
- Spouse: Rebecca Rawle (m. 1794; died 1817)
- Children: 4
- Relatives: Emily, Marquise de Ganay (granddaughter)

Jacob Ridgway (April 18, 1768 – April 30, 1843) was an American merchant and diplomat from Philadelphia. He served as Consul for the United States to Belgium during Thomas Jefferson's presidency.

== Early life ==
Ridgway was born on April 18, 1768, in Little Egg Harbor, New Jersey. He was the youngest of five children born to John Ridgway and Phebe (née Bellanger) Ridgway, who were members of the Society of Friends. His father died when he was around six or seven years old and his mother died when he was around sixteen, after which he went to Philadelphia with his older sister and her husband, who he chose as his guardian.

== Career ==
Ridgway studied the wholesale dry goods business under Samuel Shaw and succeeded as a partner in the business with his son, Thomas Shaw. He later went into partnership with his brother-in-law, James Smith, until the business was sold to Joseph Pryor. Ridgway and Smith then went into the shipping business and were very successful before the Napoleonic Wars between England and France when their ships were seized. Finding it necessary to live abroad to protect their property, Ridgway moved to London where he ran the business before settling in Antwerp where he succeeded Isaac Coxe Barnet, to serve as Consul for the United States appointed by President Thomas Jefferson. (Note: Belgium did not have formal diplomatic relations until 1832, when Hugh S. Legaré, the former Attorney General of South Carolina, became Chargés d'Affaires to Belgium.) While there, he also became a partner in Merton & Ridgway, (Note: This has alternatively been referred to as Mestoris & Ridgway.) while still continuing the firm of Smith & Ridgway.

While he was the United States' commercial agent at Antwerp, he corresponded with Secretary of State James Madison and Robert R. Livingston was America's Minister to France. Ridgway requested Livingston's assistance with procuring an acknowledgment of his commission from the French government.

=== Real estate ===
While abroad, he sent his income back to Philadelphia to invest in real estate property. In the early 1800s, as part of a larger land purchase, he acquired 40,000 acres (160 km^{2}) that became Elk County. His nephew, James Gillis, convinced him the area could become a lucrative lumber camp due to the proximity of Elk Creek and the Clarion River, a tributary of the Allegheny River. The area, which was named Ridgway, Pennsylvania, in his honor, became an industrial center where they manufactured leather, iron, clay, and lumber products, silk goods, railroad snow plows, dynamos, and machine tools.

== Personal life ==
In the winter of 1794, Ridgway was married to Rebecca Rawle (1773–1817), a daughter of Benjamin Rawle and Hannah (née Hudson) Rawle. Together, they were the parents of:

- Susan Ridgway (1797–1885), who married Thomas Rotch (1792–1840) in 1816. After his death, she married, as his second wife, Dr. John Rhea Barton in 1843.
- Phoebe Anne Ridgway (1799–1857), who married Dr. James Rush in 1820.
- Caroline Ridgway (1804–1820), who died unmarried.
- John Jacob Ridgway (1807–1885), who married Elisabeth Willing (1819–1904) in 1836.
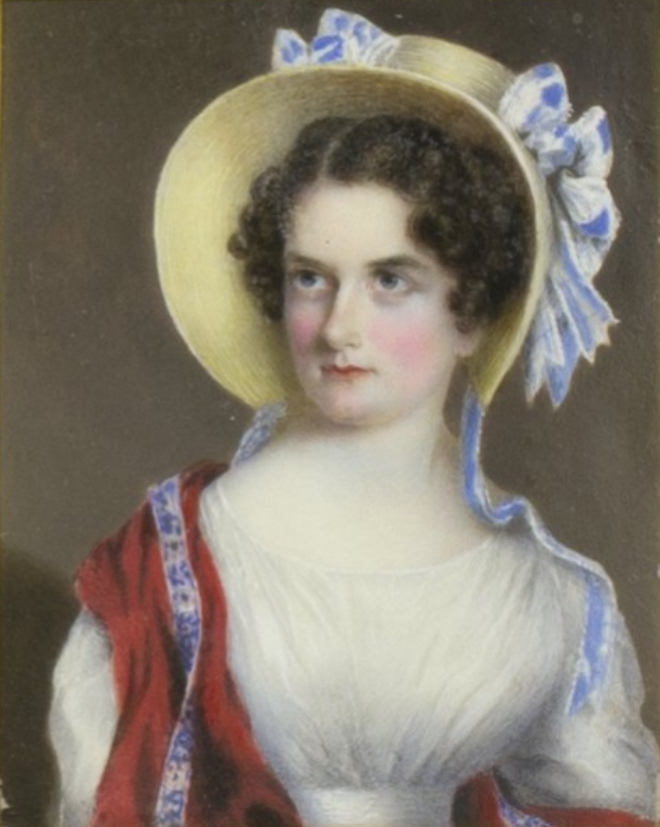
Phoebe Anne Ridgway Rush.

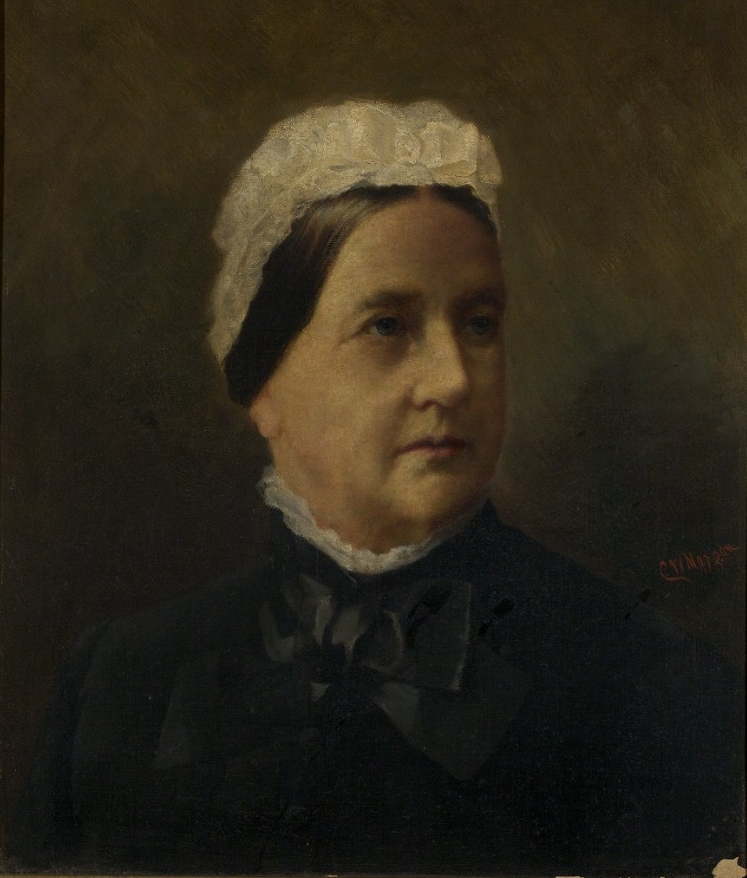
Susan Ridgway Rotch Barton.

After a three-week illness, Ridgway died on April 30, 1843, on Chesnut Street, opposite Independence Hall, in Philadelphia. He was interred at Laurel Hill Cemetery. At the time of his death, he was the wealthiest man in Philadelphia, and was likely the second wealthiest person in the United States behind John Jacob Astor. His son managed his real estate empire.

=== Descendants ===
Through his eldest daughter Susan, he was a grandfather of Alice Caroline Barton (1833–1903), who married Edward Shippen Willing. They were the parents of Susan Ridgway Willing (wife of Francis Cooper Lawrance Jr.), John Rhea Barton Willing (who did not marry), and Ava Lowle Willing (wife of John Jacob Astor IV until their divorce in 1910, and, thereafter, to Thomas Lister, 4th Baron Ribblesdale).

Through his only son John Jacob, he was a grandfather of Charles Henry Ridgway (1852–1913), a member of the English Club of Pau, France (and husband of Ellen Richards Munroe), and Emily Ridgway (1838–1921), who married Etienne, Marquis de Ganay, a French aristocrat and art collector. Emily was a friend of the American writer Edith Wharton, and bought the Château de Courances in 1895.
