= Gaston, Marquis de Galliffet =

French general (1830–1909)

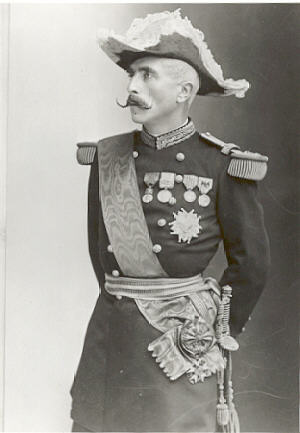
Photo of the marquis de Galliffet by Nadar.

Gaston Alexandre Auguste, Marquis de Galliffet, Prince de Martigues (23 January 1830 – 8 July 1909) was a French general, best known for having taken part in the repression of the 1871 Paris Commune. He was Minister of War in Waldeck-Rousseau's cabinet at the turn of the century, which caused a controversy in the socialist movement, since independent socialist Alexandre Millerand also took part in the same government, and was thus side by side with the Fusilleur de la Commune (the "Commune's executioner").

== Military interventions and Minister of War ==
Born in Paris, Gaston Galliffet entered the army in 1848 and was commissioned as a sub-lieutenant in 1853. He served with distinction at the Siege of Sevastopol in 1855, in the Italian War of 1859, and in Algeria in 1860, after which for a time he served on the personal staff of the emperor, Napoleon III.

During the French intervention in Mexico, Galliffet displayed great gallantry in 1863 as a captain at the siege and storming of Puebla, when he was severely wounded. When he returned to France to recover from his wounds, he was entrusted with the task of presenting the captured standards and colours to the emperor, and was promoted chef d'escadron. He returned to Algeria in 1864, took part in expeditions against the Arabs, returned to Mexico as a lieutenant-colonel and, after winning further distinction, became in 1867 colonel of the 3rd Chasseurs d'Afrique.

In the Franco-Prussian War of 1870–71, he commanded this regiment in the Army of the Rhine, until promoted to Général de brigade on 30 August. At the Battle of Sedan, which marked the defeat of Napoleon III and the subsequent collapse of the Second French Empire, he led the brigade of Chasseurs d'Afrique in the heroic charge of General Margueritte's cavalry division, which earned him the admiration of the old king of Prussia. Made prisoner of war at the capitulation, he returned to France during the siege of Paris by the French Army of Versailles, and commanded a brigade during the repression of the 1871 Paris Commune. He was henceforth one of the most criticised figures in French public life, along with Adolphe Thiers who had directed the assault. Gallifet established a processing center at the Porte de la Muette, on the edge of the Bois de Boulogne, where he would hold reviews of the Communard prisoners due to be marched to Versailles. From these groups he would select prisoners for immediate execution based on his own criteria. To Gallifet, a man wearing a watch was assumed to have been a Commune 'official', a man with grey hair was assumed to have participated in the uprisings of 1848. Others were selected merely for their "outstanding ugliness or coarseness of feature". To the desperate entreaties of one woman, who threw herself on her knees begging for mercy, he replied

'Madame, I have frequented every theatre in Paris; your acting will have no effect on me.'

In the suppression of the Paris Commune, he did his duty, as he saw it, rigorously and inflexibly, and earned a reputation for severity, which, throughout his later career, made him the object of unceasing attacks in the press and the chamber of deputies. In 1872, he took command of the Batna subdivision of Algeria, and commanded an expedition against El Goléa, surmounting great difficulties in a rapid march across the desert, and inflicting severe defeats on the revolting tribes.

On the general reorganisation of the army, he commanded the 31st infantry brigade. Promoted General de Division in 1875, he successively commanded the 15th Infantry Division at Dijon, the IX Army Corps at Tours, and in 1882 the XII Army Corps at Limoges. In 1885, he became a member of the Conseil Supérieur de la Guerre. He conducted the cavalry manoeuvres in successive years, and attained a Europe-wide reputation on all cavalry questions and, indeed, as an army commander.

Decorated Grand Officer of the Legion of Honour in 1880 by Léon Gambetta, he was appointed governor of Paris. In 1887, he was also decorated with the Grand Cross of the Legion of Honour. He then received the Médaille militaire for his able conduct of the autumn manoeuvres in 1891. After again commanding at the manoeuvres of 1894, he retired from the active list.

Later, he took an important part in French politics, as war minister (June 1899 to May 1900) in Waldeck-Rousseau's cabinet, and distinguished himself by the firmness with which he dealt with cases of unrest in the army in the midst of the Dreyfus affair. Galliffet then retired into private life, and died on 8 July 1909 in Paris, aged 79.

== In popular culture ==
In Russian the word galifé (галифе), a type of flared-hip breeches once used in the military and similar to the original design of jodhpurs, is named after Galliffet.

== See also ==
- France in the long nineteenth century
- Second French Empire
- Second French intervention in Mexico
- French Algeria
- 1870 Franco-Prussian War
- 1871 Paris Commune
- Pierre Waldeck-Rousseau's cabinet

== Bibliography ==
- André Gillois, Galliffet le fusilleur de la Commune, Paris, France-Empire, 1985 (in French)
