= List of people from Columbia, South Carolina =

The following people were born in, residents of, or closely associated with Columbia, South Carolina.

== Government and law ==
- Weston Adams, United States ambassador
- DeAndrea G. Benjamin, lawyer serving as a United States circuit judge of the United States Court of Appeals for the Fourth Circuit
- Stephen K. Benjamin, politician, mayor of Columbia, Director of the Office of Public Engagement for the Biden administration, and one of the senior advisors to president Biden
- Adair Ford Boroughs, United States attorney for the District of South Carolina
- John T. Campbell, politician, mayor of Columbia
- J. Michelle Childs, U.S. circuit judge of the U.S. Court of Appeals for the District of Columbia Circuit
- Jim Clyburn, US Congressman, former US House Assistant Democratic Leader and US House Majority Whip
- Bob Coble, politician, mayor of Columbia
- John E. Courson, politician, President Pro Tempore of the South Carolina Senate
- Kirkman Finlay, Jr., politician, mayor of Columbia
- Dick Harpootlian, politician and attorney
- Henry Washington Hilliard, former U.S. Congressman for the 2nd District of Alabama, Confederate Army officer, and U.S. Minister to Brazil
- Robert H. Hodges, Jr., federal judge
- George Dean Johnson Jr., politician and lawyer
- Robert E. Kneece, politician and lawyer
- Henry McMaster, incumbent governor of South Carolina, since 2017
- Matthew J. Perry, lawyer, judge
- Carol Rasco, director of the Domestic Policy Council under President Bill Clinton; advocate for disability rights, education, and children
- Jennifer Clyburn Reed, federal co-chair of the Southeast Crescent Regional Commission
- Daniel Rickenmann, mayor of Columbia
- Bakari T. Sellers, attorney, political commentator, former politician
- Woodrow Wilson, 28th president of the United States
- Bill Workman, economic consultant, Greenville mayor; former Columbia resident

== Film and acting ==
- Julian Adams, film producer, writer, and actor
- Aziz Ansari, actor and comedian, Parks and Recreation
- Paul Benjamin, actor
- Anna Camp, actress, Pitch Perfect films
- Kelsey Chow, actress
- Mike Colter, actor
- Angell Conwell, actress
- Kristin Davis, actress, Sex and the City
- Stanley Donen, film director and choreographer
- Michael Flessas, actor
- Ed Grady, actor
- Scott Holroyd, actor
- Fiona Hutchison, actress
- Barton MacLane, actor, playwriter, screenwriter
- Elizabeth MacRae, actress
- Allison Munn, actress
- Kara Robinson Chamberlain, victim's advocate, influencer, and host
- Gloria Saunders, actress
- Ann Savage, actress
- Sadie Stanley, actress
- Josh Stolberg, screenwriter
- Robin Swicord, screenwriter
- Jonny Weston, actor
- Lee Thompson Young, actor

== Education ==
- Clarissa Minnie Thompson Allen, writer and educator
- Walter Edgar, professor, historian, author
- Richard Theodore Greener, pioneering African-American professor, librarian, attorney, diplomat
- Mary Haskell, educator
- Elias Marks, founder of Barhamville Institute
- Steve Pettit, fifth president of Bob Jones University
- Sophie Sosnowski, founder of young women's schools

== Activism ==
- Sarah Mae Flemming, civil rights activist
- Kevin Alexander Gray, activist
- Taylor Richardson, advocate, activist, speaker, student and philanthropist
- Modjeska Monteith Simkins, civil rights activist, Secretary of the South Carolina NAACP
- Tom Turnipseed, activist, formerly of State Senate

== Music ==
- Nickolas Ashford of Ashford & Simpson r&b duo, born in Fairfield County
- Atlas Road Crew, alternative rock, Southern rock band
- Bored Suburban Youth, hardcore punk band
- Pi'erre Bourne, producer and rapper
- Speaker Knockerz, producer and rapper
- Ben Bridwell, lead singer of Band of Horses, alternative rock band
- Phillip Bush, pianist
- Crossfade, alternative metal/hard rock band
- Danny!, musician
- From Safety To Where, rock band
- Hootie & the Blowfish, band
- Danielle Howle, musician and songwriter
- Iron & Wine (Samuel Beam), indie rock musician
- JetsonMade, producer
- Alexis Jordan, singer
- Lil Ru, singer
- Linda Martell first black female country singer, from Batesburg-Leesville
- The Movement, reggae band
- Chris Potter, musician
- The Sequence, first female hip-hop group in 1979
- Zachary Stevens, heavy metal singer
- Angie Stone, singer
- Stretch Arm Strong, hardcore punk band
- Toro y Moi, musician and songwriter
- Ron Westray, trombonist

== Art ==
- Eugene Dovilliers, artist
- Larry Francis Lebby, artist
- Alicia Leeke, artist
- Guy Lipscomb, artist
- Brooklyn Mack, ballet dancer
- Rodney McMillian, painter, professor
- Sara Mearns, ballet dancer
- Jacolby Satterwhite, contemporary Afrian-American artist
- Ashley Tuttle, ballet dancer

== Science and medicine ==
- Charles F. Bolden, Jr., astronaut
- Tyrone Hayes, biologist
- Alonzo Clifton McClennan, doctor
- Kary Mullis, scientist (Nobel Prize winner/graduate of Dreher High School)
- John H. Yardley, pathologist

== Military ==
- Charles W. Bagnal, military officer and lawyer
- Arthur C. Davis, Navy admiral
- Maxcy Gregg, Civil War veteran
- Alexander Cheves Haskell, Civil War veteran
- Lloyd E. Jones, Army major general

== Literature and publishing ==
- Annie Maria Barnes, journalist, editor, and author
- James Dickey, poet, author of Deliverance in 1970, #42 on Modern Library's list of the 100 best 20th-century novels
- Percival Everett, author, Pulitzer Prize winner, professor, painter
- Nikky Finney, poet, professor
- William Price Fox, novelist
- Terrance Hayes, poet
- Ed Madden, poet, professor, and editor
- Ryan Magee, editor
- John Henry McCray, African American newspaper journalist and publisher, politician, and civil rights activist
- Ray McManus, poet
- Tom Poland, author
- Julian Selby, printer, journalist and writer

== Sports ==
- Ike Anderson, Olympic Greco-Roman wrestler
- Jordan Anderson (racing driver), NASCAR team owner and driver
- Grayson Barber, soccer player
- Zinn Beck, MLB player, manager
- Ryan Bethea, professional football wide receiver
- Michael Boulware, NFL safety
- Peter Boulware, NFL linebacker, 4-time Pro Bowl, Super Bowl champion
- Bob Bowman, swim coach, best known as coach of Michael Phelps
- Zack Bowman, NFL cornerback
- Bruce Chen, Major League Baseball pitcher
- Tyrone Corbin, NBA player and coach
- Dennis Daley, NFL offensive tackle
- Brad Edwards, NFL defensive back
- Alex English, NBA forward, member of Basketball Hall of Fame
- The Fabulous Moolah, WWE/WWF wrestler
- Samkon Gado, NFL running back
- Grayson Greiner, MLB catcher
- Kirby Higbe, MLB pitcher
- LaMarr Hoyt, MLB pitcher, AL Cy Young Award winner
- Hal Jeffcoat, MLB player
- Dustin Johnson, professional golfer
- Erik Kimrey, college football coach
- Savannah McCaskill, soccer player, member of USWNT
- Xavier McDaniel, NBA player
- BJ McKie, professional basketball player
- Jermaine O'Neal, NBA player, 6-time All-Star
- The Patriot, real name Del Wilkes, pro wrestler
- Zach Prince, USL Championship soccer player
- Brian Quick, NFL player
- Andre Roberts, NFL wide receiver, All-Pro kick returner
- Darell Scott, NFL defensive tackle
- Richard Seymour, NFL defensive tackle, 7-time Pro Bowl, 3-time Super Bowl champion
- Dawn Staley, basketball coach and former player
- Duce Staley, NFL player and coach
- Freddie Summers, NFL defensive back
- Channing Tindall, NFL linebacker
- Trick Williams, professional wrestler, WWE NXT (NXT Champion)
- A'ja Wilson, WNBA power forward for the Las Vegas Aces
- Wesley Bryan, professional golfer
- Dan Brode, NASCAR

== Other ==
- Kimberly Clarice Aiken, Miss USA 1994
- Quincy Allen, Serial killer
- Joseph Bernardin, Catholic cardinal
- Marie Boozer, adventuress from Civil War era
- Mark Cerney, founder of the Next of Kin Registry (NOKR)
- Ainsley Earhardt, news anchor
- Richard Evonitz, serial killer
- Aaron Fechter, mechanical engineer and entrepreneur, creator of The Rock-afire Explosion, and one of two founders of ShowBiz Pizza Place
- Gerald Mason, cop killer
- Craig Melvin, news anchor
- Dylann Roof, terrorist and white supremacist mass murderer behind the Charleston church shooting
