= Lipscomb =

Lipscomb may refer to:

== People ==
- Lipscomb (surname)

== Places ==
United States

- Lipscomb, Alabama
- Lipscomb, Texas
- Lipscomb County, Texas

== Others ==
- Lipscomb Academy, high school in Nashville, Tennessee, United States
- Lipscomb House, plantation house in Durham, North Carolina, United States
- Lipscomb University, university in Nashville, Tennessee, United States
- USS Glenard P. Lipscomb (SSN-685), United States Navy submarine

== See also ==
- Lipscombe
