= Lipscomb (surname) =

Lipscomb is a surname. Notable people with the surname include:

- A. W. G. Lipscomb, Superintendent of the Aborigines Welfare Board in New South Wales, Australia from 1940
- Albert Lipscomb (born 1951), American politician from Alabama
- Andrew A. Lipscomb (1816–1890), American clergyman and educator
- Bob Lipscomb (1837–1895), English cricketer
- David Lipscomb (1831–1917), preacher and founder of Lipscomb University
- Eugene Lipscomb (1931–1963), American football player
- Frank Lipscomb (1863–1951), English cricketer
- George Lipscomb (1773–1846), English physician and county historian of Buckinghamshire
- Glenard P. Lipscomb (1915–1970), US politician and submarine namesake
- Guy Lipscomb (1917–2009), industrialist and watercolorist from Columbia, South Carolina
- Kalija Lipscomb (born 1997), American football player
- Lila Lipscomb, who appears in the movie Fahrenheit 9/11
- Mance Lipscomb (1895–1976), American blues musician
- Mark Lipscomb Jr. (born 1935), American politician from Wisconsin
- Michael Lipscomb (born 1983), American musician
- Nathaniel Lipscomb (1931–1961), American serial killer
- Oscar Hugh Lipscomb (1931–2020), American Roman Catholic Archbishop
- Oswald Lipscomb (1872–1930), American carpenter
- Suzannah Lipscomb (born 1978), English historian
- Trey Lipscomb (born 2000), American baseball player
- William Lipscomb (1919–2011), American inorganic chemist

== See also ==
- Lipscombe
