= BSY (disambiguation) =

BSY most commonly refers to B. S. Yediyurappa, the former Chief Minister of Karnataka.

BSY may also refer to:

- Big Sky Airlines; ICAO airline code BSY
- Bored Suburban Youth, American hardcore punk band, 1985-88
- Brondesbury railway station, London; Network Rail station code BSY
- Bardera Airport, in Gedo, Somalia; ICAO airport code BSY
- Black Suit Youth, American alternative punk band 2004-present
