= Taylor Richardson =

Taylor Richardson may refer to:

- Taylor Richardson (actress) (born 2001), American actress
- Taylor Richardson (activist) (born 2003), American activist
