= Shoo Fly (sternwheeler) =

Sternwheel-driven steamboat

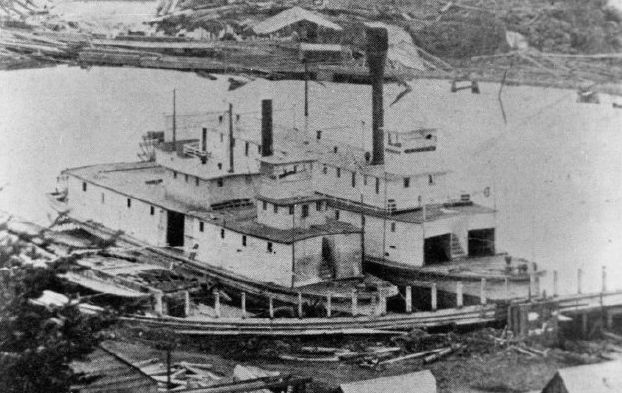
- Shoo Fly (left) and Albany at the boat basin at Oregon City, at Willamette Falls, circa 1873.

History
- Name: Shoo Fly
- Owner: People's Transportation Co.; Oregon Steamship Co (Ben Holladay).; Oregon Steam Navigation Co.
- Route: Willamette River, Columbia River
- In service: 1871
- Out of service: 1878
- Identification: U.S. 23975
- Fate: Dismantled

General characteristics
- Type: inland steamship
- Tonnage: 316.79
- Length: 126 ft (38.4 m), and after reconstruction, 191 ft (58.2 m)
- Beam: 23 ft (7.0 m)
- Depth: 4.5 ft (1 m) depth of hold
- Decks: three (freight, passenger, boat)
- Installed power: twin steam engines, single cylinder, horizontally mounted
- Propulsion: sternwheel

Shoo Fly was a sternwheel-driven steamboat that operated on the Willamette and Columbia rivers in the 1870s. Originally built as primarily a freight boat, the vessel was used in other roles, including towing and clearing of snags. Shoo Fly inspired the name of another sternwheeler on the Willamette River, Don't Bother Me.

== Construction ==
Shoo Fly was built at Canemah, Oregon for the People's Transportation Company and launched, according to one source, early in 1870. According to another source, the steamer was approaching completion on June 25, 1870.

== Dimensions and engineering ==
Shoo Fly was 126 feet long, exclusive of the extension of the main deck over the stern, called the fantail, on which the stern-wheel was mounted. The steamer had a beam (width) of 23 feet, and a depth of hold of 4.5 feet. Shoo Fly was driven by twin single-cylinder steam engines, each one with a 14-inch bore and a 48-inch stroke. The engines generated 13 nominal horsepower. The official merchant vessel registry number was 23975. The tonnage of the steamer was 316.79.

== Operations ==
=== People's Navigation Company ===
Following launch, Shoo Fly was operated by Capt. George Jerome from Oregon City to points on the upper Willamette. Shoo Fly was later commanded by John Kelly (b.1839), J.N. Fisher, and others. On Tuesday, July 19, 1870, Shoo Fly attracted a large crowd at Albany when it reached the wharf there, apparently for the first time. On Thursday, July 21, 1870, Shoo Fly ran from Canemah to Salem in 8 hours and forty minutes.

In August 1870, Shoo Fly was being used to pull snags out of the channel of the upper Willamette River.

In November 1870, Shoo Fly’s arrival at Albany, Oregon was reported rather sarcastically by the local State Rights Democrat newspaper, which had been highly critical of the People’s Transportation Company:

A BOAT! A BOAT! — Last Wednesday the P.T. Co’s palatial steamer “Shoo-Fly” put in an appearance at the Albany wharf — being the first vessel larger than a raft which has navigated the Willamette above Salem for three months. We expect to have regular steamboat connection with Portland hereafter — Providence permitting.

On February 10, 1871, Shoo Fly landed a cargo of 1,388 sacks of wheat, or about 2,776 bushels at the Salem Flour Mill, brought down from towns upriver, which had a large amount of wheat waiting to be shipped to Salem.

=== Sale to Ben Holladay ===
In early September 1871, the People’s Transportation Company went out of business and sold all of its assets, including Shoo Fly, to a corporation controlled by Ben Holladay.

=== Reconstruction and return to service ===
In October 1873, Shoo Fly was rebuilt at a sawmill.

On the morning of December 11, 1872, Shoo Fly, then running under the control of the Oregon Steamship Company, loaded a cargo of wheat and departed downriver with the objective of reaching the ship Cutwater, then moored at Astoria. Downriver from St. Helens, the Columbia was clogged with masses of floating ice. That evening, a telegram was received in Portland, stating that Shoo Fly had safely reached Kalama, Washington, which was 14 miles downriver from St. Helens.

Shoo Fly became one of several steamers, including Ben Holladay, Annie Stewart and Favorite, which towed ocean-going vessels, typically loading wheat, inland from Astoria to Portland, where the cargo would be loaded and then the ship towed back to Astoria. Some of the towing was done for Wiedler’s mills, with Capt. I. Smith (b.1847) in charge of the Shoo Fly.

In March 1875, command of the Shoo Fly shifted from Capt. “Billy” Becannon, who had commanded the steamer for sometime, to Capt. J.N. Fisher.

=== Reported sale for Stikine River service ===
In the early 1870s, the Cassiar gold rush occurred in northern British Columbia. The Stikine River, (then spelled “Stickeen”) which reached the sea near Wrangell, Alaska was the principal means of access to the gold fields in northern British Columbia.

On January 17, 1874, it was reported that “two well known gentlemen of Portland” had purchased Shoo Fly to take it to the Stikine River, and further, these men were arranging to build another light-draft steamer for the same purpose. Despite this report, there appears to have been no attempt ever to transfer Shoo Fly to the Stikine.

== Collisions ==
=== With river steamer Marie Wilkins ===
In November 1874, there was a collision between the Shoo Fly and another steamer, the Marie Wilkins near the mouth of the Willamette River.

Shoo Fly was proceeding downriver, with a ship loaded with grain in tow. Wilkins was coming up river, heavily laden with cargo. causing the vessel to have difficulty in steering. Seeing the difficulty Wilkins was in, the captain of Shoo Fly gave the signal to stop, but Wilkins did not respond in time, and collided with the ship under tow by Shoo Fly. Wilkins sustained only minor damage to its guards, and the vessel was repaired and returned to service a few days later.

=== With steamship Ajax ===
On December 9, 1876, Shoo Fly collided with the much larger (1355 tons) ocean-going steamship Ajax, on the Columbia River, near the mouth of the Willamette River. Shoo Fly had to be beached, where the vessel sank. By December 22, Shoo Fly was reported as being in the process of being raised.

== Disposition ==
Shoo Fly was dismantled in 1878.
