= Scott Holroyd =

American actor (born 1975)

- Born: Scott Powell Holroyd; June 5, 1975 (age 51); Columbia, South Carolina, U.S.
- Occupation: Actor
- Years active: 1993-present
- Spouse: Allison Munn (m. 2007)
- Children: 2

Scott Powell Holroyd (born June 5, 1975) is an American actor.

== Early life and career ==
Holroyd was born and raised in Columbia, South Carolina. He graduated from the University of South Carolina in 1998, receiving a B.A. in Mass Communications and Journalism. In 1993, Holroyd received a small role in the film The Program (for which he was uncredited) and made a guest appearance on the television show Matlock, playing a teenager.

After working in Columbia as an actor on projects in Wilmington, such as Matlock, he moved to New York, studying at the School for Film and Television in Manhattan from 1999 to 2001.

Within three weeks of finishing his program at the School for Film and Television, he signed a three-year contract with As The World Turns, a daytime soap opera on CBS. He was cast as Paul Ryan from 2001 to 2003, starting on July 10, 2001. He was the fifth actor to play the role of Ryan. On May 13, 2003, he made his last appearance on the show, before leaving to pursue other roles. He was replaced by soap opera actor Roger Howarth.

He relocated to Los Angeles in 2004 and has made guest appearances on numerous television shows, including Law & Order: Special Victims Unit, That '70s Show, In Justice, Without a Trace, and Ghost Whisperer. He was also featured in the second season of Dirty Sexy Money as Patrick Darling's brother-in-law Chase Alexander. In 2009 he played Quinn's husband David Fletcher on the seventh season of One Tree Hill, and in 2010, villain spy Justin Sullivan on the third season of Chuck. He returned as David in One Tree Hill for the show's last season, signing in September 2011.

In 2021, he appeared in one episode of MacGyver.

== Personal life ==
Holroyd began dating his childhood friend, actress Allison Munn, in 2004. They became engaged in December 2006 in Paris and married on November 17, 2007 at the French Huguenot Church in Charleston, South Carolina. They reside in Los Angeles with their pet terrier, Buster Keaton. Munn and Holroyd had a son in November 2011, and a daughter in 2015.

== See also ==
- List of Spring Valley High School alumni
- List of Chuck cast members
- List of people from Columbia, South Carolina
