= Lipscombe =

Lipscombe is a surname. Notable people with the surname include:

- Diane Lipscombe (born 1960), British neuroscientist
- Edward Hart Lipscombe (born 1858), American educator and religious leader
- Jesse Lipscombe (born 1980), Canadian actor
- Lorraine Lipscombe, Canadian endocrinologist
- Lydia Lipscombe (born 1979), New Zealand female swimmer
- Nick Lipscombe (born 1958), British military historian

== See also ==
- Lipscomb (surname)
