= George Washington Weidler =

Transportation agent, merchant

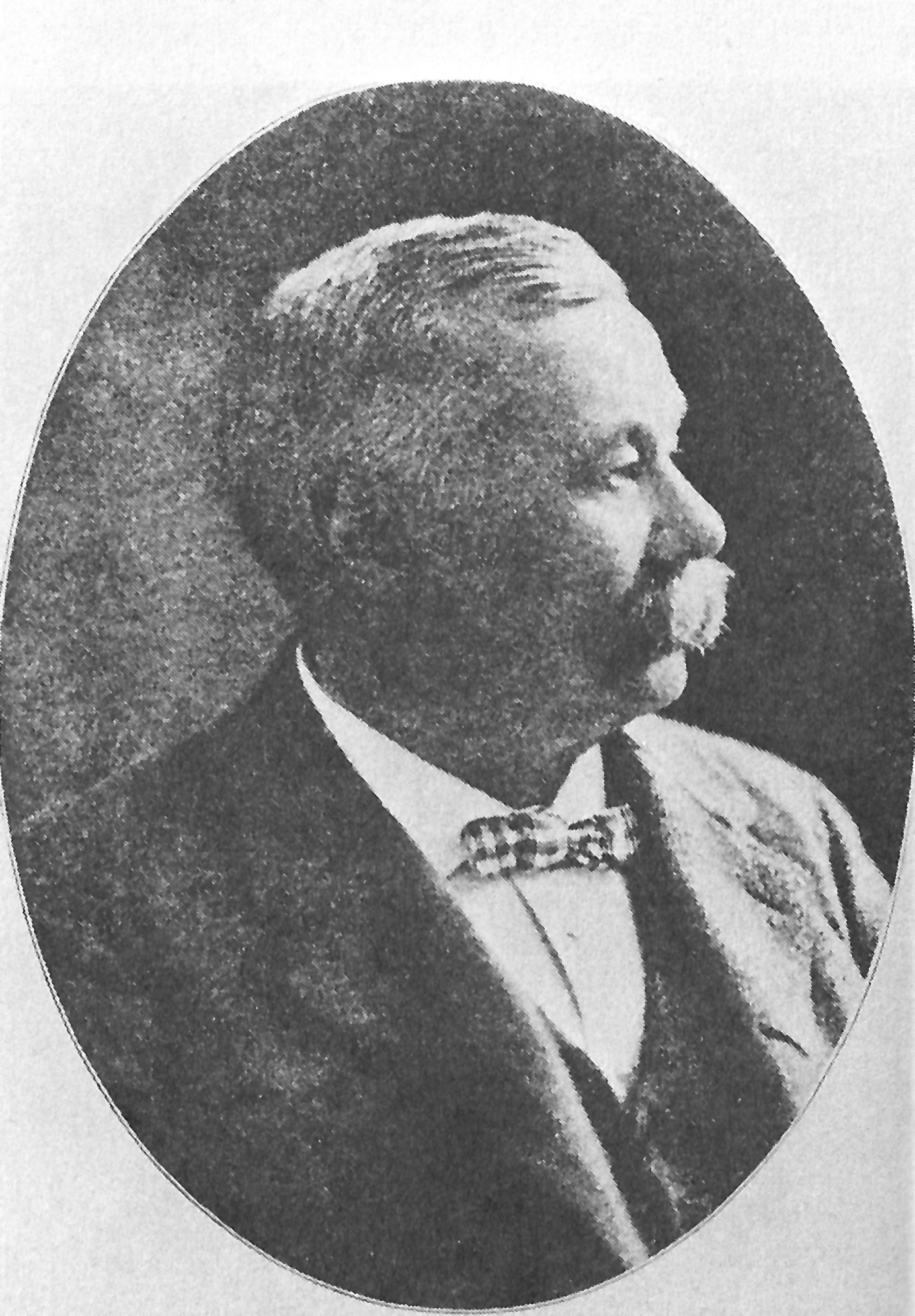
- G. W. Weidler
- Born: October 22, 1837; Lancaster, Pennsylvania, US
- Died: September 19, 1908; Portland, Oregon, US
- Occupation(s): transportation agent, business owner
- Spouse: Hattie Louise Bacon
- Children: 7

George Washington Weidler (October 22, 1837 – September 19, 1908) was a 19th-century transportation agent, investor, and business owner in Portland in the U.S. state of Oregon. Born in Pennsylvania, he moved as a young man to St. Louis, Missouri, where he began a career in merchandising and shipping. His work gradually took him further west, to Utah Territory, Nevada Territory, California, and in 1866 to Oregon, where he remained for the rest of his life.

In Portland, Weidler worked as an agent for Ben Holladay and Henry Villard, both of whom controlled large transportation companies. He was one of the owners of the city's first street railway, and in 1880 he owned a lumber mill that was Portland's largest. He was the first person to sell electric lighting in Portland, and he helped organize a power company that was a predecessor of Portland General Electric.

Weidler was active in the Arlington, Portland, and Commercial clubs in the city. He and his wife, Hattie Louise Bacon, had seven children. Weidler Street in northeast Portland is named in his honor.

== Early life ==
George Washington Weidler was born in Lancaster, Pennsylvania, on October 22, 1837, to Isaac C. and Catherine Gaelbach Weidler, U.S. citizens of Swiss-German descent. As a child, he attended school in Lancaster and Mount Joy and a boarding school in Strasburg. For health reasons, he was sent to St. Louis, Missouri, where he became a clerk in a hardware store, then a freight clerk on steamboats plying the Mississippi River between St. Louis and New Orleans, Louisiana. In 1855 he was put in charge of a mule-drawn wagon train, hauling goods to a new general store in Salt Lake City, Utah. There he stayed for three years as a store clerk before becoming a Pony Express agent. In about 1861, Weidler took a job as an agent for a company that ran stagecoaches between Carson City and Virginia City, Nevada. About two years later, he accepted an offer from transportation businessman Ben Holladay to act as purser on a steamboat based in San Francisco, California.

== Transportation, lumber, electricity ==
In 1866 Weidler moved to Portland, acting as the local agent for Holladay's steamship company. Over the coming decades, he became an "active factor in promoting and controlling many of [Portland's] most important business undertakings". He was an early investor in the Oregon Steam Navigation Company (OSN), which controlled shipping and rights-of-way along the lower Columbia River. He was part owner of the Portland Street Railway (PSR), which Holladay built in 1871. A single horsecar line operating along First Street on the city's west side, the PSR was Portland's first street railway and its only one for more than a decade. In 1879 Weidler, who was an agent for the Oregon Steamship Company owned by Henry Villard, became a shareholder in the Oregon Railway and Navigation Company (OR&N), formed by Villard after he gained control of the OSN.

Meanwhile Weidler's Willamette Steam Mills Lumbering and Manufacturing Company, located near shipping docks on the west bank of the Willamette River, had become "Portland's largest and most profitable lumber mill". Adjacent to the OR&N's Ainsworth Dock, it supplied lumber for export to Hong Kong and Australia. At this mill, Weidler became involved in the fledgling electric utility business. In 1880 he set up a dynamo in his sawmill and became

the first person to sell electric lighting in Portland when he ran a primitive transmission line to the nearby Ainsworth Dock in 1881. Within three years he was instrumental in organizing the U.S. Electric Lighting and Power Co. which operated off of steam generated [sic] dynamos. His three associates were to be the prime movers in the early development of the Portland electric utility industry: L.L. Hawkins, P.F. Morey and F.V. Holman.

The assets of U.S. Electric were transferred to Willamette Falls Electric Co., organized by Morey in 1888, which in 1889 "introduced to the United States the first long-distance (13 miles) [21 km] commercial transmission of direct current hydro-electric power." (Note: In 1892, Morey, Frederick V. Holman, and Henry Failing formed the Portland General Electric Co., which acquired the assets of Willamette Falls Electric. Supplying power to the region's electric railway system, PGE was merged with other utilities in 1906 to form Portland Railway, Light and Power Company, part of which took the name Portland General Electric again after further reorganization in 1930.)

In 1891 the Oregon Legislative Assembly established the Port of Portland Commission to maintain shipping channels, a drydock, and other infrastructure and services related to maritime and commercial interests in the city. Membership on the commission "was considered a high honor, reserved for representatives of the city's leading families". Weidler was among those appointed to the commission.

== Family and later life ==
G. W. Weidler and his wife had seven children, five of whom lived to adulthood. The Weidlers lived in a large house built in 1885 on Northwest 19th Street between Kearney and Lovejoy streets. (Note: Central Portland lies on the west side of a bend in the north-flowing Willamette River. With few exceptions, its north–south streets (called avenues in the 21st century) are numbered in ascending order beginning west of Front Street (later named Naito Parkway), which runs along the river. In the northwest quadrant of the city, the east–west street names are alphabetical in ascending order beginning with Burnside Street. The Weidler residence was about 19 blocks west of the river and 10 blocks north of Burnside.) The mansion featured a mixture of Queen Anne, Italianate, and Gothic Revival features. Its main floor was almost a full story above grade; it had two unusually tall first and second stories, a steeply pitched roof over a half-story attic, and a four-story tower above the entrance. The house shared the block with a modified Italianate villa belonging to his father-in-law; driveways through the block connected to stables on Twentieth Street. Designed by architect Warren H. Williams, both houses "have been gone for many years".

Late in life Weidler joined the Episcopal Church, where his father-in-law was a prominent member and vestryman. Weidler belonged to the Arlington, Portland, and Commercial clubs. He died of a stroke on September 19, 1908, in Portland. Weidler Street in northeast Portland is named after him.

== Notes and references ==
Notes

== Works cited ==
- Gaston, Joseph (1911). Portland, Oregon, its history and builders: in connection with the Antecedent Explorations, Discoveries, and Movements of the Pioneers That Selected the Site for the Great City of the Pacific, vol. 2. Chicago, Illinois: The S.J. Clarke Publishing Company. OCLC 1183569
- Hawkins, William J., III, and Willingham, William F. (1999). Classic Houses of Portland, Oregon: 1850–1950. Portland, Oregon: Timber Press. ISBN 0-88192-433-4
- MacColl, E. Kimbark; Stein, Harry H. (1988). Merchants, Money, and Power: The Portland Establishment 1843–1913. Portland, Oregon: The Georgian Press. ISBN 0-9603408-4-X
- MacColl, E. Kimbark. (1976). The Shaping of a City: Business and Politics in Portland, Oregon, 1885 to 1915. Portland, Oregon: The Georgian Press. OCLC 2645815
- Marlitt, Richard. (1978) [1968]. Seventeenth Street, revised ed. Portland, Oregon: Oregon Historical Society. ISBN 0-87595-000-0
