= Marie Boozer =

American socialite and countess (c.1846–1908)

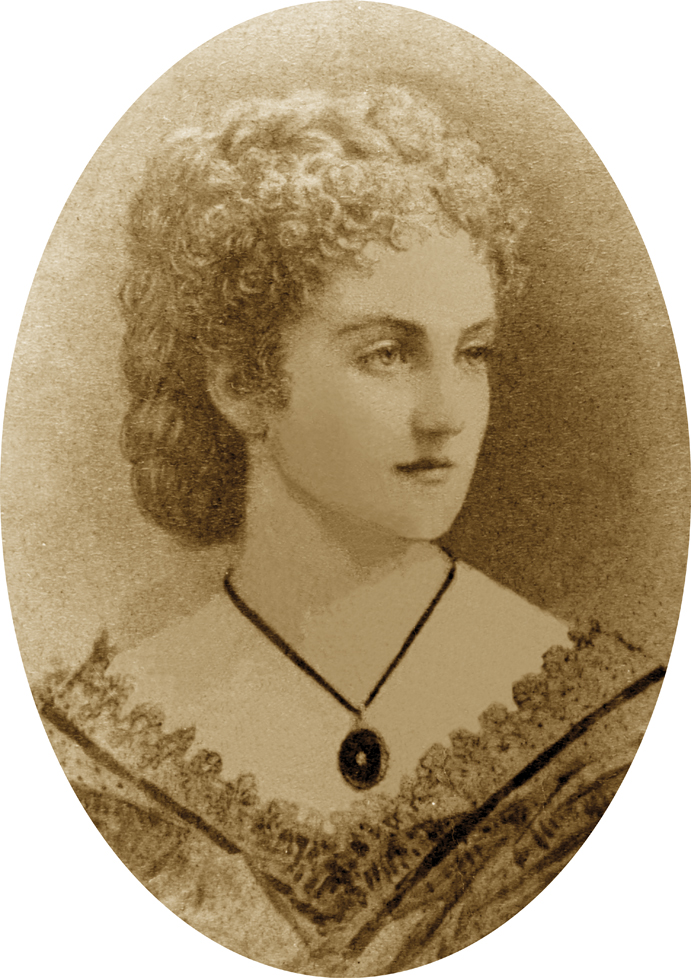
- Marie Boozer, Countess de Pourtalès-Gorgier, ca. 1876, Wilson-Battle-Connell-Park papers. Reproduced with the permission of Deborah C. Pollack from the cover of her book, Bad Scarlett: The Extraordinary Life of the Notorious Southern Beauty Marie Boozer, published by Peppertree Press in 2017.
- Born: Mary Amelia Peter Burton, later Mary Sarah Amelia Boozer (in November 1848); December 1846; Columbia, South Carolina, US
- Died: 25 January 1908 (aged 61); Tuscany, Italy
- Other names: Mary Sarah Amelia Boozer; Marie Beecher; Marie Adele de Beauvoir Boozier, Countess de Pourtalès-Gorgier
- Occupation: Diplomatic spouse
- Known for: South Carolina belle during the American Civil War
- Spouses: John S. Beecher; Arthur de Pourtalès
- Children: 1

Marie Boozer (1846 – 1908) was an American socialite and countess. From provincial antebellum South Carolina, she escaped with the Union army to New York and ascended into high society. After her divorce she became a member of the Paris demimonde before marrying a count/diplomat and traveling the world. In the process she became an early example of a celebrity pursued by gossip and rumors.

== Parentage ==
Marie Boozer was from a very patriotic family. Her mother was born Amelia Sees in Philadelphia on 30 January 1819. Amelia's grandfather emigrated from France with his Huguenot family and fought as a lieutenant in a Philadelphia militia during the American Revolution. Her father, George Sees, was a Philadelphia constable. Amelia's mother, Mary Carr Sees came from Northern Ireland and Amelia's maternal uncle was the renowned Philadelphian Robert Carr, who knew Benjamin Franklin, fought as a lieutenant colonel in the War of 1812, and printed multiple volumes of one of the first English language bibles in America.

In 1837, 18-year old Amelia's first marriage was out of pity for a gravely-ill Thomas Harned on his deathbed, who died the next day. She met an older South Carolina businessman Peter Burton, who was visiting Philadelphia, and married him in 1840. They returned to Columbia, where Burton died of a seizure sometime in 1846, leaving Amelia several months pregnant. Mary Amelia Peter Burton was probably born in December 1846. The 1850 census gave her age as three and the 1860 census gave thirteen. (Note: The 1848 and 1850 birthdates for Boozer in some sources were clearly incorrect, considering the 1848 name change by David Boozer and the consistent early census data.)

Amelia moved to nearby Newberry and married David Boozer in September 1847. David had the child's name changed to Mary Sarah Amelia Boozer in November 1848. In February 1850, David killed himself while Amelia was at church, leaving a substantial estate of $10,000 to $15,000. (Note: A church hearing cleared Amelia of accusations that she drove Boozer to suicide or was having an affair with Dr. Hugh Toland.)

Amelia returned to Columbia with her child. She was the subject of gossip and worked as a seamstress, so for that and other reasons, she could not join in Columbia's highest social circles. She married Jacob Feaster in 1852. They had three children and the third half-sister Ethland was important in Marie Boozer's life. The Feaster family was doing well financially and Jacob Feaster loved young Marie Boozer.

== Early life in South Carolina ==
Marie Boozer's mother Amelia Feaster in oil painting. Photo used without permission from Deborah C. Pollack, Bad Scarlett: The Extraordinary Life of the Notorious Southern Beauty Marie Boozer (Peppertree Press, 2017), page 49. Painting and photograph property of a private collection.

All agreed that the young Marie Boozer was an exceptional beauty with thick strawberry-blonde hair and deep blue eyes. The popular Southern historian Manly Wade Wellman later wrote that she was the basis for the character of Scarlett O'Hara. The diarist Mary Chesnut gossiped about Boozer's inaccurate illegitimacy but conceded that "She is a beauty—that none can deny." When younger, she was hoydenish or tomboyish as well as adept with firearms. Boozer was a day student at Columbia Female College in 1860, where all grades had access to French language instruction. Boozer still had considerable wealth inherited from David Boozer and during the Civil War she attended the Academy of Sacred Heart for one term in New York, where her mother had relatives. This elite school put heavy emphasis on French conversational skills. Boozer studied in Paris during 1863-1864 and, because she loved the French culture, changed her name to Marie. She then returned to Columbia.

Before the Civil War, debate in South Carolina between Accommodationists and Secessionists was acceptable. Once the war started, Unionists like Amelia were increasingly unpopular. Boozer supported the Confederacy in the early years of the war, tending the Confederate wounded at Wayside Hospital and engaging at morale-boosting activities.

There was a jail in town and a prison called Camp Sorghum west of Columbia for Union officers who were prisoners-of-war. Some of these prisoners were moved to the grounds of the Lunatic Asylum. Amelia went to all those places to help the prisoners who lived in wretched conditions and Boozer, as a dutiful daughter, joined her work. While doing so, Boozer fell into a deep but chaste romance with a young prisoner, Naval Lieutenant and hero Samuel W. Preston. An emissary to President Abraham Lincoln, Preston was handsome, well-educated, gentlemanly, and reciprocally in love with Boozer. Before Preston was released in a prisoner exchange, he and Marie made plans to marry. But tragically, Preston was killed in action during the battle of Fort Fisher in January 1865.

== Flight north with Union Army ==
Preston's death precipitated the heartbroken Marie to join her mother completely in supporting the Union cause. The two women saved the lives of numerous officers from Philadelphia, New York, New Jersey, and New England. Union General William Tecumseh Sherman occupied Columbia from 17 to 20 February during his campaign of the Carolinas. During the occupation, a third of Columbia was destroyed by fires of various origin.

As the Union Army approached Columbia, the Confederates started to move the Union Officer POWs away from Camp Sorgham. Some officers escaped, planning to hide until the Union Army arrived; Amelia and Marie hid them in their cellar and provided them with meals until relief arrived for them.

Amelia knew that she would no longer be safe in Columbia when the Union left to continue north. (Note: A coach-maker named Phineas Frazier had also helped the Union POWs. He was whipped, imprisoned and had his head forcibly shaved.) She sent two of her children to stay with her husband's parents in Feasterville and resolved to take Marie, her half-sister Ethland, and Ethland's African American nurse Lizzie north with the Union army. General Howard himself ordered that a better carriage be confiscated for Amelia's use, knowing the rigors of travel on the bad roads. Sherman's army marched about 10 miles each day which was physically demanding for everyone. The Confederates were attacking intermittently on the sides of the column and made a stand at Bentonville. Boozer and her family were fortunate that General Howard allowed them to travel near his general staff, rather than with the camp followers behind the 60,000-man army.

When they reached Fayetteville on 8 March 1865, General Sherman, who acknowledged Amelia and her "beautiful" daughters in his later memoir, directed General Howard to put the four women on a steamship to Wilmington, a port under Union control. By 23 March 1865 Boozer and her family had made their way to Philadelphia, where they reunited with Amelia's relatives and were celebrated by the public, press, and military as Civil War heroines. They soon moved on to Manhattan, where Amelia had investments and more relatives. They were celebrated as Union heroines there as well, with recommendations from important generals, so the Union League Club gave them $10,000 to help them get settled. The senate voted compensation to Amelia for her Columbia losses, but the bill was set aside, along with many similar bills, but they were later compensated. More than thirty Union officers had signed a supporting statement attesting to the women's courage. (Note: It has been purported that one Union officer claimed that Amelia's compensation request was excessive.)

== Kilpatrick and Marie Boozer ==
A false story that Major General Kilpatrick and Marie Boozer romanced on the trip north from Columbia has spread to numerous "memoirs, novels, encyclopedias, and many nonfiction historical narratives."

A 1899 biography of Confederate Lieutenant General Wade Hampton described how his cavalry planned a dawn raid on the camp of his rival, Union cavalry officer Hugh Judson Kilpatrick. This was part of the Battle of Monroe's Crossroads as Sherman's army marched north from Columbia. A rebel scout saw what he thought was a beautiful young woman fitting the description of Boozer (her name was never given explicitly) at Kilpatrick's camp. The dawn raid caught the Federals unaware and Kilpatrick barely escaped, wearing only his "shirt and drawers". The rebel attackers spotted the woman, but they discovered the "fair damsel" was an "old, ugly ... "school-marm" from Vermont, who had availed herself of the assistance of Sherman's army to return to her home." They politely guided her to safety in a ditch as bullets whizzed by.

The story reappeared in the 1915 spurious pamphlet The Countess Pourtales, in the part by University of South Carolina history professor Yates Snowden, writing under the pseudonym "Felix Old Boy". However, Snowden leaves out the humorous conclusion, giving the impression that it really was Boozer, rather than an older female schoolteacher, at Kilpatrick's camp.

By 1956, a highly respected book on the Carolina campaign transforms the older female schoolteacher into "a lovely young woman in nightdress". It concludes "In all probability, it was the beautiful Mary Boozer ..."

Since 2000, some historians have pushed back against the widespread false rumor.

- "A still popular tale alleges that Marie and Major Judson Kilpatrick ... had an affair after she left Columbus, but this is nothing more than postwar fiction."
- "Contrary to several recent accounts, Marie Boozer was not at Monroe's Crossroads, nor did she accompany Kilpatrick from Columbia to Fayetteville. ... According to Capt. James H. Miller of the 5th Ohio Cavalry, Kilpatrick's traveling companion was named Alice. She was said to be a Northern schoolteacher whom "Little Kil" was escorting."
- "Indisputable documentary evidence exists that Marie Boozer was not present at Monroe's Crossroads. ... it is therefore safe to conclude that Marie Boozer was not Kilpatrick's Alice."
- "Marie was absolutely not with Kilpatrick during his embarrassing skedaddle or anywhere else during her trip north from Columbia." In fact, the entire Kilpatrick myth is completely destroyed in Deborah C. Pollack's book, Bad Scarlett: The Extraordinary Life of the Notorious Southern Beauty Marie Boozer (Peppertree Press, 2017), and her actual journey north with Gen. Howard's troops is fully described as well.

== Marriage to Beecher ==
Amelia arranged a 1866 marriage between Marie and an older businessman, John S. Beecher. This gave Marie entrée to wealth and the higher social circles in New York, but she did not love Beecher and considered him a "pleasant old man." She gave birth to a son, John Preston, in 1867; Naming him "Preston" was a tribute to her deceased former fiancée from Columbia, Samuel W. Preston.

Boozer's mother Amelia died in 1870, leaving Marie without her guidance.

== Infidelity and divorce ==
Beecher, who was unfaithful to Marie, introduced her to Lloyd Phoenix. Phoenix was handsome, wealthy, socially-connected and a yachtsman. He was a philanderer and falsely promised several times to marry Marie as soon as she divorced Beecher. Marie believed Phoenix and entered into a love affair with him. Beecher found out and commenced divorce proceedings.

Marie fully expected that Phoenix would marry her but he laughed at her and said he had no intention of doing so, following a frequent pattern in his life. On 31 October 1873, the spurned Marie took revenge on Phoenix in a remarkable way. All of the parties involved worked to keep it out of the newspapers, but the full account is explained in detail by Deborah C. Pollack in her book, Bad Scarlett: The Extraordinary Life of the Notorious Southern Beauty Marie Boozer.

Sometime in 1873 or possibly January 1874, Marie and her sister Ethland traveled to St. Petersburg in Russia. They associated with aristocrats and had their photographs taken by a celebrity photographer. Claims that Marie was involved in a Russian diamond theft were simply false.

In December 1873, Marie was staying with Ethland at a hotel in London, and the two sisters became innocently involved in a widely-publicized scandal, which drew more unwanted attention to Marie in New York and London newspapers. Full details are in Pollack's book, Bad Scarlett.

Marie returned to New York in May, 1874 and the divorce was finalized in July 1874. Beecher got custody of John Preston and Marie got alimony. Marie was judged the adulterous party so, under New York law, she could not remarry until Beecher's death.

Marie had been caring for her younger half-sister Ethland, but in 1874 Ethland joined her father Jacob Feaster and two older siblings in pioneer LaGrange, Florida. Ethland maintained correspondence with Marie. (Note: Boozer's half-sister, Ethland, had a successful marriage to Dr. Benjamin Rush Wilson, a prominent doctor in pioneer Florida.)

== A free woman ==
A page in Marie Beecher's Paris Police file, photo used without permission from Deborah C. Pollack, Bad Scarlett: The Extraordinary Life of the Notorious Southern Beauty Marie Boozer (Peppertree Press, 2017), page 133. Photograph owned by the Préfecture de Police, Paris, France, from their secret files.

Marie moved to Paris, where sophisticated Europeans socialized with her despite her reputation. Her apartment became a meeting place for artists, royalty and writers. Her rebellious and lavish lifestyle as well as connection with the Paris demimonde resulted in police attention.

== Marriage to Arthur Count de Pourtalès ==
Her 2nd husband Arthur Count de Pourtalès. Photo used without permission from Deborah C. Pollack, Bad Scarlett: The Extraordinary Life of the Notorious Southern Beauty Marie Boozer, page 138 (Peppertree Press, 2017). Photograph owned by Wilson-Battle-Connell-Park papers.

It is unclear when Marie met a French diplomat of Swiss origin named Count Arthur de Pourtalès-Gorgier, but they were together in London during October 1875. Arthur was handsome, about Marie's age and a "gentleman of the old school in all respects."

Arthur's deceased first wife was Jenny Holladay, daughter of the transportation tycoon Ben Holladay. Marie had known Jenny and her sister Polly (also known as "Cassandra") back at the Academy of the Sacred Heart in Manhattan. Maria de Pourtalès-Gorgier was the only child from the first marriage. Marie formed a strong attachment with her stepdaughter Maria.

Arthur and Marie married in a London church on 4 November 1875. Marie put her rebelle life in Paris behind her and was a faithful world-traveling diplomatic wife for the next thirty years. Her formal name was now Marie Adele de Beauvoir Boozier (as she claimed), Countess de Pourtalès-Gorgier.

Arthur's next assignment was in Washington, D.C. and the couple immediately sailed for New York. Beecher, Marie's first husband, gave Marie permission to marry again. Arthur and Marie married for a second time in Baltimore on 2 May 1876, in deference to Beecher.

== World travel as wife of diplomat ==
Marie, Countess de Pourtalès-Gorgier (the former Marie Boozer) in 1886, photo used without permission from Deborah C. Pollack, Bad Scarlett: The Extraordinary Life of the Notorious Southern Beauty Marie Boozer (Peppertree Press, 2017), page 190. Photograph owned by Wilson-Battle-Connell-Park papers.

Arthur's next diplomatic assignment was in Peking, so Marie, Arthur, and young Maria traveled by train to San Francisco and sailed across the Pacific. During 1877, Arthur took a leave of absence, so the three of them could travel in Asia. They visited other exotic places as well. By early 1878 they arrived in Naples and did sightseeing en route to the Chateau de Gorgier in Switzerland.

By 1880, Arthur was promoted to "first class of his diplomatic service" for his achievements. By 1882 they were in Santiago de Cuba and then in 1883 the posting was Buitenenzorg in Indonesia. The Krakatoa volcano exploded during their stay. Marie described her travels and appreciation for international cultures in several letters to Ethland.

In admiration of his service, the French government decorated Arthur with the title of Chevalier de la Légion d'honneur, one of the highest honors in Europe. Marie's skill in the diplomatic social circuit was a major factor in Arthur's success.

From 1894 to 1898, Arthur, Marie, and Maria were in Tokyo, where they were beloved, and where he was chargé d'affaires and secretary to Francois-Jules Harmand, the plenipotentiary French minister to Japan. (Note: Arthur, Marie, and Maria took a break from Tokyo in 1895 by visiting France and the U.S.) In August 1898, the couple sailed from New York to Le Havre. From there they took a train to Paris and were entering Rouen when Boozer was seriously injured, described in detail in Bad Scarlett: The Extraordinary Life of the Notorious Southern Beauty Marie Boozer.

== Gossip, calumnies and hoaxes ==
The South Carolina journalist Julian Selby was an early enemy of Marie and Amelia with his specious 1878 booklet A Checkered Life. (A Checkered Life was reprinted in 1915 as part of The Countess Pourtales.) It was a mixture of a few half-truths and countless total fabrications. Selby felt Amelia and Boozer were disloyal to Columbia and did not meet the standards of "southern womanhood". Selby resented Amelia getting compensation for lost property in Columbia while the ruined Columbia struggled without help.

Early attacks came from the hostile reporters of the San Francisco Chronicle, under the influence of Ben Holladay, a powerful West Coast businessman. He wanted custody of his granddaughter Maria de Pourtalès and sought to portray Marie as an unfit stepmother.

Hoaxes occurred frequently in newspapers during the 1870s to the 1890s. On 27 October 1884, the New York Times reported that Marie had been strangled with a bowstring in Japan for an indiscretion, when she hadn't even been there yet. Two days later, the New York Times had to retract the whole story, saying that Marie was alive and well with Arthur in Switzerland. Other ridiculous stories had Marie married to the Ottoman Sultan or becoming a Zulu in Africa. These newspaper attacks continued through Marie's entire marriage to Arthur.

Two 'historical' novels were written about Marie Boozer. Another Jezebel by Nell S. Graydon was released in 1958. Elizabeth Boatwright Coker's La Belle, released in 1959, was a best-seller. Coker relied mostly on the spurious Julian Selby pamphlet, "A Checkered Life," reprinted as "The Countess Pourtales. Ethel Battle, daughter of Marie's half-sister Ethland, contacted Graydon and Coker over the negative portrayal of Marie and her mother, Amelia. Battle shared letters from and about Marie that showed the truth about her, and also educated the two authors about Amelia. Both novelists expressed regret that their hurtful portrayal of Marie and Amelia had been distorted by limited source materials.

== Last years ==
After traveling the world and helping Arthur with diplomatic duties, Marie lived out her last years with her husband at the twenty-five room Villa Terrarosa in Tuscany, located three miles outside Florence. The Villa Terrarosa had a fine view of the Duomo's dome in the distance.

Marie, Countess de Pourtales-Gorgier, received the last rites of the Catholic Church and died on 25 January 1908. The location of the burial on January 31 was not disclosed to the public.
