= Arthur de Pourtalès =

Swiss-French diplomat

Arthur de Pourtalès, Count de Pourtalès-Gorgier (31 August 1844 – 1928) was a Swiss-French diplomat.

== Early life ==
Pourtalès was born in Gorgier in the Canton of Neuchâtel, Switzerland on 31 August 1844. He was a son of Anne Marie, Countess d'Escherny (1820–1901) and Henri, Count de Pourtalès-Gorgier (1815–1876), the last Lord of Gorgier. Among his siblings were sisters Marie de Pourtalès (who became a Countess of the Charité de Saint-Vincent de Paul), Émilie de Pourtalès (the wife of Baron Étienne Renouard de Bussière), and Louise de Pourtalès (wife of Count Raymond Charles de Geoffre de Chabrignac).

His paternal grandparents were the former Anne Henriette de Palézieux-Falconnet (niece of U.S. Senator William Hunter) and James-Alexandre de Pourtalès, a Swiss-French banker, diplomat and art collector who built the Pourtalès mansion and served as chamberlain to the King of Prussia Frederick William III. His grandfather acquired the seigneury of Gorgier, including the Château de Gorgier, in 1813 as well as the Château de Bandeville and Château de Luins. Among his large extended family was aunt Élisa Calixte de Pourtalès (wife of Charles-Alexandre, Marquis de Ganay) uncle Edmond de Pourtalès (husband to Mélanie (née de Bussière) de Pourtalès, lady-in-waiting to Empress Eugénie, wife of Napoleon III).

== Career ==
Pourtalès succeeded his father as the 3rd Count de Pourtalès on 31 July 1876. Throughout his diplomatic career, he served in various roles, including as the French Consul at Newcastle in England, and the Secretary to the French legation in Washington, D.C. and in Buitenzorg in Indonesia. He also served as the Minister Plenipotentiary of France to Guatemala.

== Personal life ==
Pourtalès was twice married to American heiresses. His first marriage was to Jenny Lind Holladay (1851–1873) on 6 December 1869 at the Château de Gorgier. Jennie's father, Ben Holladay, owned the Pony Express and created an overland stagecoach route during the California Gold Rush, earning him the nickname "Stagecoach King." Jennie's sister Cassandra married Baron Henri de Bussière (a relative of his aunt Mélanie de Pourtalès). Before her death on a train on 15 May 1873, they were the parents of one daughter:

- Marie Pauline Louise "Jenny" de Pourtalès (1871–1912), who married Antoine Grubissich de Keresztúr in Japan in 1898. He later became the first secretary to the Austrian legion of the Austrian-Hungarian empire and later Consul-General in Tunis.

After his wife's death in 1873, while in Baltimore, Maryland, he met and became engaged to Marie Boozer (1852–1908), a stepdaughter of David Boozer and the former wife of John S. Beecher, with whom she had a son, John Preston Beecher (later the U.S. Vice Consul in Le Havre and Consul at Cognac). Marie was also, purportedly, the lover of Union Gen. Hugh Judson Kilpatrick. They were married on 2 May 1876. After their wedding, they went to Shanghai and Hong Kong where they were entertained by Governor John Pope Hennessy before returning to France. She claimed to be a daughter of Beauvar-Boosier, Esq. of New Orleans. Actually her natural father was Peter Burton of Columbia, South Carolina.

The Countess de Pourtalès died 25 January 1908 at their twenty-five room Villa Terrarossa near Toscana, just three miles from Florence in Italy. Count de Pourtalès died twenty years later in 1928.
