= Bob Lipscomb =

English cricketer

Personal information
- Full name: Robert Lipscomb
- Born: 28 February 1837; Penshurst, Kent
- Died: 8 January 1895 (aged 57); Tudeley Hale, Kent
- Batting: Right-handed
- Bowling: Right-arm fast
- Role: Bowler
- Relatives: Frank Lipscomb (son)

Domestic team information
- Years: Team
- 1862–1873: Kent
- FC debut: 11 August 1862 Kent v England XI
- Last FC: 25 August 1873 Kent v Sussex

Career statistics
Competition	First-class
Matches	60
Runs scored	428
Batting average	4.97
100s/50s	0/0
Top score	22
Balls bowled	10,943
Wickets	271
Bowling average	17.01
5 wickets in innings	19
10 wickets in match	3
Best bowling	9/88
Catches/stumpings	17/–
- Source: ESPNcricinfo, 8 May 2021

Robert Lipscomb (28 February 1837 – 8 January 1895) was an English amateur cricketer. He played 60 first-class cricket matches, mostly for Kent County Cricket Club, between 1862 and 1873.

== Early life ==
Lipscomb was born at Penshurst in Kent, the son of Robert and Elizabeth Lipscomb. His father was a farmer and, after being educated at Rocky Hill House School in Maidstone, Lipscomb followed in his father's footsteps and farmed for much of his life, initially at East Peckham. He suffered financially during the agricultural depression of the 1870s and later worked as a hop factor at Leigh.

== Cricket ==
As a cricketer, Lipscomb was a fast bowler, playing as an amateur when his work allowed him to. He has been described as a "valuable addition" to the Kent bowling attack who often played at his best during Canterbury Cricket Week, the social highlight of the county's cricketing year. A well-built man, Lord Harris described him as the "fiercest of bowlers" and Lipscomb took 206 wickets in his 48 first-class matches for Kent. His Wisden obituary described him as "one of the fastest and straightest amateur fast bowlers of his day".

After impressing whilst playing for Town Malling, Lipscomb's first-class debut was for Kent against an England XI during the 1862 Canterbury Cricket Week. He played first-class cricket in every season until 1873, making a total of 60 appearances. He also played for Gentlemen of Kent and other amateur teams. His best bowling performance came in 1871 against Marylebone Cricket Club (MCC) at Lord's when he took nine wickets for the cost of 88 runs (9/88), including bowling six batsmen.

== Family and later life ==
Lipscomb married Lucy Richmond in 1859; the couple had five children. One of their sons, Frank Lipscomb, played first-class cricket, mainly as a fast bowler for Kent in the 1880s before emigrating to Australia.

Lipscomb served on the General Committee at Kent between 1871 and 1877. He died at Tudeley Hale in Kent in 1895, aged 57.

== Bibliography ==
- Carlaw, Derek (2020). Kent County Cricketers, A to Z: Part One (1806–1914) (PDF). Cardiff: ACS.
