= Ray McManus =

American poet

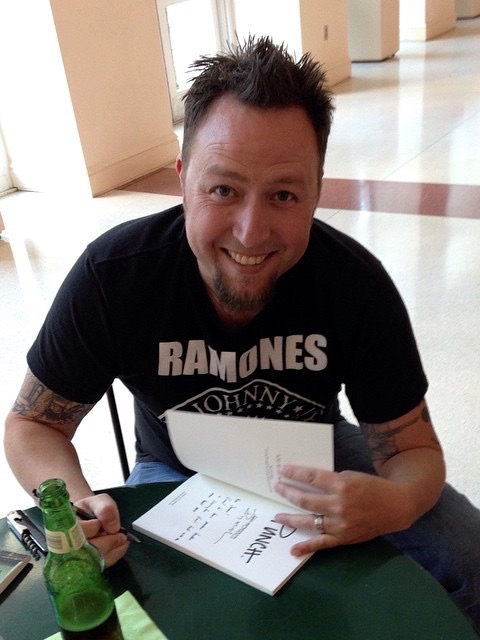
- Born: November 10, 1972 (age 53)
- Education: M.F.A., Ph.D.
- Alma mater: University of South Carolina
- Occupation: Poet
- Writing career
- Notable works: Punch., Red Dirt Jesus, Driving through the country before you are born
- Website: www.raymcmanuspoetry.com

Ray McManus is an American poet with three award-winning poetry collections. He is an associate professor of English at the University of South Carolina Sumter.

== Life ==
McManus was born in Columbia, South Carolina.

He earned his M.F.A. in Poetry in 2000, and his Ph.D. in Rhetoric and Composition in 2006, at the University of South Carolina where he studied under Kwame Dawes and Ed Madden. As a student, he won the 1997 Academy of American Poets Award at the University of South Carolina. In 2008, he joined the faculty at the University of South Carolina Sumter and is an associate professor of English.

== Works ==
McManus's first book, Driving through the country before you are born won the 2006 SC First Book Prize in Poetry, was the winner of the South Carolina Poetry Prize, selected by Kate Daniels, and published with University of South Carolina Press. His second book, Red Dirt Jesus was selected for the Marick Press Poetry Prize in 2011. In 2014, his third collection, Punch. was named best book of poetry in North America published by an independent press in the 2015 Independent Publishers Book Award.

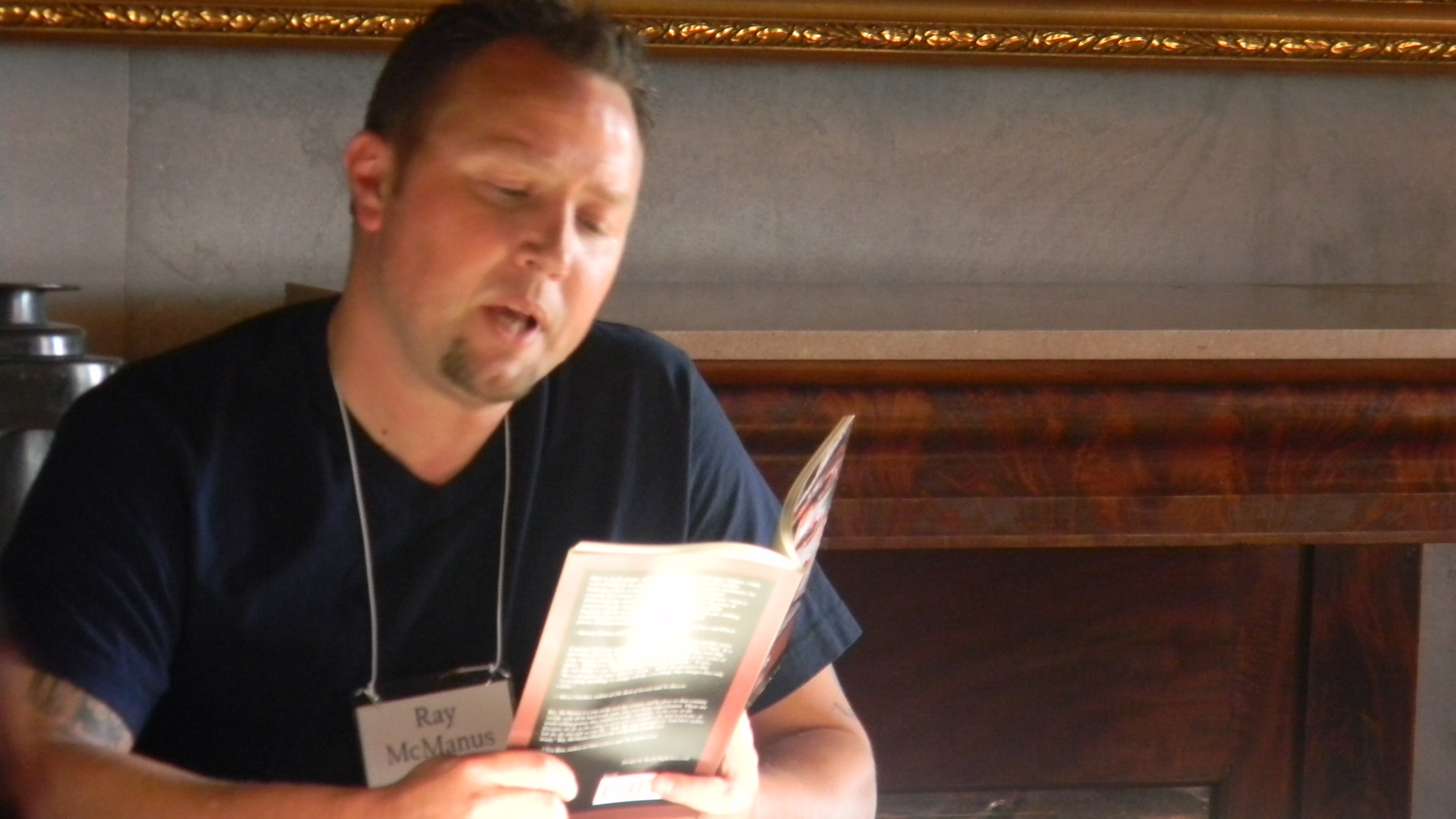
Ray McManus reading at the Southern Festival for the Book, Nashville, 2013

McManus has published poems in Natural Bridge, Cold Mountain Review, Crazyhorse, Nimrod, Ellipsis, Borderlands, The Recorder, Los Angeles Review, Jabberwock, Asheville Poetry Review, Yemassee, Waccamaw, Arkansas Review, The Pinch, Pea River Journal, Barely South Review, moonShine Review, Steel Toe Review, Hayden's Ferry Review, Blue Collar Review, Animal, Town Creek Poetry, Frank Martin Review, Jasper, and Apron Review. His work has been anthologies in Traffic Life, A Millennial Sampler of SC Poets, The Southern Poetry Anthology, Remaking Moby, Seeking Jonathan Green, A Sense of the Midlands, and Hard Lines: Rough South Poetry.

== Publications ==
McManus, Ray (2024). The Last Saturday in America. Spartanburg: Hub City Press. ISBN 979-8885740319.
McManus, Ray (2015). Found Anew: Poetry and Prose Inspired by the South Caroliniana Library Digital Collections. Columbia: University of South Carolina Press. ISBN 978-1611175653.
McManus, Ray (2014). Punch. Spartanburg: Hub City Press. ISBN 978-1938235078.
McManus, Ray (2011). Red Dirt Jesus. Michigan: Marick Press. ISBN 978-1934851326.
McManus, Ray (2007). Driving through the country before you are born. South Carolina: University of South Carolina Press. ISBN 978-1570037023.

== Awards ==
- 2006 South Carolina First Book Prize in Poetry—selected by Kate Daniels
- 2011 Marick Press Prize in Poetry—selected by Alicia Ostriker
- 2015 Independent Publisher Book Award—National

== Links ==
- Southern Literary Review
- Steel Toe Review
- Town Creek Poetry
- Ray McManus Homepage
- Creative Writing at Tri-District Arts Consortium
- Animal: A Beast of a Literary Journal
- Joe Milford Poetry Show 1 of 2
- Joe Milford Poetry Show 2 of 2
