= Oswald Lipscomb =

Oswald Lipscomb (1872–1930) was an American master carpenter.

Two of his works are listed on the U.S. National Register of Historic Places.

Works include:

- Davis-Whitehead-Harriss House, 600 W. Nash St. Wilson, North Carolina (Lipscomb, Oswald), NRHP-listed
- Moses Rountree House, 107 N. Rountree St. Wilson, North Carolina (Lipscomb, Oswald), NRHP-listed
