= Lorraine Lipscombe =

Canadian endocrinologist

- Born: Montreal, Quebec, Canada

Academic background
- Education: Concordia University (BSc); McGill University (MD); University of Toronto (MSc)
- Thesis: Diabetes mellitus and the risk of postmenopausal breast cancer: a retrospective population-based cohort study. (2005)

Lorraine L. Lipscombe is a Canadian endocrinologist. In 2021, Lipscombe was appointed the director of the University of Toronto's Novo Nordisk Network for Healthy Populations.

== Early life and education ==
Born and raised in Montreal, Lipscombe completed her Bachelor of Science degree in psychology at Concordia University where she helped complete research on how hormones affect maternal behaviour in rats. She then completed her medical degree at McGill University in 1998 before enrolling at the University of Toronto for Internal Medicine and Endocrinology residency training, followed by a Master's degree in Clinical Epidemiology, Health Policy, Management, and Evaluation. While completing her master's degree, Lipscombe discovered that there was a bidirectional relationship between breast cancer and diabetes. She also found that women with diabetes received fewer mammograms and had a higher mortality and more advanced stage of breast cancer at diagnosis.

== Career ==
Following her MSc, Lipscombe joined the Department of Endocrinology at Women's College Hospital (WCH) in 2006. Lipscombe is a professor in the University of Toronto's Temerty Faculty of Medicine and Dalla Lana School of Public Health, and was director of the Division of Endocrinology at WCH from 2017 to 2021. While working in these roles, Lipscombe developed a program to assist women with gestational diabetes which included lifestyle coaching on healthy eating and physical activity. She also received funding for her research into why health outcomes were worse for cancer patients who also had diabetes. In 2007, Lipscombe was awarded a Clinician Scientist Award from Diabetes Canada, followed by a New Investigator Award from the Canadian Institutes for Health Research in 2012, and a Diabetes Investigator Award from Diabetes Canada in 2018.

In 2021, Lipscombe was appointed the director of the University of Toronto's Novo Nordisk Network for Healthy Populations.
