= From Safety To Where =

From Safety To Where was a post-punk trio from Columbia, South Carolina, known for its jarring guitar/bass interplay and frantic, screaming vocals. The Joy Division reference in the band's name was only slightly evident in its music, which evolved from terse, minimalist, post-hardcore into dark, melodic post-punk. In 2002, the band signed to Radical Records in New York City, which released their most notable album, Irreversible Trend. The album ranked in the Top 75 of the College Music Journal Top 200 albums chart that July, spawning the college radio hit, "Only Now". Propelled by the appearance of its ethereal instrumental, "Monument" (from Irreversible Trend) on MTV's The Real World and several tours of the East Coast and Midwest in 2002, the band recorded its final album, Interference, over the course of the next two years. However, the band succumbed to a souring internal relationship before it could be released.

== Band members ==
- Eric Greenwood - vocals, bass guitar, keyboards
- Steven Walters - guitar
- Jay Hubbell - drums

== Discography ==
- 1999 - From Safety To Where CD (Old Glory)
- 2000 - Mapping 7-inch EP (Old Glory)
- 2002 - Irreversible Trend CD (Radical)
- 2004 - Interference CD (Unreleased)
