= Lipscomb House =

Plantation house in Durham, North Carolina

Coordinates: 36°07′05″N 78°54′13″W

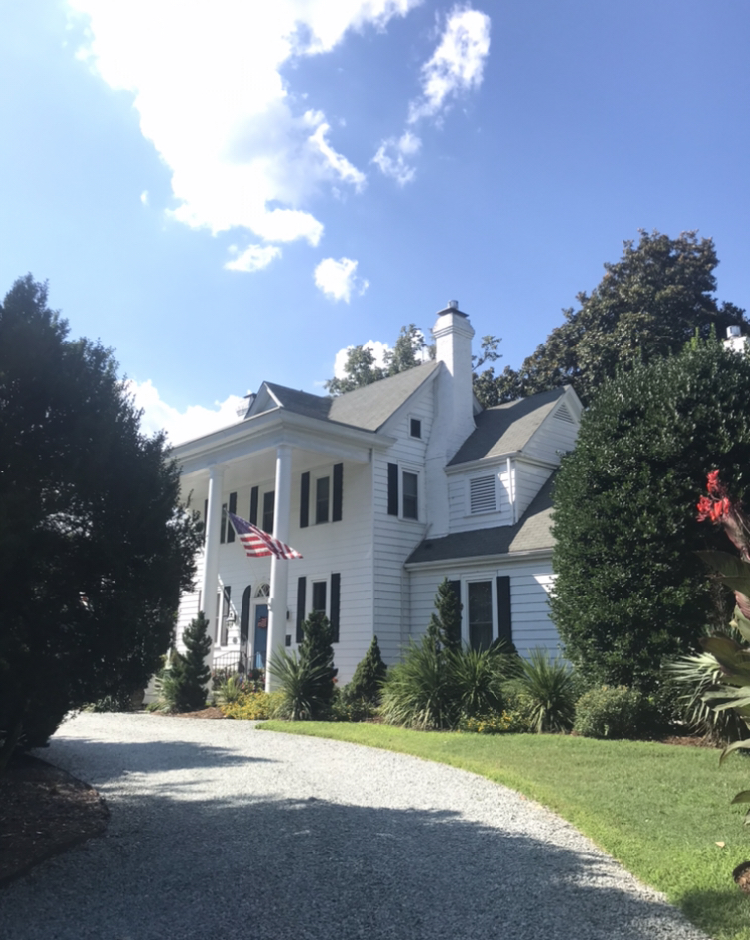
- Lipscomb House in 2020.

General information
- Status: bed and breakfast
- Type: plantation house
- Architectural style: Federal
- Location: 106 Mason Road; Durham, North Carolina, U.S.
- Owner: Brittain family Cain family Davis family Lipscomb family

Lipscomb House, or Lipscombe House, is a historic Federal-style plantation house in Durham, North Carolina, United States. The Lipscomb Plantation, sitting on 2,000 acres between the Eno River and the Little River, was one of the largest forced-labor cotton farms in Durham County. The plantation was part of the Trading Path, used by Catawba and Waxhaw Native American tribes trading between Petersburg, Virginia, and Hillsborough, North Carolina. The house is now run as a bed and breakfast.

== History ==
In 1755, Joseph Brittain received a land grant of more than one thousand acres between the Eno River and the Little River, from John Carteret, 2nd Earl Granville. A two-story house was built on the property in 1775. The land was later transferred from Brittain to William Cain. It passed down through the family to Edward Davis and his wife. In 1834, Davis sold the plantation to John D. Lipscomb, a wealthy planter and textile businessman who was a partner in Alpha Woolen Mills. Around 1835, Lipscomb built a side-gabled Federal-style house, joining it to the earlier house, which then served as a rear wing. Additions were made to the central structure in the early and mid-twentieth century. In 1838 a post office was operated, likely in a store, on the plantation.

The Lipscomb Plantation, with 2,000 acres, was one of the largest cotton plantations in Durham County. John Lipscom, along with Paul Cameron and Fendal Southerland, produced 90 percent of the county's cotton.

The Lipscomb House is now run as a bed and breakfast called the Arrowhead Bed and Breakfast Inn. The name comes from a large stone arrowhead on the property, at the corner of Roxboro and Mason Roads, which marks the route of the Trading Path. The arrowhead monument, built in 1931, commemorates the plantation's role in the trading routes of Catawba and Waxhaw tribes, who traded between Petersburg, Virginia, and Hillsborough, North Carolina.

In 2007, a family reunion was held at the house for descendants of people enslaved on the plantation. Gwendolyn Olson, whose ancestors were enslaved on the plantation, compiled a short history of the slaves on the Lipscomb plantation, which is made available to guests at the Arrowhead Inn.
