= Frank Lipscomb =

English cricketer

Personal information
- Born: 13 March 1863; East Peckham, Kent
- Died: 25 September 1951 (aged 88); Randwick, Sydney, Australia
- Batting: Right-handed
- Bowling: Right-arm fast
- Role: Bowler
- Relatives: Bob Lipscomb (father)

Domestic team information
- Years: Team
- 1882–1884: Kent
- FC debut: 12 June 1882 Kent v Yorkshire
- Last FC: 25 August 1884 Kent v Somerset

Career statistics
Competition	First-class
Matches	18
Runs scored	158
Batting average	6.07
100s/50s	0/0
Top score	28
Balls bowled	2,284
Wickets	52
Bowling average	22.65
5 wickets in innings	1
10 wickets in match	0
Best bowling	5/19
Catches/stumpings	8/–
- Source: Cricinfo, 7 May 2021

Frank Lipscomb (13 March 1863 – 25 September 1951) was an English amateur cricketer. He played 18 first-class matches, mainly for Kent County Cricket Club, between 1882 and 1884.

== Early life ==
Lipscomb was born at East Peckham in Kent in 1863 and educated at Stangrove House School in Edenbridge. He was the son of Lucy and Bob Lipscomb, a farmer who played in 48 first-class matches for Kent between 1862 and 1873.

== Cricket ==
Like his father, Lipscomb was a right-arm fast bowler and was described by Lord Harris as a "tearaway" bowler. He made his first-class debut for Kent against Yorkshire in 1882 at Bramall Lane, being selected despite having played little recognised cricket at the time. He took three wickets on debut, and 27 in total in the eight first-class matches he played in his first season. He played five matches in 1883, taking 17 wickets, and another four for Kent in 1884, taking eight wickets. He was awarded his county cap in 1884.

Lipscomb's best bowling figures in first-class cricket were five wickets for the cost of 19 runs (5/19) against Surrey at Mote Park in 1884, when he and Jimmy Wootton bowled unchanged to dismiss Surrey for 44 on a wicket described by The Times as "treacherous" and on which 24 wickets fell on the same day. Like his father, Lipscomb played as an amateur, and made most of his appearances for Kent, playing 16 of his 18 first-class matches for them. He played club cricket for Tunbridge Wells, Tonbridge Town, and Town Malling. He made appearances for the Gentlemen of Kent, and also a single first-class appearance for the United England Eleven in 1882, and for W. G. Grace's XI in 1884, both against Australian touring teams.

== Personal life ==
After his father lost his farm during the agricultural depression of the 1870s, Lipscomb trained as a brewer at Melbourne Bros brewery in Stamford, Lincolnshire. He emigrated to Australia in 1886, working in the brewing industry before becoming a member of the New South Wales Police Force in 1894. He played some club cricket for Albion Cricket Club at Maitland and is believed to have also played for a police team.

Lipscomb lived with his wife at Randwick in Sydney. He died there in 1951 aged 88.

== Bibliography ==
- Carlaw, Derek (2020). Kent County Cricketers, A to Z: Part One (1806–1914) (PDF). Cardiff: ACS.
