= Ben Holladay =

American businessman (1819–1887)

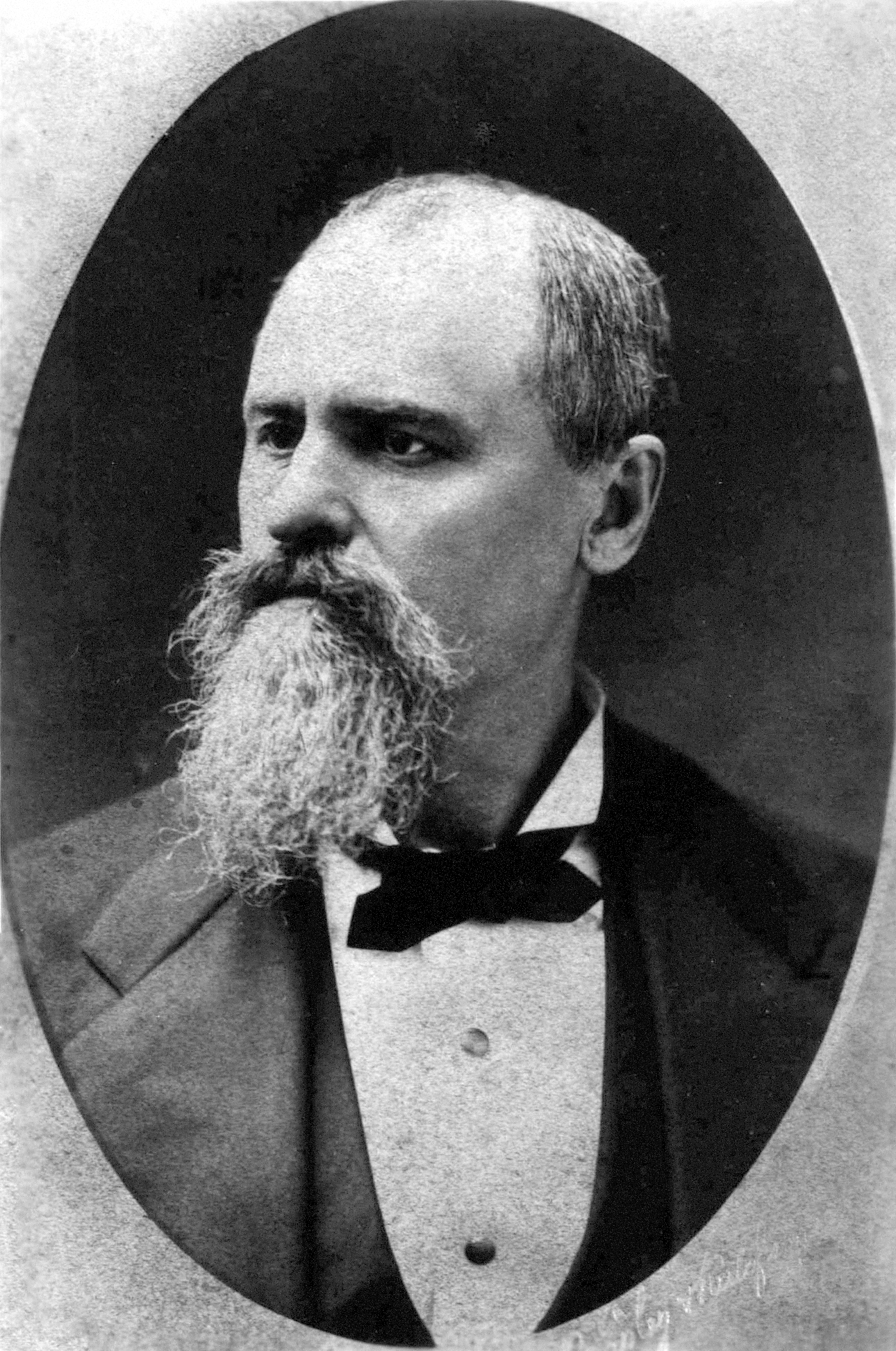
- Born: Benjamin Holladay; October 14, 1819; Nicholas County, Kentucky, U.S.
- Died: July 8, 1887 (aged 67); Portland, Oregon, U.S.
- Occupation: Entrepreneur
- Spouses: Notley Ann Calvert (m. 1839; died 1873) Lydia Esther Campbell (m. 1849)

Benjamin Holladay (October 14, 1819 – July 8, 1887) was an American transportation businessman responsible for creating the Overland Stage to California during the height of the 1849 California Gold Rush. He created a stagecoach empire and is known in history as the "Stagecoach King".

A native of Kentucky, he also was hired as a private courier to General Alexander Doniphan of Missouri, who refused point-blank to carry out orders to kill the Mormons during the 1838 Mormon War in Missouri. Through Holladay's friendship with Brigham Young, Holladay established a profitable freighting contract to Salt Lake City. His transportation empire later included steamships and railroads in Oregon.

== Early life ==
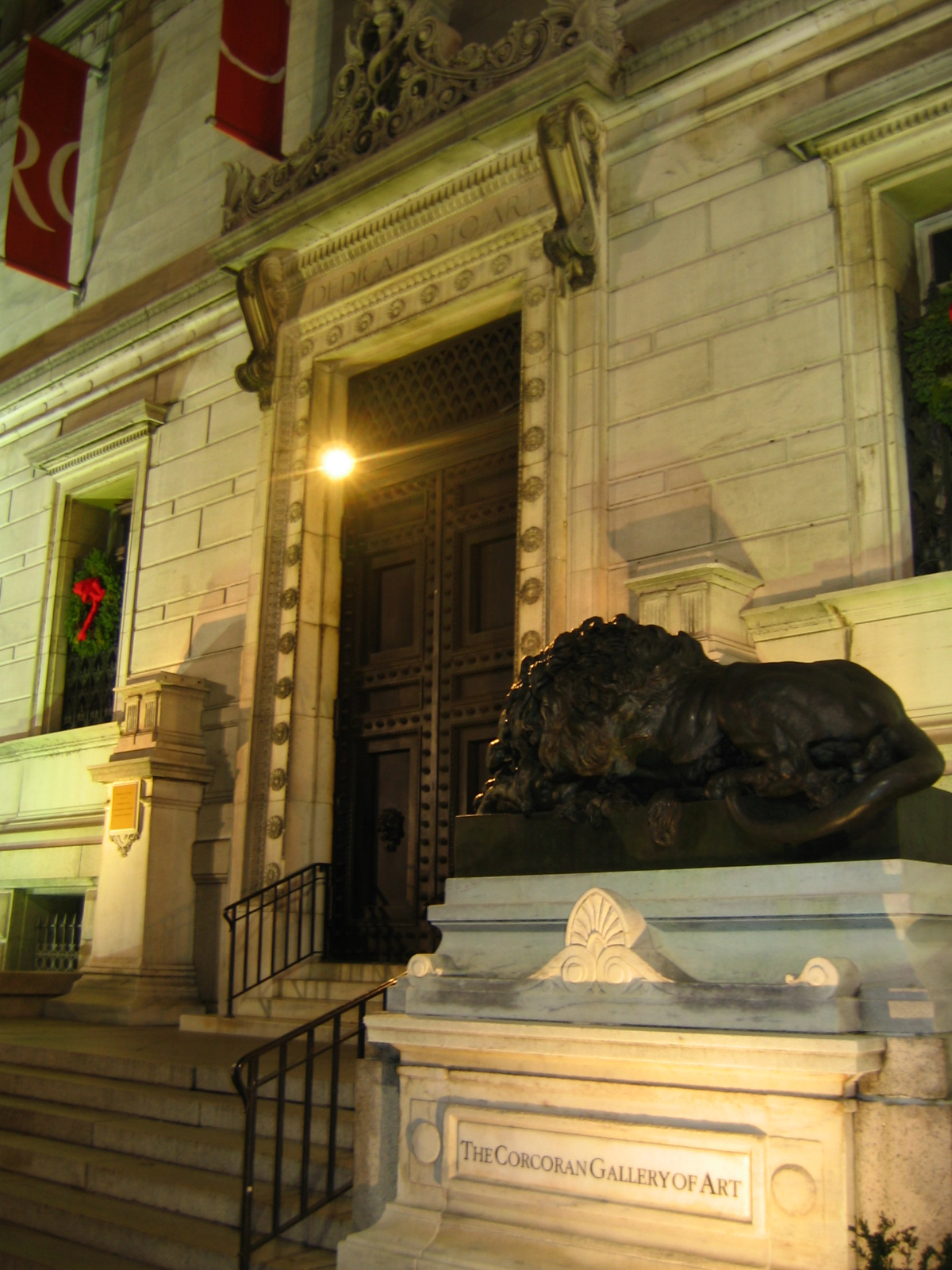
Holladay's lions at the entrance to the Corcoran Gallery of Art

Holladay was born October 14, 1819, in Nicholas County, Kentucky. His father, William Holladay was a third-generation American, descended from John "The Ranger" Holladay. William migrated to Bourbon County, Kentucky, where he was a guide for wagon trains through the Cumberland Gap. Benjamin's mother was Margaret "Peggy" Hughes. Benjamin Holladay learned the freight business at an early age and left home in his late teens for a road trip to Santa Fe in what was then Mexico.

He then settled in Weston, Missouri, where he worked as a store clerk before serving as courier during the 1838 Mormon War for the state militia. After working at the store for a few years he opened a tavern and hotel in 1840, as well as starting what would become the McCormick Distilling Company, which claims to be the oldest distillery still operating in the same location. Business boomed with his supplies for General Stephen Watts Kearney during the Mexican–American War.

== Transportation ==
Holladay moved to California in 1852 where he was to operate 2,670 miles (4,300 km) of stage lines. Holladay acquired the Pony Express in 1862 after it failed to garner a postal contract for its owners, Russell, Majors and Waddell. In 1861, he won a postal contract for mail service to Salt Lake City, Utah, and established the Overland Stage Route along the Overland Trail to avoid confrontations with American Indians on the northern Oregon Trail and Pony Express routes. He added significant infrastructure along the trail, including Rattlesnake Station. Traveling to New York from San Francisco in July, 1862 Holladay was almost killed when the SS Golden Gate sank off Manzanillo.

Between the Overland Trail and six other routes, Holladay received government subsidies totaling nearly $6 million over a four-year period. Holladay sold his stage routes to Wells Fargo Express in 1866 for $1.5 million.

In August 1868, Holladay moved to Oregon, where he had organized the construction of a railroad along the Willamette River, purchasing the illegally incorporated Oregon Central Railroad of Salem, turning it into the Oregon and California Railroad Company. In April 1868, construction started on lines along both the sides of the river.

Holladay's "Eastsiders" completed 20 miles (32 km) of track before the competition, using "every trick known to man" in the construction, including bribing the Oregon Legislature in October 1868. The competition subsequently sold out to him in 1870. Holladay financed the operation via German bankers, who bought $6.4 million of bonds (out of a total $10.95 million).

He won a federal subsidy and built the Oregon and California Railroad as far south as Roseburg, as well as controlling the Willamette River commerce through the Portland Dock and Warehouse Company, the Oregon Transfer Company, and the Oregon Steamship Company.

The Panic of 1873 financial crisis stopped the effort. Holladay lost most of his fortune in the stock market collapse on September 18, 1873. In 1874, Henry Villard was sent by Holladay's German investors when he was behind on bond interest payments. In 1876, Villard took over the railroad.

== Personal life ==
Villard described Holladay as "illiterate, coarse, boastful, false, and cunning." Holladay's attorney, John Doniphan, described him as possessing "many of the characteristics of Napoleon." He was known for having "the bearing of one born to command", and for "being clever, shrewd, cunning, illiterate, coarse, and completely unscrupulous". Joseph Gaston described him as being "wholly destitute of fixed principles of honesty, morality, or common decency." After buying a large home from Doctor Rodney Glisan, "he remodelled it and immediately installed a harem of high class prostitutes."

Holladay and his first wife, Notley Ann Calvert (1824–1873), who he married in 1839, had two daughters who married members of European nobility. Their daughters were:

- Jenny Lind Holladay (1851–1873), who married Arthur de Pourtalès, Count de Pourtalès-Gorgier. Jenny died young and their only child, a daughter, was raised by her father and her stepmother, Marie Boozer.
- Pauline Calvert "Cassandra" Holladay (1853–1877), who married Baron Henri Renouard de Bussière.

After the death of his first wife, he remarried to Lydia Esther Campbell (1849–1889), a daughter of Hamilton Campbell and Harriet (née Biddle) Campbell. They were the parents of:

- Linda Holladay (1879–1944), who married in 1899 Col. Ben Holladay Dorcy Sr. (1869–1926, né Benjamin Dorcy, who changed his name as Benjamin Holladay Dorcy when married). He was the commanding officer of the 7th Cavalry Regiment, 1st Cavalry Division, and was a son of John Chipman Dorcy and wife Caroline Birnie, of Oregon.

Holladay died in Portland, Oregon, on July 8, 1887, and is buried at Mount Calvary Cemetery in that city.

=== Legacy ===
An ordinance came into effect on June 1, 1866, renaming McGaa Street in Denver, Colorado to Holladay to honor the tycoon. At the heart of Holladay Street was Denver's red light district. Concerned relatives petitioned the city to strip Holladay's name from the street, which had become widely known as 'the most sinful street in the West.'

The city passed an ordinance on June 1, 1889, renaming Holladay Street to Market Street, a tongue in cheek reference to the activities that took place there. This brought much concern to the residents on Market in the more respectable areas to the north. In September 1899, the city changed the name of Market Street north of 23rd to Walnut.

In 1870 George Washington Weidler, Trustee for Benjamin Holladay, platted out 'Holladay's Addition,' on 242 acres meeting the east bank of the Willamette River that Holladay had acquired from Portland pioneers Jacob Wheeler and his wife. Holladay intended, in developing the property, to supplant downtown Portland as a business center. He planked Holladay Street, bridged Sullivan's Gulch, and by 1872 erected Clarendon Hotel, on the northwest corner of First Avenue and Flanders Street, "opposite the Oregon-California Railroad ferry landing, and at the northern terminus of the First Street horse car line." The plat included a park, "to be enclosed with a substantial fence." He "continued to maintain and keep the same in repair" until about 1884, when the City of East Portland, Oregon took possession. The 4.5-acre lot is today known as Holladay Park.

== Sources ==
- Ben Holladay: The Stagecoach King, JV Frederick, Arthur C. Clark (1940)
- The Holladay Family, Alvis Milton Holladay (1994)
- Dictionary of Oregon History (February 2005)
- The Expressmen, Time-Life Books (1974)
