= Gorgier Castle =

Castle in Gorgier, Switzerland

Coordinates: 46°54′30″N 6°47′09″E

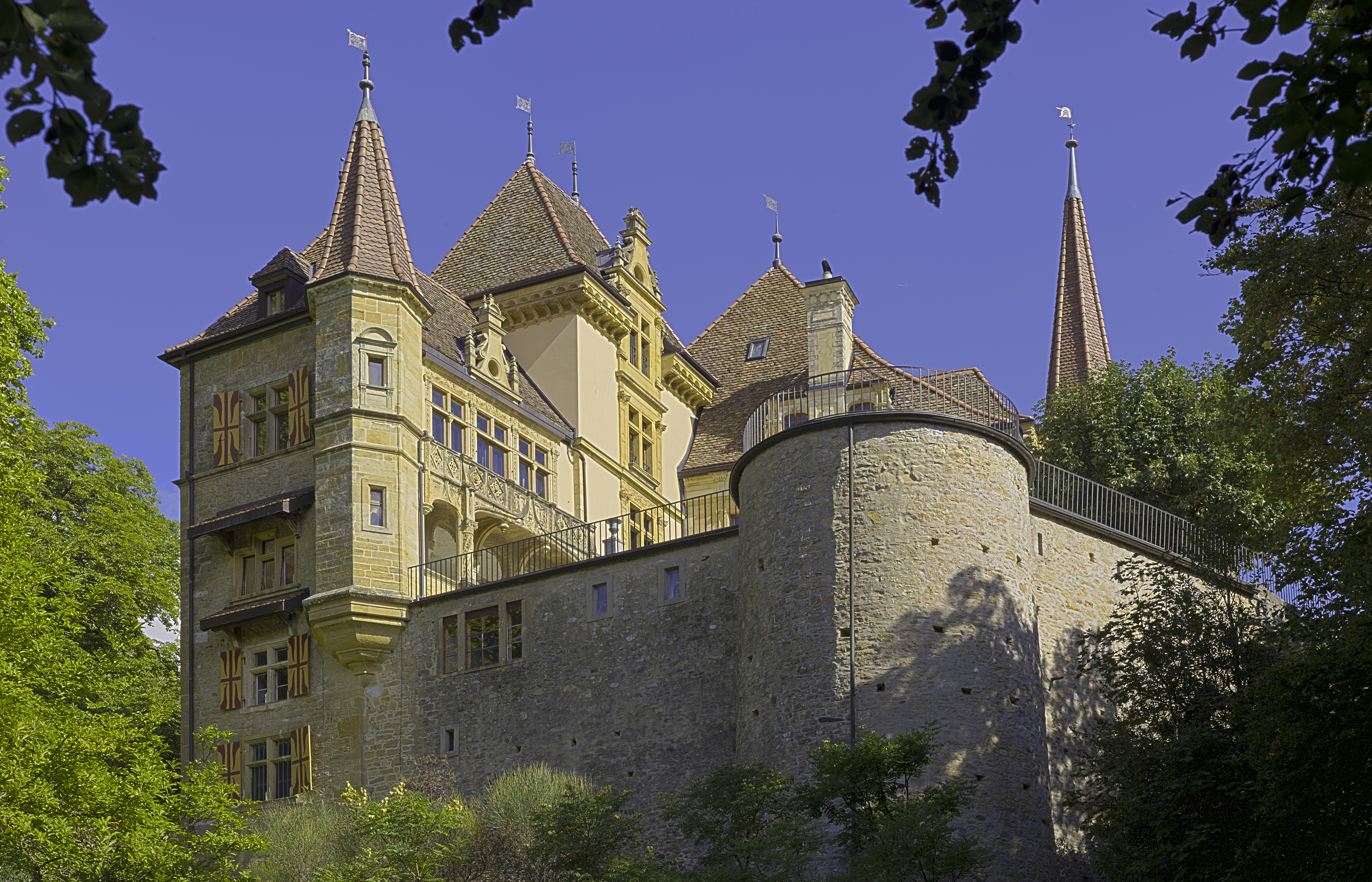
Gorgier Castle

Gorgier Castle (also known as the Château de Gorgier) is a castle in the municipality of Gorgier of the Canton of Neuchâtel in Switzerland. It is a Swiss heritage site of national significance.

== History ==
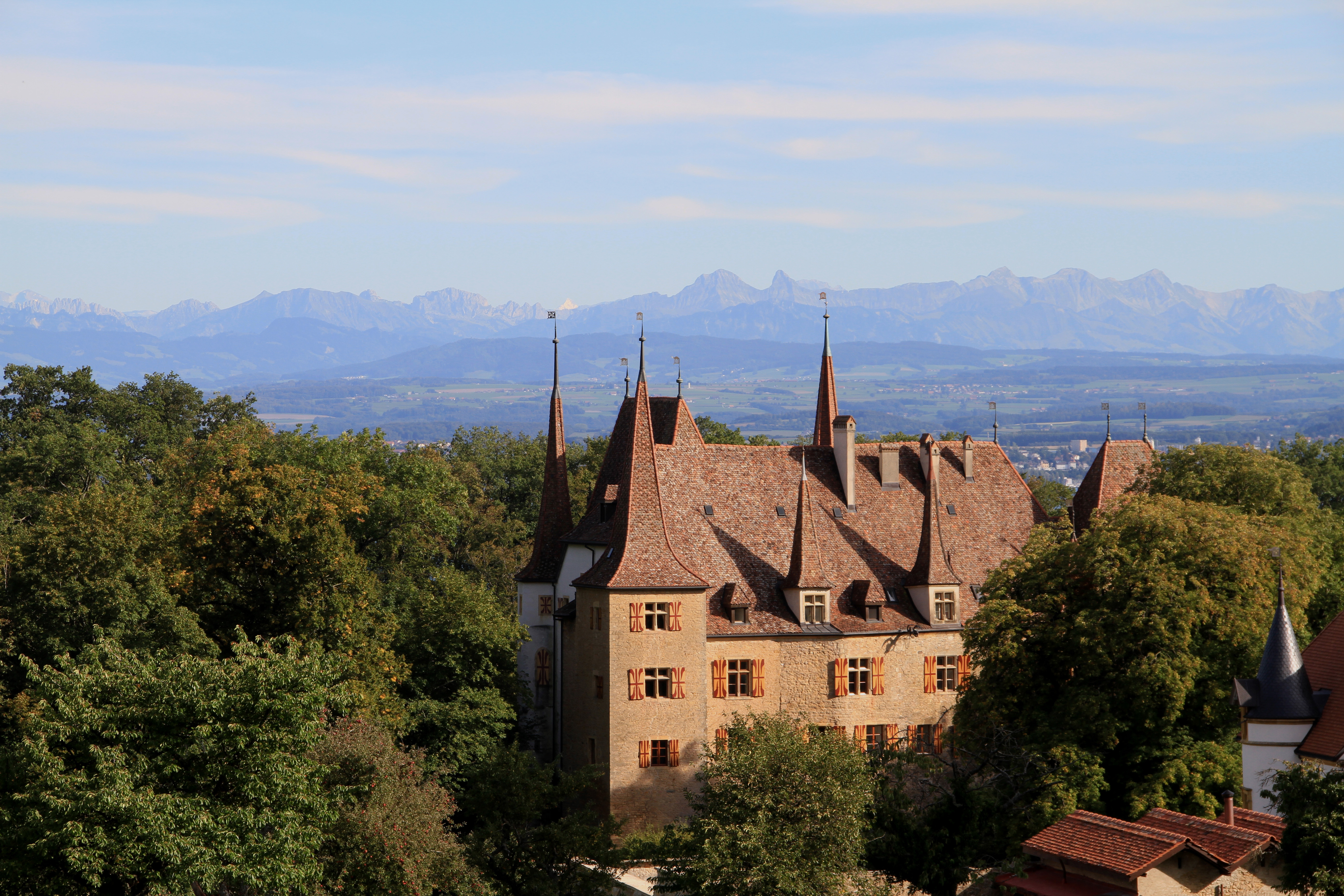
Photograph of the Castle from September 2011

The castle is located close to the city of Neuchâtel and was built around 1620.

In 1813, James-Alexandre de Pourtalès acquired the seigneury of Gorgier. The castle was sold to Alphonse-Henri Berthoud-Coulon in 1879 and then acquired by Swiss-born American banker Antoine Borel in 1897. The Borel family retained ownership until 2001, when it was sold to an American family.

After being fully restored as a family home between 2004 and 2014, the castle was for sale by Sotheby's Realty around August 2014, but is no longer listed.

== See also ==
- List of castles in Switzerland
- Château
