= Taylor Richardson (activist) =

American advocate, activist, speaker, and philanthropist

- Born: July 15, 2003 (age 23); Columbia, South Carolina
- Other name: Astronaut StarBright
- Education: Spelman College
- Alma mater: The Bolles School
- Known for: Advocacy, science, philanthropy

Taylor Denise Richardson (born July 15, 2003; also known as Astronaut StarBright) is an American advocate, activist, speaker, student and philanthropist. She has crowdfunded over $40,000 to send girls to see the films A Wrinkle in Time and Hidden Figures. She attended Space Camp and has expressed interest in becoming an astronaut and doctor.

== Early life ==
Richardson was born in Columbia, South Carolina and attended The Bolles School. Her mother is Latonja Richardson. Richardson is an aspiring astronaut, and admires Mae Jemison. She cites Jemison's book Find Where the Wind Goes, which she read in the third grade, as the source of her interest in space exploration. At the age of nine she attended Space Camp in Huntsville, Alabama. She is a member of The Mars Generation. Richardson is determined to visit Mars.

=== Philanthropy ===
In 2015 she organised "Take A Flight with a Book", delivering books to elementary schools in Jacksonville, Florida. She won the Hands On Jax Youth in Action Award for community service. Richardson was invited to attend a screening of Hidden Figures at the White House, where she met NASA astronaut Yvonne Cagle. Here, "Michelle Obama stated that we have to do the work and that we have to take a seat at the STEM table and bring others with us". In 2016, Richardson raised $18,000 to send girls in her hometown of Jacksonville, Florida, to see Hidden Figures. With the remaining proceeds, Richardson created a scholarship for Kaitlyn Ludlam to attend Space Camp. In 2018 she raised over $50,000 to send 1,000 students to see the film A Wrinkle in Time. She told Good Morning America she came up with the campaigns because "representation matters". Oprah Winfrey agreed to match her funding, bringing the total to $100,000.

=== Honors and recognition ===
Later that year, Richardson met astronaut Mae Jemison at the Clark Atlanta University graduation. She attended the White House United State of Women Summit in June 2016. She was appointed the 2016 "Martin Luther King Jr. Tomorrow’s Leaders Middle School" recipient. In 2017 she was listed in Teen Vogue's "21 under 21". She was also included in Glamour's "17 Young Women Who Created Real Change In 2017". In April 2017 she spoke at the March for Science, where she said "Science is not a boy’s game, it’s not a girl’s game. It’s everyone’s game". She was cast as a "#RealLifePowerpuff" girl by Hulu. She was part of the Lottie Dolls campaign, "Inspired by Real Kids". She featured on the cover of the Girls in Aviation Day September 2017. In October, Richardson's story "Dreaming Big" was the cover story in Scholastic Science World. She is a Generation WOW and W speaker. Mashable described Richardson as the "coolest 14-year-old". She was a keynote speaker at Silicon Republic's Inspire Fest. She was listed as a Young Futurist by The Root.
