= Guy Lipscomb =

American painter (1917–2009)

- Born: April 11, 1917; Clemson, South Carolina
- Died: December 31, 2009 (aged 92)
- Burial place: Trinity Episcopal Cathedral

Guy Fleming Lipscomb Jr. (April 11, 1917 – December 31, 2009) was a business owner, chemist, civic leader, philanthropist, artist, writer, teacher, and star collegiate athlete.

In his later years, he became a painter working in acrylics and watercolors and was both a member of the Southern Watercolor Society and a Signature Member of the American Watercolor Society.

== Personal life ==
Lipscomb was born on April 11, 1917, in Clemson, South Carolina. In 1938, he received his Bachelor of Science degree from the University of South Carolina.

He died on December 31, 2008, at age 92. He is interred at Trinity Episcopal Cathedral in Columbia, South Carolina.

== Career ==
Lipscomb won numerous awards in his lifetime, including the Order of the Palmetto, presented by South Carolina Governor Richard Riley and the 1982 Elizabeth O’Neil Verner Award, presented by the South Carolina Arts Commission.

His works have been shown in the National Academy of Art, the American Watercolor Society in New York City, and in many regional and national competitions.

He taught other artists throughout the United States and Canada.

Lipscomb's book, Watercolor: Go with the Flow, has become a staple in watercolor-instruction classes.

He co-founded South Carolina Watercolor Society and a "force behind the creation of the South Carolina State Museum", and he "significantly shaped the cultural scene in South Carolina".
