= Bored Suburban Youth =

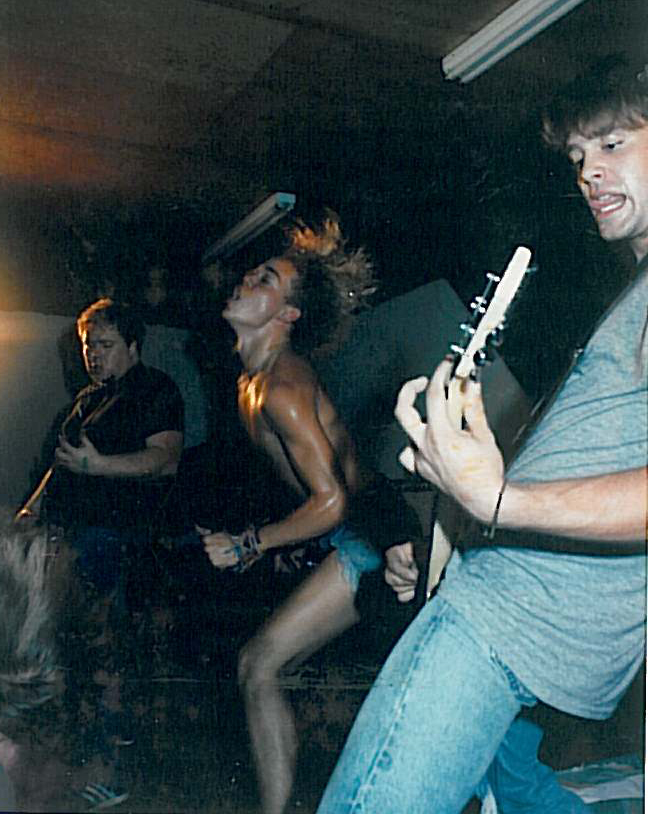
BSY live show, c. 1987

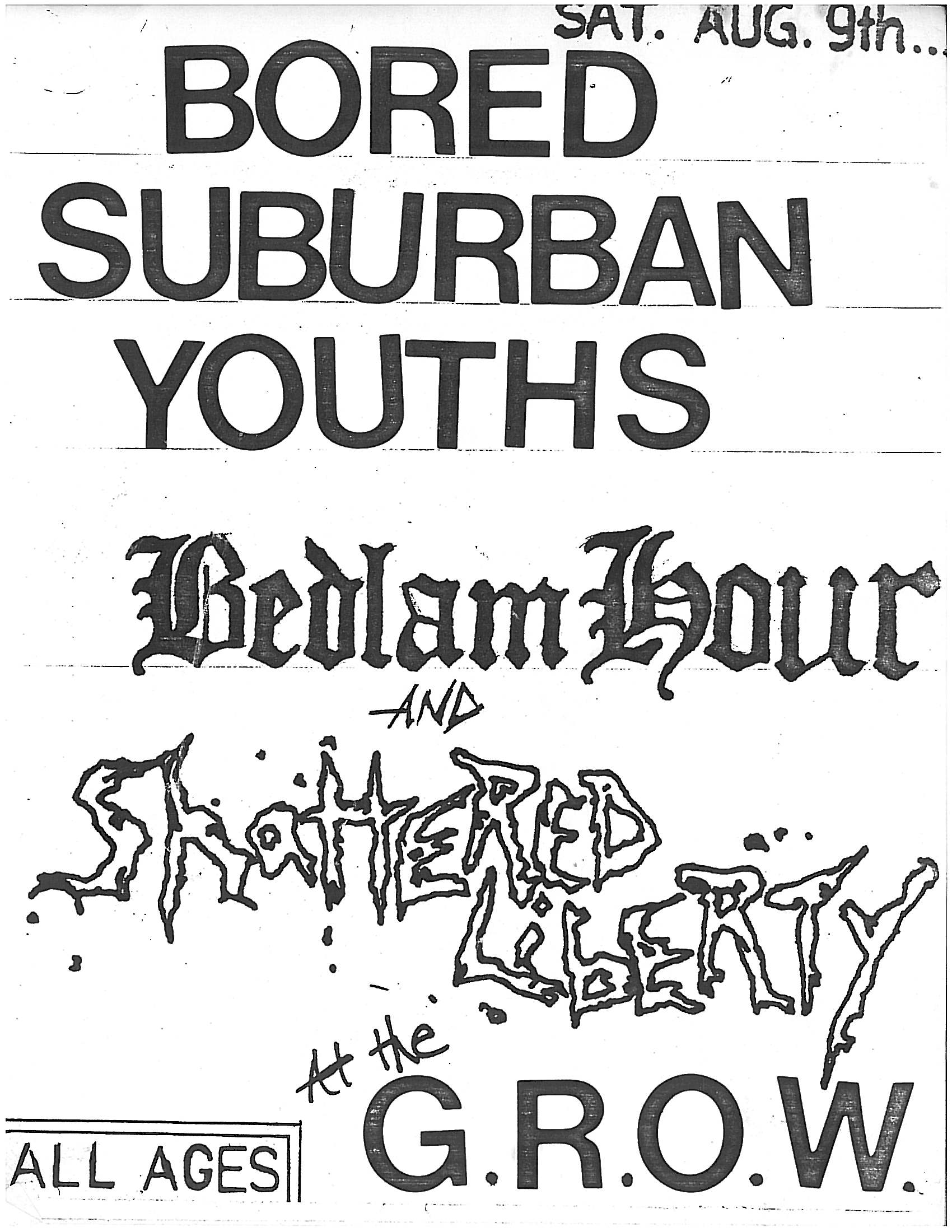
BSY show flyer, circa 1986

Bored Suburban Youth (also known as BSY and Bored Suburban Youths, in the plural rather than collective form) was among the hardcore punk bands that rose up in the Southeastern United States in the "second wave" of the 1980s. Along with bands such as Bedlam Hour, Massappeal and The Sex Mutants, BSY contributed to the nascent punk scene in the decidedly un-punk environs of the politically and socially conservative New South.

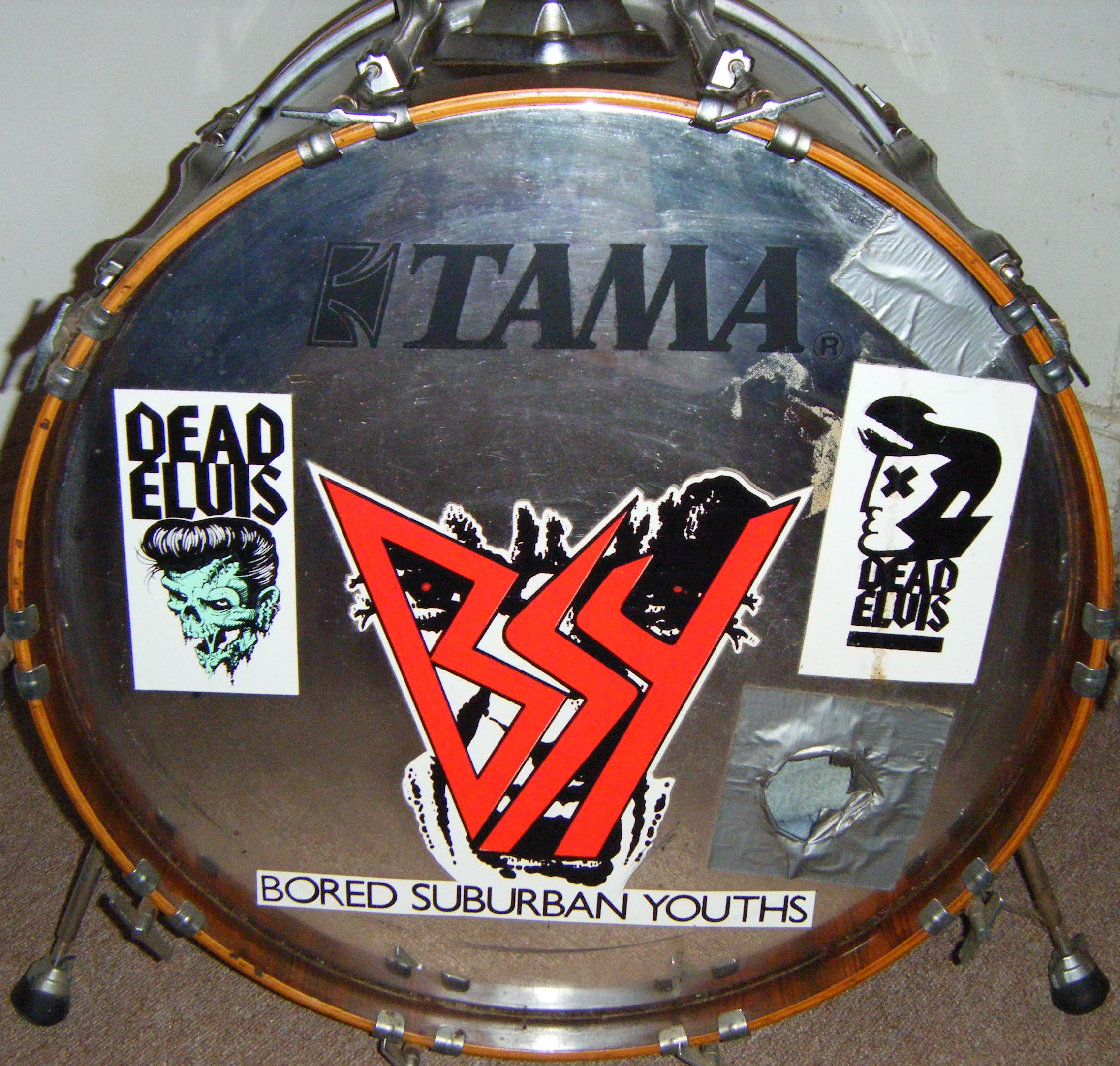
BSY logo on Kenny Jolt's touring kit.

Inspired by an early 1980s Black Flag show, Bored Suburban Youth was formed by a group of students at Irmo High School in the suburbs of Columbia, South Carolina. The original lineup consisted of John Hathaway (guitar), Troy Tague (drums) and Shannon Burgess (bass). An early lineup featured John Dickerson on vocals, but he was soon replaced by Darren Walker, who fronted BSY for nearly all of the band's four-year run. BSY's sound was characterized as having "buzz saw guitars" and "aggressive vocals," though the band themselves referred to their sound as simply "rock'n'roll."

The longest-lived BSY lineup was Hathaway, Tague, Walker, Steve Sonic (guitar) and Brian Molin (bass). The band's work of this era is best captured in the Live at the Drama Lab recordings; another recording featuring this lineup appears on the compilation lp "Method To Our Madness" issued by Phantom Records in 1986. Sonic joined BSY after the disintegration of seminal Orangeburg, South Carolina punk band Red Menace, which had blazed trails of its own in the early 1980s. Later lineups of BSY would feature two other former members of Red Menace: Kenny "Jolt" Gillam (drums) and Carl Van Sewell (bass).

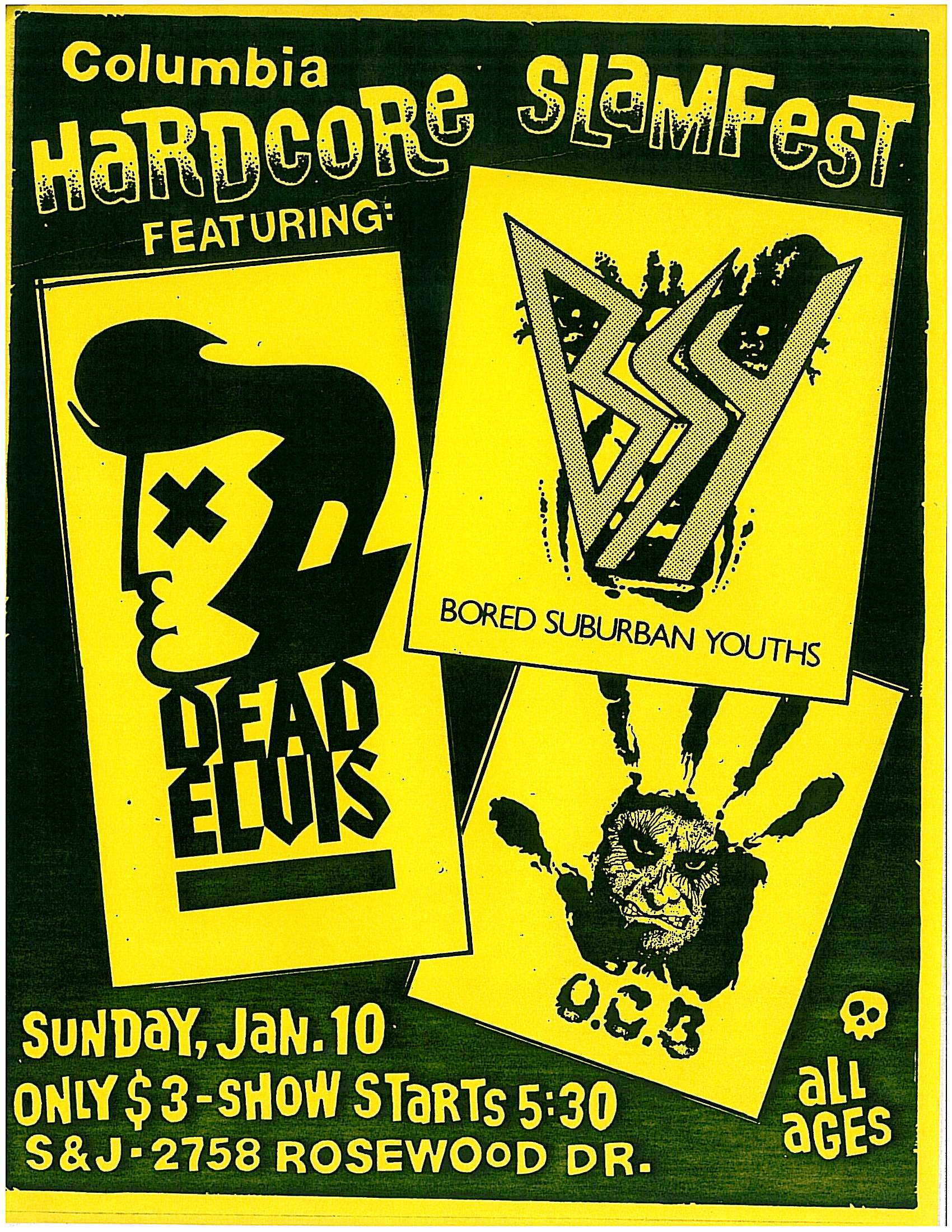
BSY show flyer

Like many punk bands of the time, BSY burned out in a few years, but they made a lasting impact on the Southeastern US punk scene by building up a loyal grassroots following and embracing all-ages venues in the region. To this end, BSY would play anytime, anywhere. This DIY ethic led to shows in barns, lodges, galleries, record shops and even high school theatres.

An 8-song 7-inch record posthumously released under the name Red Menace: Farewell Suburbia marked the end of the band in 1988, but BSY's missionary dedication to the punk ethic gave rise to a vibrant alternative music scene in South Carolina and spawned other original bands spanning many musical genres. In 2014, former BSY drummer Kenny Jolt created a video of the 1988 song "Police State" and posted it on YouTube.

== Vinyl Discography ==
There's a Method to our Madness Various artists (1986)
U.S. release (white cover) on Phantom Records
German release (yellow cover) on We Bite Records.

"Annihilation" (Live) '

Personnel:

- Darren Walker - Vocals
- Steve Sonic - Guitar
- John Hathaway - Guitar
- Troy Tague - Drums
- Brian Mollin - Bass

Engineered by Mike Amos, produced by BSY and Mike Amos. This track was not a live recording, and the actual title was "My Annihilation." It was recorded by Mike Amos in the basement of William's Music in Orangeburg, SC specifically for inclusion on the "Method" album.

Red Menace: Farewell Suburbia (MEP001-A) (1988)

7-inch EP Recorded January 31, 1988, at Sun Sound, Rock Hill, S.C. 8 track recording.

1. Contaminated
2. Driller Killer
3. Sorrow Falling
4. Faces
5. Police State
6. Evolution
7. Living In America
8. The Slide

Personnel:

- Darren Walker - Vocals
- Steve Sonic - Guitar, Backing Vocals
- John Hathaway - Guitar, Backing Vocals
- Carl Van Sewell - Bass, Backing Vocals
- Kenny "Jolt" Gillam - Drums, Backing Vocals

Engineered by Jake Hunter, produced by Red Menace and Jake Hunter Cover layout by Jerry Axson.
