= Marie de Castellane =

- Princess Radziwiłł
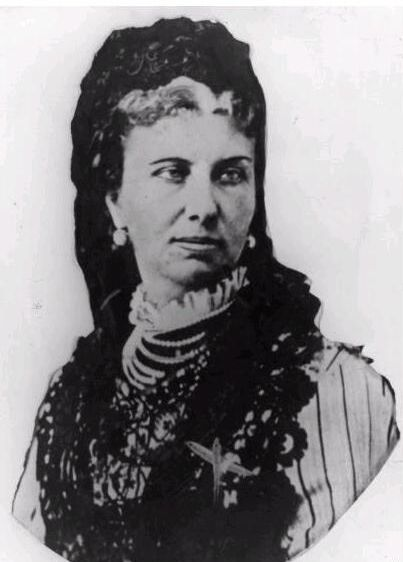
- Born: 19 February 1840; Château de Rochecotte, Saint-Patrice, France
- Died: 10 July 1915 (aged 75); Kleinitz Palace, Lower Silesia, German Empire
- Spouse: Prince Antoni Wilhelm Radziwiłł (m. 1857; died 1904)
- Issue: Prince Jerzy Fryderyk Radziwiłł; Princess Elżbieta Matylda Radziwiłł; Princess Helena Augusta Radziwiłł; Prince Stanisław Wilhelm Radziwiłł
Names
- Marie Dorothée Élisabeth de Castellane
- House: Castellane
- Father: Henri de Castellane
- Mother: Pauline de Talleyrand-Périgord

Princess Marie Radziwill (born Marie Dorothée Élisabeth de Castellane; 19 February 1840 – 10 July 1915) was a French memoarist and noblewoman, a member of the house of Castellane. The famous dandy Boni de Castellane was her nephew.

== Early life ==
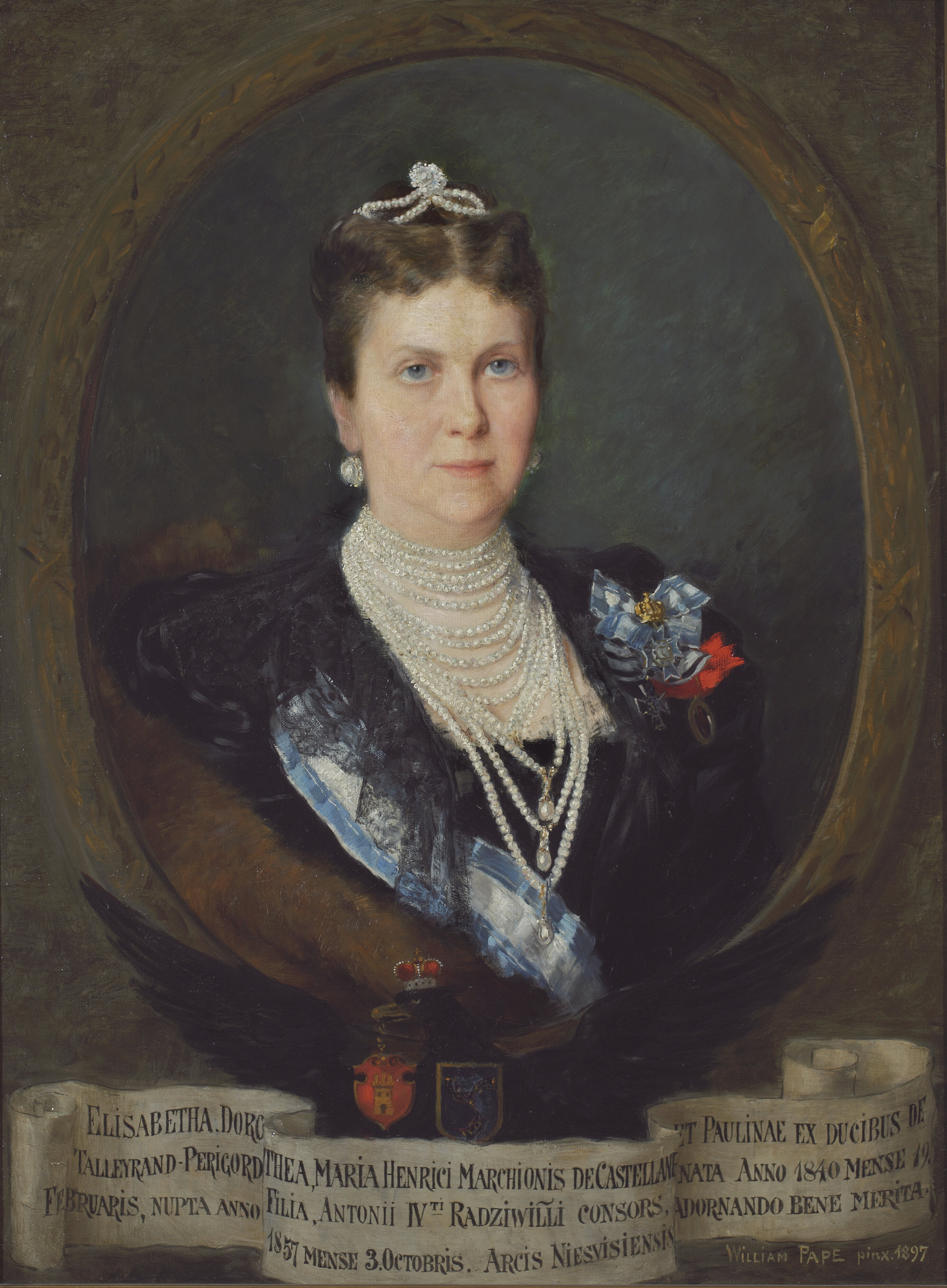
Portrait of Princess Marie Radziwill, by William Pape, 1897

Marie was born on 19 February 1840 at the Château de Rochecotte. She was the daughter of French aristocrats Henri de Castellane, marquis de Castellane, and Pauline de Talleyrand-Périgord. She had one brother, Antoine de Castellane, who married Madeleine Le Clerc de Juigné and had three children that survived to adulthood, Boniface de Castellane (who married American railroad heiress Anna Gould), Jean de Castellane (who married his cousin Dorothée de Talleyrand-Périgord, the former wife of Prince Charles Egon IV, Prince of Fürstenberg), and Stanislas de Castellane (who married Natalia Terry y Sanchez, sister of architect Emilio Terry).

Her paternal grandparents were Boniface de Castellane, Marshal of France, and Louise Cordélia Eucharis Greffulhe (the sister of French banker and politician Jean-Henry-Louis Greffulhe). Her maternal grandparents were Edmond de Talleyrand-Périgord, the 2nd Duke of Dino, and Princess Dorothea of Courland, the Duchess of Dino.

== Memoir ==
In 1906 she published the Souvenirs of her grandmother, the duchesse de Dino and, in 1909, a Chronique de 1831 à 1862, also based on the duchess's papers. Her own memoirs were published in 1931 as Souvenirs de la princesse Radziwill (née Castellane) 1840–1873. Une française à la cour de prusse ("Memoirs of Princess Radziwill, née Castellane, 1840–1873: A Frenchwoman at the Court of Prussia").

== Personal life ==
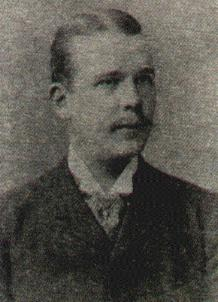
Marie's eldest son, Prince Jerzy

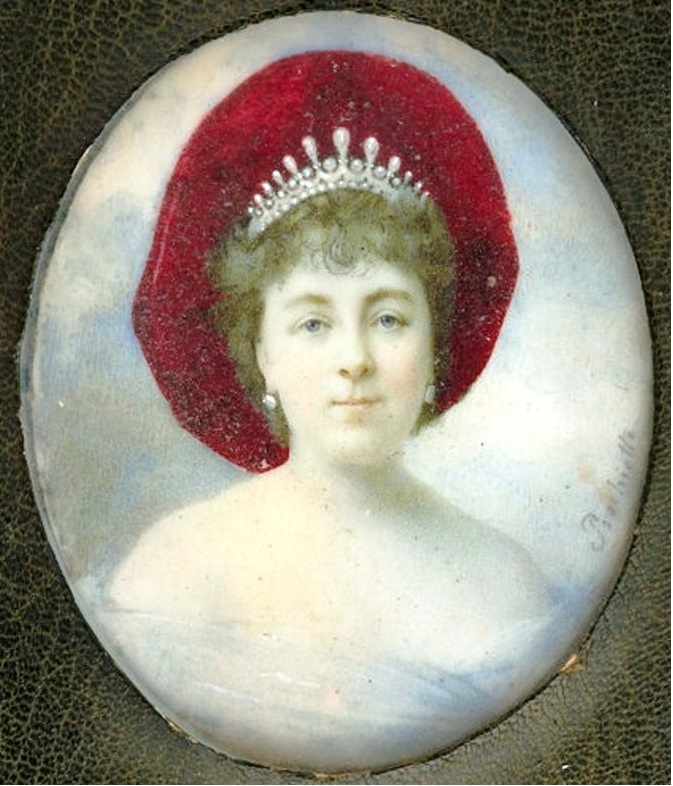
Prince Jerzy's wife, Maria Róża Branicka

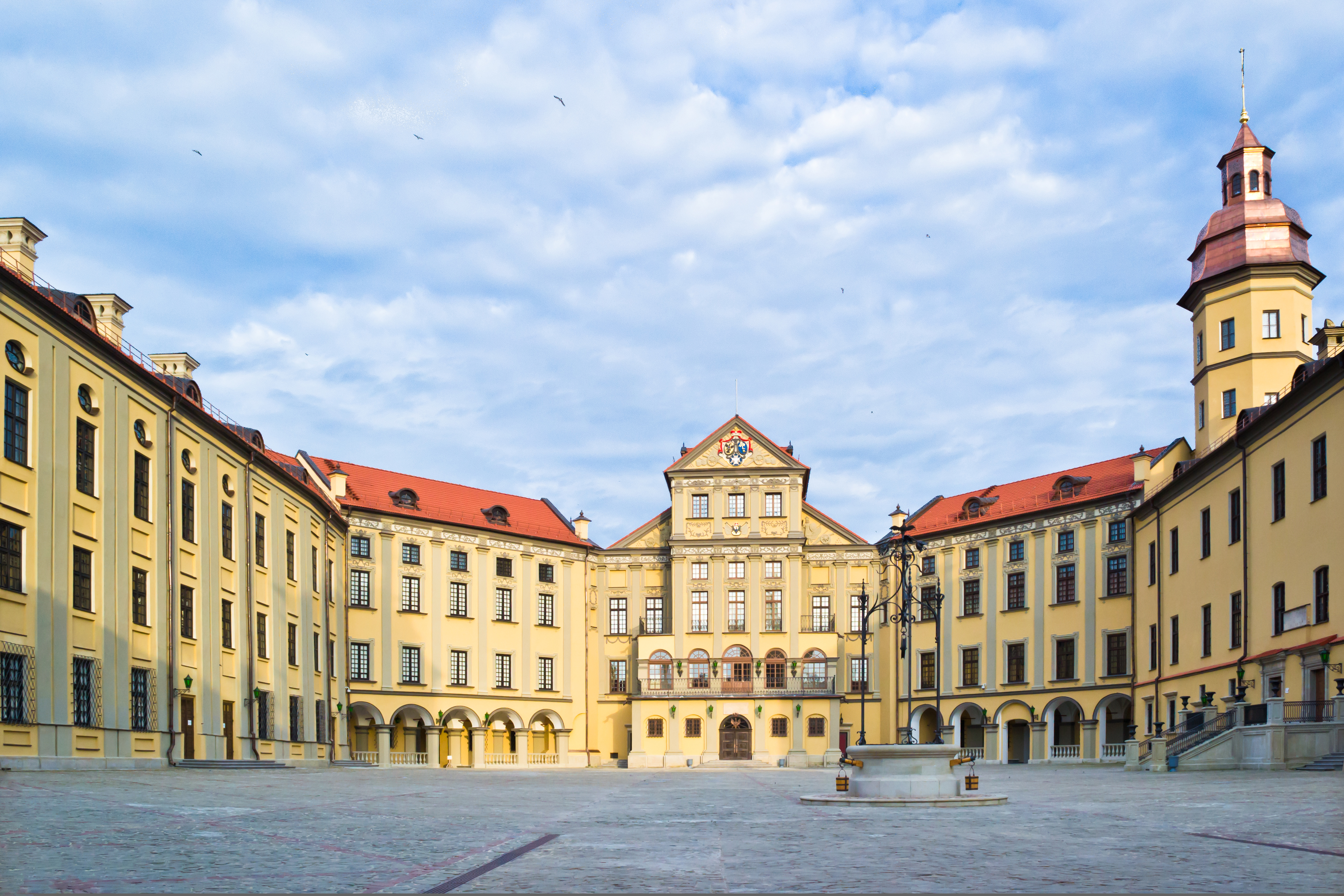
Radziwill Castle is a residential castle of the Radziwiłł family in Nyasvizh (Nesvizh), Belarus

On 3 October 1857, Marie married Prince Antoni Wilhelm Radziwiłł (1833–1904), son of Prince Wilhelm Paweł Radziwiłł and Countess Mathilde of Clary und Aldringen, at Sagan. Prince Radziwiłł, a descendant of the powerful magnate family of Radziwiłł, who owned large estates in Silesia and Posen, as well as Russia, was a member of the Prussian House of Lords and general à la suite of William I, German Emperor. (Note: Prince Antoni Wilhelm Radziwiłł was related to the Prussian royal family through King Frederick William I, whose granddaughter Princess Louise was married to Antoni's grandfather Antoni Henryk, Governor of Posen.) Together, Antoni and Marie had four children:

- Prince Jerzy Fryderyk Radziwiłł (1860–1914), who married Maria Róża Branicka (1863–1941), daughter of Władysław Michał Branicki, owner of a large estate in Biała Cerkiew.
- Princess Elżbieta Matylda Radziwiłł (1861–1950), who married Count Roman Potocki, a son of Count Alfred Józef Potocki, Minister-President of Austria, and Princes Maria Klementyna Sanguszko.
- Princess Helena Augusta Radziwiłł (1874–1958), who married Count Józef Mikołaj Potocki, another son of Count Alfred Józef Potocki.
- Prince Stanisław Wilhelm Radziwiłł (1880–1920), who married Princess Dolores Radziwiłł, a daughter of Prince Dominik Maria Radziwiłł and sister of Prince Hieronim Mikołaj Radziwiłł (who married Archduchess Renata of Austria).

Prince Radziwiłł died in Berlin in 1904. Marie died at the Kleinitz Palace in Lower Silesia in July 1915.

=== Radziwill Castle ===
She spent a large part of her life in Berlin, where (according to Abel Hermant) she was "the Apis bull in person and the queen of Berlin". From 1881 to 1886, she took on the restoration of the Radziwill castle at Nieswiez (Nesvizh, Belarus), allowing her to save its archives and library, add a terrace flanked by Neo Gothic tourelles and redesign the park in the English style (1878–1911).
