= Jean de Castellane =

French politician

Count Jean de Castellane
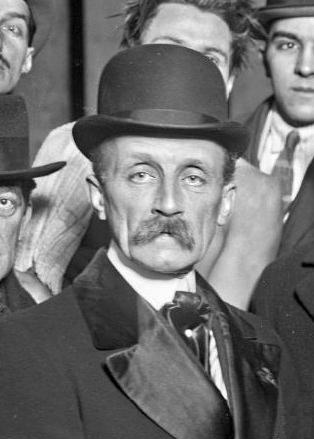
- Jean de Castellane
- Born: 24 April 1868; Paris, France
- Died: 13 September 1965 (aged 97); Paris, France
- Noble family: Castellane
- Spouse: Dorothée de Talleyrand-Périgord (m. 1898; died 1948)
- Father: Antoine de Castellane
- Mother: Madeleine Le Clerc de Juigné

Count Jean Marie Henri Marc Arnoult de Castellane (24 April 1868 – 13 September 1965) was a French politician and member of the house of Castellane. In 1898 he married Dorothée de Talleyrand-Périgord.

== Early life ==
He was born in Paris on 24 April 1868. He was the second son of Antoine de Castellane and Madeleine Le Clerc de Juigné. Among his three siblings were Boniface (who married American railroad heiress Anna Gould, the daughter of Jay Gould), and Stanislas de Castellane ( who married Natalia Terry y Sanchez, sister of architect Emilio Terry).

His paternal grandparents were Henri de Castellane, deputy for Cantal, and the former Pauline de Talleyrand-Périgord. His aunt, Marie de Castellane, was married to Prince Antoine Radziwiłł, a grandson of Prince Antoni Radziwiłł and Princess Louise of Prussia.

== Career ==
He initially served as a cavalry officer but left the army in 1902 to stand in the legislative elections in Cantal. He was elected, but disqualified for bribery and beaten in the by-election that followed. He was a municipal counsellor in Paris from 1919 to 1944 and was vice-president of the municipal council in 1928, and then president from 1930 to 1931. He was also general counsellor for Seine.

He also served as president of the French Swimming Federation. He served as a referee in the 1924 Summer Olympics in Paris.

== Personal life ==
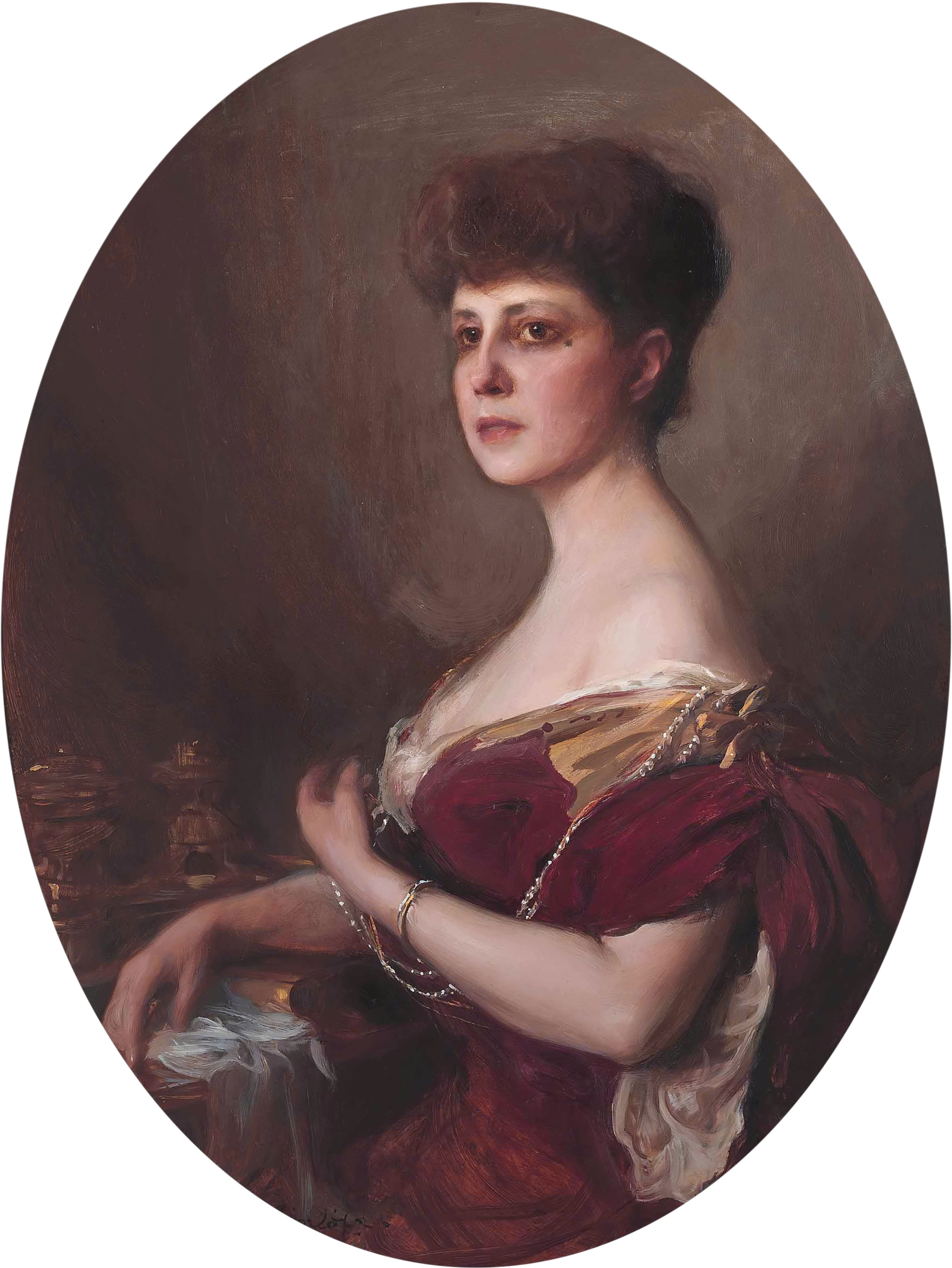
Portrait of his wife, Dorothée, by Philip de László, 1905

In 1898, he married his cousin, Dorothée de Talleyrand-Périgord (1862–1948). The widow of Charles Egon IV, Prince of Fürstenberg, she was the youngest daughter of Louis de Talleyrand-Périgord, Duke of Valençay, of Talleyrand, and of Dino, and the Countess Hatzfeldt (widow of Maximilian von Hatzfeldt, née Rachel Elisabeth Pauline de Castellane).

He died in Paris on 13 September 1965.
