= Antoine de Castellane =

French aristocrat

- Marquis de Castellane
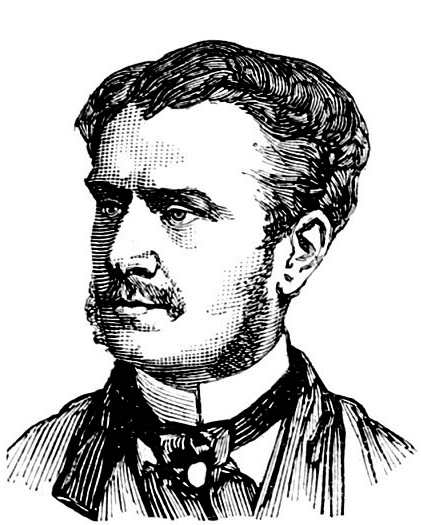
- Castellane, Antoine de (L'Illustration, 1876-04-01)
- Born: Boniface Antoine de Castellane; 12 May 1844; Paris, France
- Died: 10 December 1917 (aged 73); Paris, France
- Noble family: Castellane
- Spouse: Madeleine Le Clerc de Juigné (m. 1866)
- Issue: Boniface de Castellane; Jean de Castellane; Jacques de Castellane; Stanislas de Castellane
- Father: Henri de Castellane
- Mother: Pauline de Talleyrand-Périgord

Marquis Boniface Antoine de Castellane (12 May 1844 – 10 December 1917) was a French aristocrat, most notable as deputy for Cantal and as father of Boni de Castellane.

== Early life ==
Boniface Antoine de Castellane was born on 12 May 1844 in Paris. He was the son of marquis Henri Charles Louis Boniface de Castellane (1814–1847), deputy for Cantal, and his wife Pauline de Talleyrand-Périgord (1820–1890), and was a member of the House of Castellane. His older sister, Marie de Castellane, was married to Prince Antoine Radziwiłł, a grandson of Prince Antoni Radziwiłł and Princess Louise of Prussia.

His paternal grandfather was Boniface de Castellane, marshal de Castellane. Her maternal grandparents were Edmond de Talleyrand-Périgord, the 2nd Duke of Dino and Princess Dorothea of Courland, the Duchess of Dino.

== Career ==
Antoine studied at the minor seminary of La Chapelle-Saint-Mesmin, taught by Mgr Félix Dupanloup, bishop of Orléans.

He served in the Franco-Prussian War under marshal Bazaine and was imprisoned with him in Metz whilst prince Frederick-Charles of Prussia (one of his cousins by marriage) celebrated the establishment of the German Empire at the Château de Rochecotte, which belonged to Boniface's mother.

== Personal life ==
On 3 April 1866, he married Madeleine Le Clerc de Juigné (1847–1934) in Paris. He spent his life in Paris or in his château de Juigné-sur-Sarthe. Together, they had four children:

- Boniface, Marquis de Castellane (1867–1932), who married American railroad heiress Anna Gould, the daughter of Jay Gould, on 14 March 1895 in New York City.
- Jean de Castellane (1868–1965), who married his cousin Dorothée de Talleyrand-Périgord in 1898. Dorothée was previously married to Prince Charles Egon IV, Prince of Fürstenberg.
- Jacques de Castellane (1870–1876), who died young.
- Stanislas de Castellane (1875–1959), who married Natalia Terry y Sanchez, sister of architect Emilio Terry, in 1901.

Castellane died in Paris on 10 December 1917.

== Sources ==
- (in French) "Antoine de Castellane", in Adolphe Robert and Gaston Cougny, Dictionnaire des parlementaires français (1789–1891), Bourloton, Paris, 1889 Edition details Wikisource
