= House of Castellane =

French noble house

- Current region: Provence
- Connected families: Talleyrand-Périgord; Noailles; Gould
- Estates: Château de Rochecotte; Nesvizh Castle

The House of Castellane is a very ancient French noble house originating in Provence and descended from Thibault, count of Arles in the 9th century.

== History ==
Boniface, 1st sovereign baron de Castellane, lived in the 11th century. The sovereign barons de Castellane ruled over a small state bordering the Haute-Provence until the beginning of the 13th century, rendering homage to their overlord the count of Provence.

Even after this they retained de jure sovereignty: "

"Even after having been forced to pay homage to the Counts of Provence, these powerful feudal lords retained the fullness of the authority they exercised over their vassals."

According to Lumens (Histoire de Castellane, published by J.-B. Shares...[t]he town, the castle and the rock of Castellane and declared him sovereign after the example of his elders;

In 1993, king Juan Carlos I rehabilitated the title of Duke of Almazán de Saint Priest on a descendant of the first duke, Louis Provence Boniface de Castellane (1912–1996), who became the 2nd Duke de Almazán de Saint Priest, with his daughter Béatrice Marguerite Marie-Thérèse de Castellane (b. 1944) following him as 3rd Duchess de Almazán de Saint Priest.

== Family tree ==
- Boniface Louis André de Castellane (1758–1837) ∞ (1) Adélaïde Louise Guyonne de Rohan-Chabot (1761–1805) ∞ (2) Alexandrine Charlotte de Rohan-Chabot (1763–1839)
  - Esprit Victor Elisabeth Boniface de Castellane (1788–1862), maréchal de France ∞ (1813) Louise Cordélia Eucharis Greffulhe (1796–1847)
    - Henri de Castellane (1814–1847) ∞ (1839) Joséphine Pauline de Talleyrand-Périgord (1820–1890)
      - Marie Dorothée Élisabeth de Castellane (1840–1915) ∞ (1857) Prince Antoine Radziwill (1833–1904)
      - Antoine de Castellane (1844–1917) ∞ (1866) Anne Marie Le Clerc de Juigné (1847–1934)
        - Boniface de Castellane (1867-1932) ∞ (1895) Anna Gould (1875–1961)
          - Boniface de Castellane (1897-1946) ∞ Yvonne Patenôtre
            - Raymonde de Castellane (1921–2006) ∞ Robert Bertin
            - Pauline de Castellane (born 1923) ∞ Charles Jehannot d'Huriel de Bartillat (1910–1977), had issue
            - Elisabeth de Castellane (1928–1991) ∞ Jean de Caumont La Force (1920–1986)
          - Georges de Castellane (1897–1944) ∞ Florinda Fernández Anchorena (born 1901)
            - Diane de Castellane ∞ Philippe de Noailles, duc de Mouchy
          - Jay de Castellane (1902–1956)
        - Jean de Castellane (1868–1965) ∞ (1898) Dorothée de Talleyrand-Périgord (1862–1948)
        - Stanislas de Castellane (1876–1959) ∞ (1901) Natalia Terry y Sanchez (1877-1962) (sister of Emilio Terry)
          - Henri de Castellane (1903–1937)
          - François de Castellane (1908–1988)
    - Sophie de Castellane (1818–1904) ∞ (1) (1836) Érasme Henri de Contades, Marquis de Contades (1814–1858) ∞ (2) (1859) Victor de Beaulaincourt, Comte de Beaulaincourt de Marles (1820–1860)
    - Rachel Elisabeth Pauline de Castellane (1823–1895) ∞ (1) (1844) Maximilien von Hatzfeld (1813–1859) ∞ (2) (1861) Napoléon Louis de Talleyrand-Périgord, duc de Valençay, 3rd duc de Talleyrand-Périgord (1811–1898)
      - Dorothée ("Dolly") de Talleyrand-Périgord (1862–1948) ∞ (1881) Charles Egon IV, Prince of Fürstenberg (1852–1896) ∞ (1898) Jean de Castellane (1868–1965)
    - Pierre de Castellane (1824–1883)

== See also ==
- House of Talleyrand-Périgord
