= Cocotte (prostitute) =

Historical term for high class prostitutes in France

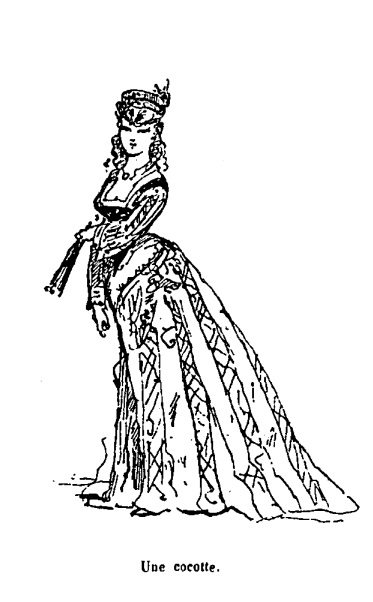
Une cocotte by Bertall from The comedy of our time: studies in pencil and pen, Plon, Paris, vol. 2, 1875.

Cocottes (or coquettes) were high class prostitutes (courtesans) in France during the Second Empire and the Belle Époque. They were also known as demimondaines and grandes horizontales. Cocotte was originally a term of endearment for small children, but was used as a term for elegant prostitutes from the 1860s. The term was also used in Wilhelmine and Weimar Germany from the turn of the 20th century (Kokotte).

== Overview ==
For some women, becoming a cocotte was also a way to achieve financial comfort before settling down in marriage. Some managed their fortune, others died in misery, others finally, like Sarah Bernhardt, who in the beginning was a cocotte, became adulated actresses.

For a rich man of the period, keeping a cocotte was seen as a symbol of his status and virility. Cocottes were elegant, fashionable and extravagant, the papers reported on their clothing, parties and affairs.

Several authors of the 19th century wrote about cocottes, for example Émile Zola with Nana. This novel describes the life and tragic fate of a street-walker who rises to become a cocotte, and whose ways lead to ruin the powerful men she meets.

Famous cocottes include Cora Pearl (1835-1886) (her patrons included Prince Napoleon and the Duke of Morny); Laure Hayman (1851-1932) (Paul Bourget, King of Greece, Prince Karageorgevich and Prince Karl of Fürstenberg). Several mansions of Paris were built for "cocottes", such as that of Esther Lachmann, known as la Païva, on the Champs-Élysées.

== Bibliography ==
- Balducci, Richard (1993). Les Princesses de Paris: L'âge d'or des cocottes (in French). Hors collection (réédition numérique FeniXX). ISBN 9782258127975.
- Chu, Petra ten-Doesschate; Dixon, Laurinda S. (2008). Twenty-first-century Perspectives on Nineteenth-century Art: Essays in Honor of Gabriel P. Weisberg. Associated University Presse. ISBN 9780874130119.
- Feydeau, Ernest (2013). Souvenirs d'une cocodette (in French). Numeriklivres. ISBN 9782897173999.
- Guigon, Catherine (2016). Les cocottes : reines du Paris 1900 (in French). Parigramme. ISBN 9782840969983.
- Pratt, Theodore (1951). Cocotte. Fawcett Publications.
- Rose, David Charles (2016). Oscar Wilde's Elegant Republic: Transformation, Dislocation and Fantasy in fin-de-siècle Paris. Cambridge Scholars Publishing. ISBN 9781443887632.
- Rounding, Virginia (2004). Grandes Horizontales: The Lives and Legends of Four Nineteenth-century Courtesans. Bloomsbury. ISBN 9780747568599.
- Smith, Jill Suzanne (2014). Berlin Coquette: Prostitution and the New German Woman, 1890–1933. Cornell University Press. ISBN 9780801469701.
