= Pauline de Talleyrand-Périgord =

French noblewoman

Joséphine Pauline de Talleyrand-Périgord
- Marquise de Castellane
- Born: 29 December 1820; Paris, France
- Died: 12 October 1890 (aged 69); Château de Rochecotte
- Noble family: Talleyrand-Périgord
- Spouse: Henri de Castellane (m. 1839; died 1847)
- Issue: Marie de Castellane; Antoine de Castellane
- Father: Edmond de Talleyrand-Périgord
- Mother: Princess Dorothea of Courland

Joséphine Pauline de Talleyrand-Périgord, Marquise de Castellane (29 December 1820 – 12 October 1890) was a French noblewoman.

== Early life ==
Joséphine Pauline was born in Paris on 29 December 1820. She was the third legitimate child of the Edmond de Talleyrand-Périgord, the 2nd Duke of Dino and Princess Dorothea of Courland, the Duchess of Dino. She is often thought to have in fact been fathered by Edmund's uncle, Charles-Maurice de Talleyrand-Périgord, prince of Bénévent. She grew up in Talleyrand's hôtel particulier on rue Saint-Florentin, was nicknamed "angel of the house" and "my dear Minette" by him, and held a great affection for him throughout her life.

Her siblings were Louis de Talleyrand-Périgord, 3rd Duke of Talleyrand, Duke of Valençay (father of Boson de Talleyrand-Périgord), Dorothée de Talleyrand-Périgord, who died young, and Alexandre Edmond de Talleyrand-Périgord, who married Valentine de Sainte-Aldegonde (the parents of Maurice de Talleyrand-Périgord).

== Personal life ==
In 1839, Pauline de Talleyrand-Périgord married Henri de Castellane (1814–1847), eldest son of the marshal de Castellane. Together, they were the parents of:

- Marie Dorothée Élisabeth de Castellane (1840–1915), who married Prince Antoni Fryderyk Wilhelm Radziwiłł (1833–1904), a son of Prince Wilhelm Radziwiłł and a grandson of Prince Antoni Radziwiłł and Princess Louise of Prussia.
- Antoine de Castellane, Marquis de Castellane (1844–1917), who married Madeleine Le Clerc de Juigné.

Widowed in 1847, she spent the rest of her life at the château de Rochecotte (Indre-et-Loire), which she was given by her mother. A great friend of Félix Dupanloup, bishop of Orléans, she lived a simple and devout life until her death on 12 October 1890.

=== Descendants ===
Through her daughter, she was the grandmother of Prince Jerzy "Georg" Radziwill (1860–1914), Princess Elisabeth Radziwill (1861–1950), Princess Helena Radziwill (1874–1958), and Prince Stanislas Radziwill (1880–1920).

Through her son Antoine, she was the grandmother of Boni de Castellane who was known as a leading Belle Époque tastemaker and the first husband of American railroad heiress Anna Gould (the daughter of Jay Gould) on 14 March 1895 in New York City. They divorced in 1906, after de Castellane had spent about $10 million of the money given to Anna by her father upon marriage, Anna married his cousin, Hélie de Talleyrand-Périgord, Duc de Sagan, 5th duc de Talleyrand, in 1908. She was also the grandmother of Jean de Castellane (1868–1965) who in 1898 married Dolly de Talleyrand, Jacques (1870–1876), who died young, and Stanislas de Castellane (1875–1959) who married Natalia Terry y Sanchez (sister of architect Emilio Terry) in 1901.
