= Château de Rochecotte =

18th-century château in Indre-et-Loire, France

Coordinates: 47°17′14″N 0°18′25″E

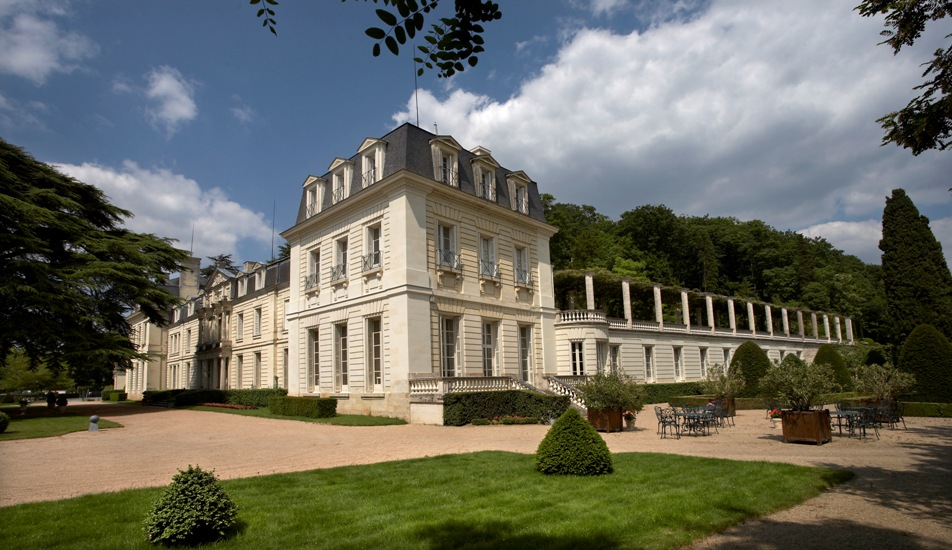
Château de Rochecotte

The Château de Rochecotte is a late 18th-century château located in the French village of Saint-Patrice, near Langeais, in Indre-et-Loire. It is known for its various owners and their many successive rebuilds.

The parent of one of its owners, Boni de Castellane, described it as : "A grand Louis XVI style château - halfway up a hill dominating the Loire valley – lacking neither charm nor originality. It resembles an Italian villa, with superimposed terraces, from which the view extends to the blue and grey horizon, landscapes from old paintings."

In a letter from Dino to de Barante of 5 July 1828, she writes "I have a true passion for Rochecotte; to me, it is the most beautiful view and the most beautiful country in the world; at last this is an air which makes me live lightly and then I arrange, I return, I embellish, I appropriate... I took up country life to the letter."

== Talleyrand and the duchess of Dino ==
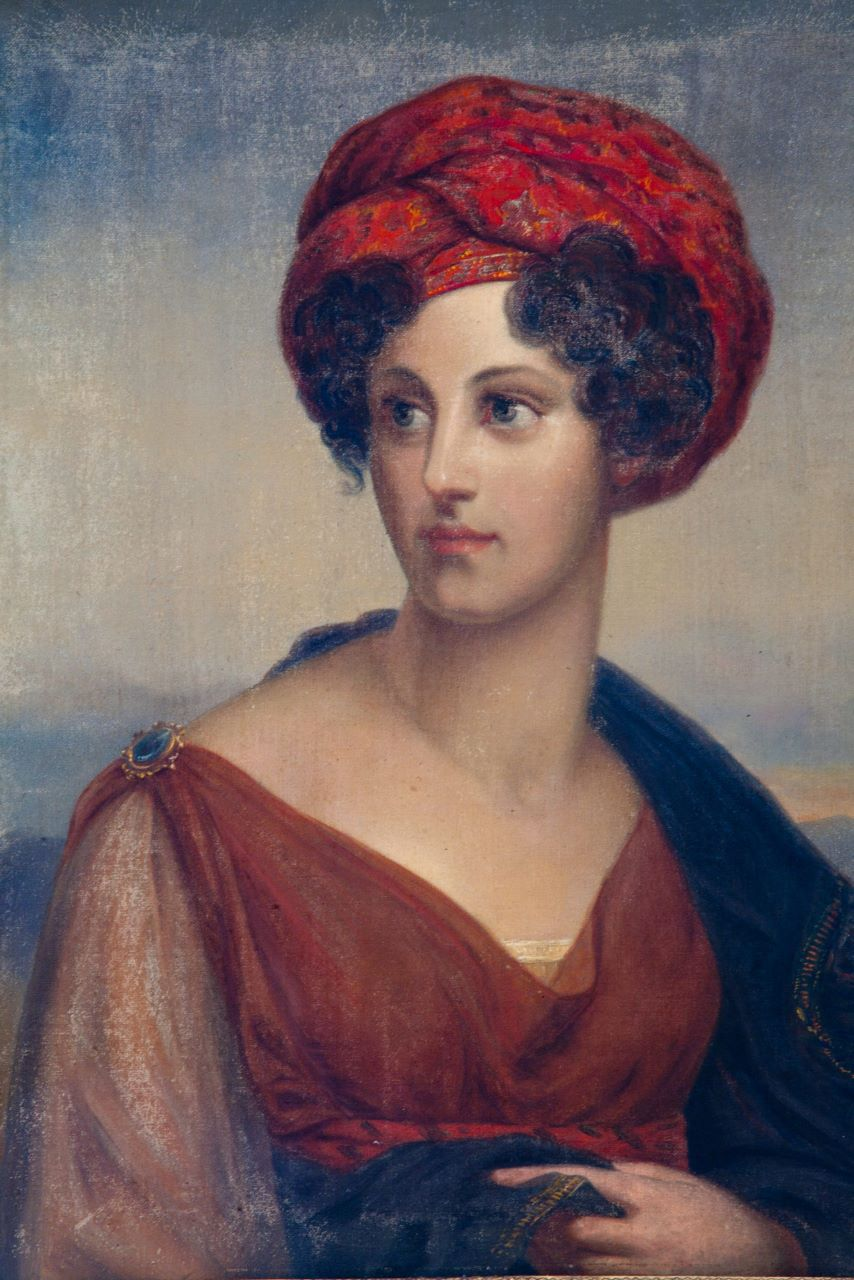
The duchess of Dino in 1816, by François Gérard

Originally, the château belonged to the comte de Rochecotte, who became one of the leaders of the second Chouannerie in Maine and was executed under the French Directory, in the Champ-de-Mars, in Paris.

On 30 April 1828, one of the later owners, the chevalier René de La Selle de Ligné, sold it to Dorothée de Courlande, duchess of Dino, for 400,000 francs, then a considerable sum. According to Jean-Luc Péchinot, "she appreciated its site and its superimposed terraces opening out onto vast horizons (...) she undertook great building works".

== The Castellanes ==
In the grounds of the chateau is a mausoleum to Antonia Terry y Sanchez of Cuba, the mother of Countess Stanislas de Castellane (Natica Terry), sister-in-law of Boni de Castellane and mother of Emilio Terry.

== Bibliography ==
- Françoise de Bernardy, Le Dernier Amour de Talleyrand : la Duchesse de Dino (1793–1862), Perrin, 1965
- Boni de Castellane, Mémoires, Introduction et notes d'Emmanuel de Waresquiel, Perrin, 1986
- Duchesse de Dino, Souvenirs, 1906, edited by Princess Radziwill, née Castellane
- Duchesse de Dino, Chronique de 1831 à 1862, 1909, éd. par la princesse Radziwill, née Castellane
- Éric Mension-Rigau, Boni de Castellane, Perrin, 2008
- Jean Orieux, Talleyrand, ou le Sphinx incompris, Flammarion, 1970
- Emmanuel de Waresquiel, Talleyrand, le Prince immobile, Fayard, 2003

== See also ==
- Castellane family
- Boniface de Castellane (1867-1932)
- Henri de Castellane
- Marie de Castellane
- Talleyrand-Périgord family
- Pauline de Talleyrand-Périgord
- Emilio Terry
- Rouillon
