= Boniface de Castellane (1897-1946) =

French noble

- Marquis de Castellane
- Born: Marie Louis Jean Jay Georges Paul Ernest Boniface de Castellane; January 17, 1897; Paris, Île-de-France, France
- Died: 5 February 1946 (aged 49); Paris, Île-de-France, France
- Noble family: Castellane
- Spouse: Yvonne Patenôtre (m. 1921)
- Issue: Raymonde de Castellane; Pauline de Castellane; Elisabeth de Castellane
- Father: Boni de Castellane
- Mother: Anna Gould

Marie Louis Jean Jay Georges Paul Ernest Boniface, Marquis de Castellane (17 January 1897 – 5 February 1946), was a French nobleman and diplomat.

== Early life ==
He was the eldest son of American railroad heiress Anna Gould and Boni de Castellane, who was known as a leading Belle Époque tastemaker. Among his siblings were Georges de Castellane (who married Florinda Fernández Anchorena, owner of the Fernández Anchorena Palace in Buenos Aires) and Jason "Jay" de Castellane. His parents divorced in 1906 after his father had spent about $10 million of her family's money, and his mother remarried to Boni's cousin Hélie de Talleyrand-Périgord, Duc de Sagan (son of the Boson de Talleyrand-Périgord), with whom she had two more children, Howard de Talleyrand-Périgord (who committed suicide in 1929), and Hélène Violette de Talleyrand-Périgord (who married Count James Robert de Pourtalès and Gaston Palewski).

His paternal grandparents were Antoine de Castellane, a deputy for Cantal, and Madeleine Le Clerc de Juigné. His maternal grandparents were the American railroad magnate and financial speculator, Jay Gould, and Helen Day Miller. His niece, Diane de Castellane, married Philippe de Noailles, Duke of Mouchy.

== Career ==
Upon the death of his father in Paris on 20 October 1932, he succeeded him as the Marquis de Castellane.

A diplomat during World War II, he was serving as the Second Secretary of the Embassy of France, London at the time of France's collapse during the invasion of the Nazis in 1940. During that summer, he was made Chargé d'affaires of the Embassy following the retirement of the other French diplomats. In response to the shelling of French ships at Oran, Algeria by British squadron, Castellane called Viscount Halifax, then Foreign Secretary, on 8 July 1940 requesting "the passports of the French diplomats in England. On July 19 nearly 1,500 French diplomats, other officials and soldiers left London for France, headed by the Marquis."

== Personal life ==
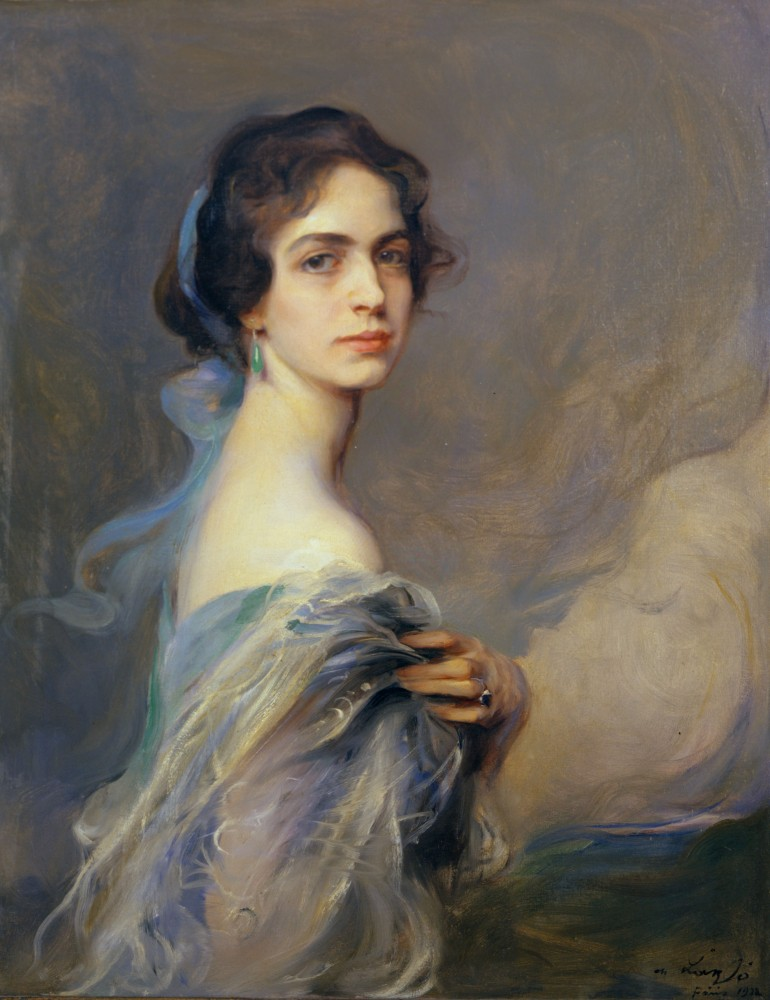
Portrait of his wife, Yvonne Patenôtre, by Philip de László, 1922

On 6 January 1921, while still known as the Count of Castellane, he was married to Yvonne Constance Patenôtre (1896–1981), in Paris with his uncle, Frank Gould, as best man. She was a daughter of Jules Patenôtre (formerly the French Ambassador to the United States) and Eleanor Elverson (the sister of James Elverson Jr. and daughter of publisher James Elverson Sr. by his wife Sallie Duvall, the three of them owners of The Philadelphia Inquirer). Together, they were the parents of three daughters:

- Raymonde de Castellane (1921–2006), who married Robert Bertin in 1952.
- Pauline de Castellane (b. 1923), who married diplomat Charles Jehannot d'Huriel de Bartillat.
- Elisabeth de Castellane (1928–1991), who married Jean Bertrand Jacques Adrien Nompar, Count of Caumont La Force in 1948.

The Marquess died on 5 February 1946. His funeral was held at the Church of Saint-Honoré-d'Eylau.
