= Sacred Squadron =

Sacred Squadron may refer to:

- Sacred Squadron (France), a military unit active during the final stages of Napoleon's retreat from Moscow in 1812
- Sacred Squadron (Greece), a special forces unit formed in 1942
