= Boniface de Castellane =

French military officer (1788–1862)

Boniface de Castellane Comte de Castellane
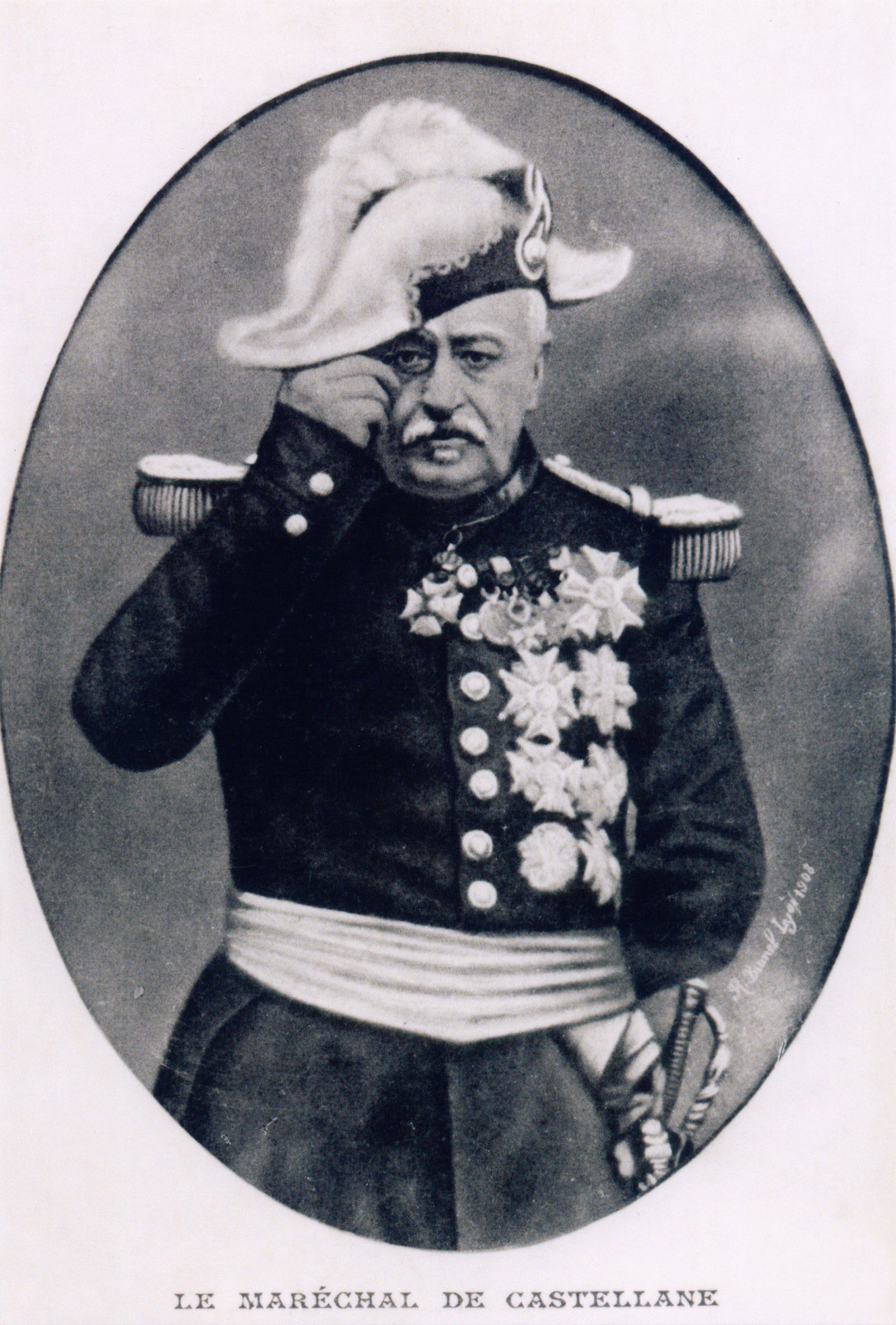
- Boniface, Marshal de Castellane

Personal details
- Born: Esprit Victor Elisabeth Boniface de Castellane; 21 March 1788
- Died: 16 September 1862 (aged 74) Lyon, France
- Spouse: Louise Cordélia Eucharis Greffulhe (m. 1813; died 1847)
- Relations: Marie de Castellane (granddaughter); Antoine de Castellane (grandson); Philippe de Rohan-Chabot (cousin)
- Children: Henri de Castellane
- Parent(s): Boniface Louis André de Castellane; Adélaïde Louise Guyonne de Rohan-Chabot
- Awards: Marshal of France

Esprit Victor Elisabeth Boniface de Castellane, comte de Castellane (21 March 1788 – 16 September 1862), was a French military officer and ultimately a Marshal of France.

== Early life ==
He was a son of Boniface Louis André de Castellane (1758–1837) and Adélaïde Louise Guyonne de Rohan-Chabot (1761–1805), who was also known as Mademoiselle de Jarnac. After his mother's death, his father remarried, in 1810, to Alexandrine Charlotte de Rohan-Chabot (whose husband, Louis Alexandre, Duc de La Rochefoucauld, was killed during the September Massacres of the Reign of Terror). (Note: Alexandrine Charlotte de Rohan-Chabot was also the lover of William Short, the "adoptive son" of Thomas Jefferson, who served as U.S. Ambassador to France, the Netherlands, and Spain. Alexandrine and Short exchanged hundreds of love letters.)

His paternal grandparents were Esprit François Henry, Marquis de Castellane and Louise Charlotte Armande Charron de Ménars. His maternal grandparents were Charles Rosalie de Rohan-Chabot, Lord of Clion, Maroite and Brassac, joint-Lord of the castellanies of Montagrier and Chapdeuil, Maréchal de camp (a son of Guy Auguste de Rohan-Chabot) and the former Guyonne Hyacinthe de Pons Saint-Maurice. His maternal uncle, Major-General Louis Guy Charles Guillaume de Rohan-Chabot married Lady Isabella FitzGerald (the youngest daughter of William FitzGerald, 2nd Duke of Leinster) and were the parents of Philippe de Rohan-Chabot, vicomte de Chabot and comte de Jarnac who served as the French Ambassador to the United Kingdom in 1871.

== Career ==
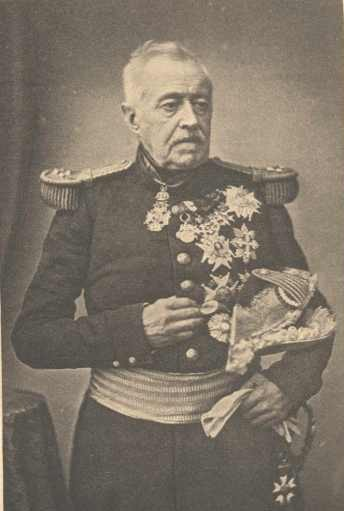
Marshal de Castellane, c. 1860.

Boniface de Castellane entered the French army on the day of the coronation of Napoléon I of France (December 2, 1804) as an enlisted soldier in the 5th Light Infantry Regiment. In February 1806 he was promoted to 2nd lieutenant in the 7th Dragoons. The same month he was transferred to the 24th Dragoons with whom he served in the Kingdom of Naples. In 1808 de Castellane followed general Georges Mouton into Spain as an aide-de-camp. When Napoléon returned to Germany in 1809, de Castellane followed and he fought in that campaign at Abensberg, Eckmühl, Ratisbon, Aspern-Essling and Wagram.

Promoted to captain in 1810, he further served Mouton, by now count of Lobau, as aide-de-camp and he accompanied him into Russia where he served at Vitebsk, Smolensk and Borodino. In October 1812 he was made aide-de-camp of general Narbonne and was present at Krasnoi and the crossing of the Beresina. Promoted to major, he served in the personal protection detail of the emperor during the retreat. De Castellane was promoted to command of the 1st Regiment Garde d'Honneur in June 1813. During the German campaign he fought at Dresden.

=== Restoration and July Monarchy ===
In 1822 de Castellane was given command of a regiment of hussars of the Royal Guard. In 1823 he was serving in Spain but he was recalled in 1827 for his opposition to Ferdinand VII's politics of revenge. In 1824 he was made maréchal de camp (major general). In 1829 he was made an inspector-general of infantry. De Castellane was part of the French army sent to secure Belgium's new found independence. In this campaign he commanded the 1st brigade of the 2nd division. He served in the siege of Antwerp in 1832. In 1833 de Castellane was promoted lieutenant-general and given command of the division of the Pyrénées-Orientales and in 1835 of the 21st military division. Appointed a Peer of France in 1837, de Castellane was sent to Algeria as inspector-general. In 1838 he returned to his old post in the Pyrenees.

=== Revolution, Republic and Second Empire ===
In February 1850, de Castellane was given command of the 42nd military division at Bordeaux. To this was added the 44th and 45th divisions centered at Nantes and Rennes. Later that year, he was sent to the 6th military division at Lyon. In January 1852, he was named a senator and governor of Lyon. In December of that year, he was given the dignity of Marshal of France.

== Personal life ==
In 1813, he married Louise Cordélia Eucharis Greffulhe (1796–1847), the younger sister of French banker and politician Jean-Henry-Louis Greffulhe (father of Henri Greffulhe and Louis-Charles Greffulhe). Together, they were the parents of:

- Henri de Castellane (1814–1847), who married Pauline de Talleyrand-Périgord (1820–1890), the third child of Edmond de Talleyrand-Périgord and Princess Dorothea of Courland, in 1839.
- Sophie de Castellane (1818–1904), who married Érasme Henri de Contades, Marquis de Contades (1814–1858), a descendant of Louis Georges Érasme de Contades in 1836. After his death, she married Victor de Beaulaincourt, Comte de Beaulaincourt de Marles (1820–1860) in 1859.
- Rachel Elisabeth Pauline de Castellane (1823–1895), who married Maximilian Friedrich Karl Franz von Hatzfeldt zu Trachenberg (1813–1859), a son of Franz Ludwig von Hatzfeldt and sister of Sophie von Hatzfeldt, in 1844. After his death, she married Louis de Talleyrand-Périgord, duc de Valençay, 3rd duc de Talleyrand-Périgord (1811–1898), in 1861. Louis, the older brother of Henri's wife Pauline, was the father of Boson de Talleyrand-Périgord from his first marriage to Anne Louise Charlotte de Montmorency.
- Pierre de Castellane (1824–1883), who married Hedwige Sapia and traveled to Algeria to be a soldier under Patrice de MacMahon during the French conquest of Algeria.

Marshal de Castellane died in Lyon on September 16, 1862.

=== Descendants ===
Through his eldest son, he was a grandfather of Marie Dorothée Élisabeth de Castellane (1840–1915), who married Prince Antoni Fryderyk Wilhelm Radziwiłł (a grandson of Prince Antoni Radziwiłł and Princess Louise of Prussia) and Antoine de Castellane, Marquis de Castellane (1844–1917), who married Madeleine Le Clerc de Juigné.

Through his youngest daughter Pauline's first marriage, he was a grandfather of Margarete von Hatzfeldt (1850–1923) (wife of Ambassador Anton Saurma von der Jeltsch), Louise von Hatzfeldt (1852–1909) (wife of Bernhard von Welczeck), Franz Ludwig Hermann Karl von Hatzfeldt, and Hélène Boniface Pauline Luise von Hatzfeldt (wife of Georg von Kanitz, aide de camp to Prince Friedrich Karl of Prussia). Through her second marriage, he was posthumously a grandfather of Marie Dorothée Louise Valençay de Talleyrand-Périgord (1862–1948), who married Karl Egon IV, the Prince of Furstenberg (1852–1896) in 1881. After his death, she married her much older cousin Antoine's son, Jean de Castellane (1868–1965), in 1898.
