= Louis de Talleyrand-Périgord =

Napoléon Louis de Talleyrand-Périgord
- Duke of Valençay, Duke of Talleyrand, Duke of Dino
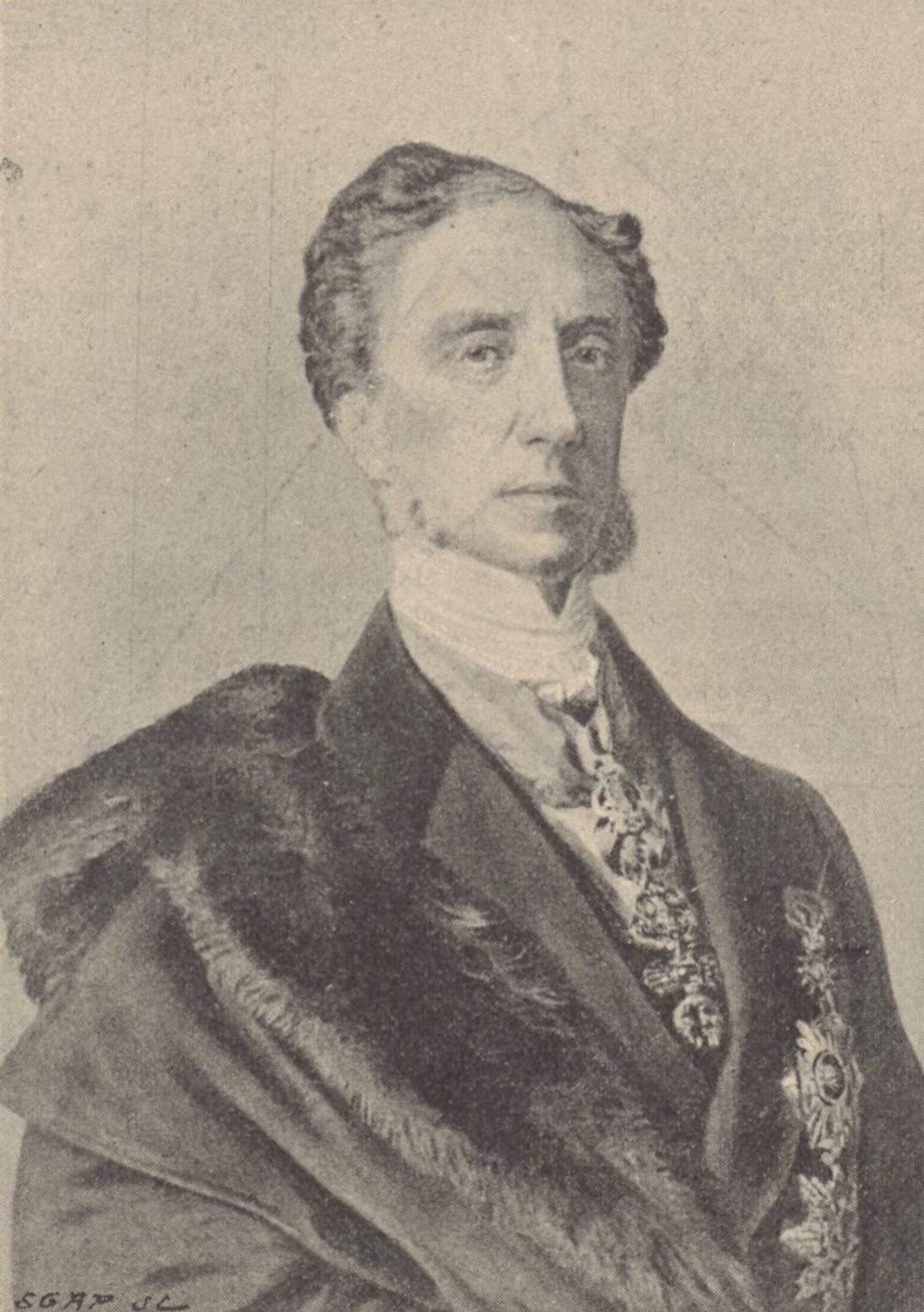
- Born: 12 March 1811; Paris, French Empire
- Died: 21 March 1898 (aged 87); Berlin, Prussia, German Empire
- Spouse: Anne Louise Charlotte de Montmorency (m. 1829; died 1858) Rachel Elisabeth Pauline de Castellane (m. 1861; died 1895)
- Issue: Caroline Valentine de Talleyrand-Périgord; Charles Guillaume Frédéric Boson de Talleyrand-Périgord; Marie Pauline Yolande de Talleyrand-Périgord; Nicolas Raoul Adalbert de Talleyrand-Périgord; Marie Dorothée Louise Valençay de Talleyrand-Périgord
- House: Talleyrand-Périgord
- Father: Edmond de Talleyrand-Périgord
- Mother: Dorothea von Biron

Napoléon-Louis de Talleyrand-Périgord, duc de Valençay, 3rd duc de Talleyrand-Périgord (12 March 1811 – 21 March 1898) was a French aristocrat, soldier and politician.

== Early life ==
He was born at Paris on 12 March 1811, the son of the general Edmond de Talleyrand-Périgord, 2nd Duke of Dino and, later, the 2nd Duke of Talleyrand-Périgord (1787–1872), and of Princess Dorothea of Courland, Duchess of Sagan (1793–1862). His siblings were Dorothée de Talleyrand-Périgord (who died young); Alexandre Edmond de Talleyrand-Périgord (who married Valentine de Sainte-Aldegonde); and Pauline de Talleyrand-Périgord (who married Henri de Castellane).

His paternal grandparents were Archambaud de Talleyrand-Périgord and Madeleine Olivier de Senozan de Viriville. His mother was the illegitimate daughter of Count Alexander Batowski and Dorothea von Medem, though her mother's husband, Peter von Biron, 11th and last Duke of Courland, acknowledged her as his own.

== Career ==
In 1829, he was granted the title Duc de Valençay by Charles X of France.

Like his father, he followed a military career. After leaving the army, he was called to the Chamber of Peers on 19 April 1845, where he voted with the supporters of Louis-Philippe's government.

After the Revolution of 1848 he retired into private life. He was made a knight of the Spanish Order of the Golden Fleece in 1838, and an officer of the Legion of Honour on 30 June 1867, as a member of the jury of the Exposition Universelle. He was further made a knight of the Prussian Order of the Black Eagle on 12 March 1891.

== Personal life ==
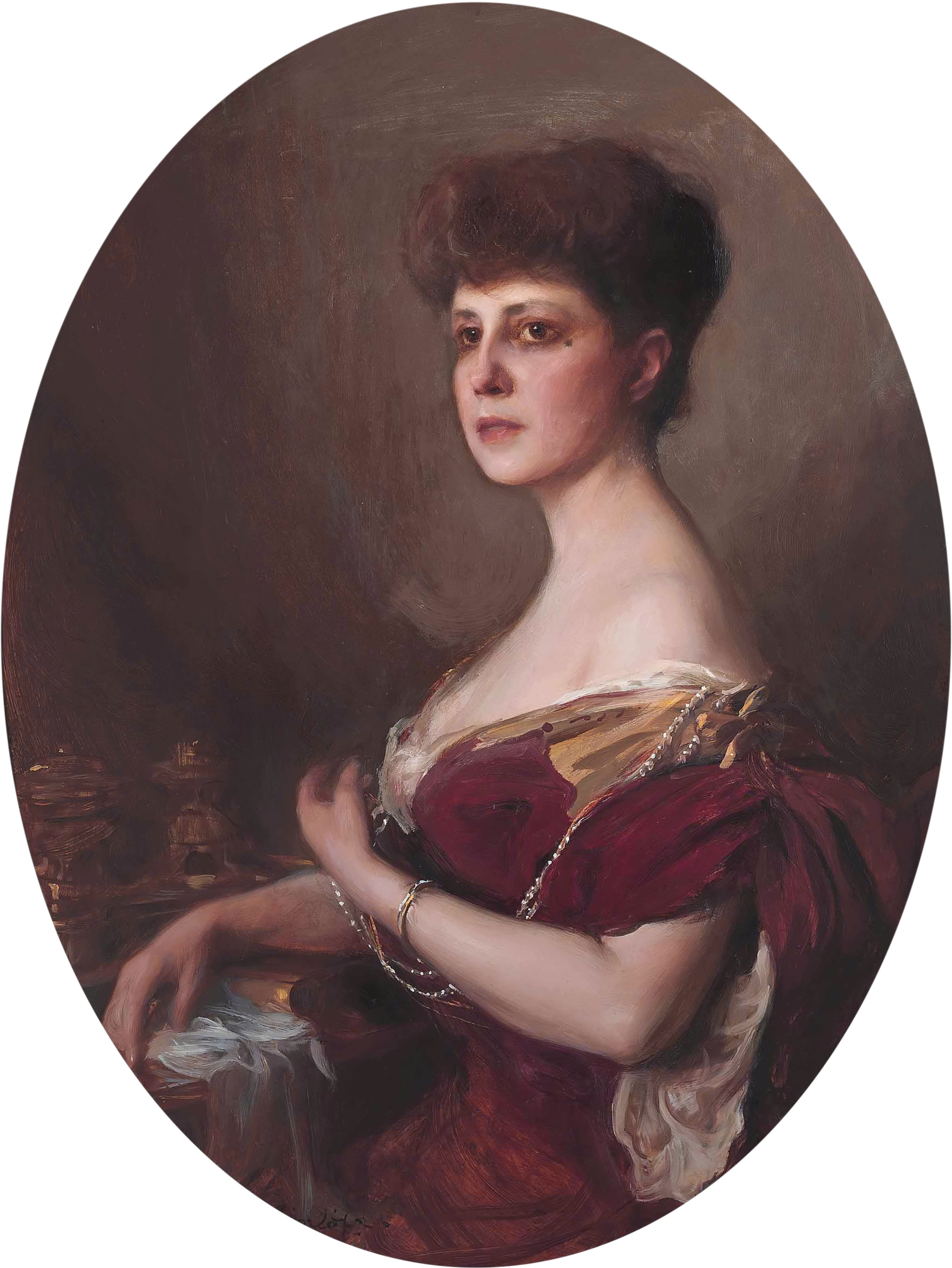
Portrait of his youngest daughter, Dorothée, by Philip de László, 1905

On 26 February 1829 Talleyrand married Anne Louise Charlotte de Montmorency (c. 1810–1858) in Paris. The daughter of Anne Charles François de Montmorency, 5th Duke of Montmorency, and Anne Louise Caroline de Goyon de Matignon, Countess de Gacé, she was sister to Anne Louis Raoul Victor de Montmorency, 6th Duke of Montmorency. Before her death in 1858, whom he had two sons and two daughters:

- Caroline Valentine de Talleyrand-Périgord (1830–1913), who married Viscount Charles Henri d'Etchegoyen in 1852.
- Charles Guillaume Frédéric Boson de Talleyrand-Périgord, 4th Duke of Talleyrand-Périgord (1832-1910), who married Jeanne Seillière, the heiress to the Baron de Seillière, army supply contractor who had enriched himself during the Franco-Prussian War.
- Marie Pauline Yolande de Talleyrand-Périgord (b. 1833)
- Nicolas Raoul Adalbert de Talleyrand-Périgord (1837–1915), who married Ida Marie Carmen Aguado y MacDonnel in 1866; he inherited the dukedom of Montmorency from his maternal uncle, the 6th Duke of Montmorency.

On 4 April 1861, he married Countess Hatzfeldt, the widow of Maximilian von Hatzfeldt, née Rachel Elisabeth Pauline de Castellane (1823–1895). She was the daughter of Marshal Boniface de Castellane and Louise Cordélia Eucharis Greffulhe (sister of French banker and politician Jean-Henry-Louis Greffulhe). Together, they had a daughter:

- Marie Dorothée Louise Valençay de Talleyrand-Périgord (1862–1948), who married Karl Egon IV, the Prince of Furstenberg in 1881. After his death in 1896, she married Jean de Castellane, in 1898.

He died at Berlin on 21 March 1898.

=== Descendants ===
Through his eldest son Boson, he was a grandfather of Marie Pierre Camille Louis Hélie de Talleyrand-Périgord, 4th Duke of Talleyrand (1859-1937), who married American heiress Anna Gould (the former wife of his cousin Boni de Castellane); and Paul Louis Marie Archambault Boson de Talleyrand-Périgord, styled Duke de Valençay, 5th Duke of Talleyrand (1867-1952), who married Helen Stuyvesant Morton, daughter of former U.S. Vice President Levi P. Morton.

Through his youngest son Nicolas Raoul Adalbert, he was a grandfather of Napoléon Louis Eugène Alexandre Anne Emmanuel de Talleyrand-Périgord, 8th Duke of Montmorency (1867–1951), who married three times but died without issue, at which time the dukedom of Montmorency became extinct.

French nobility
Preceded by Edmond de Talleyrand-Périgord	Duke of Talleyrand and Dino; 1872–1898	Succeeded by Charles Frédéric Boson de Talleyrand-Périgord
