= Max von Hatzfeldt =

Prussian aristocrat and diplomat (1813–1859)

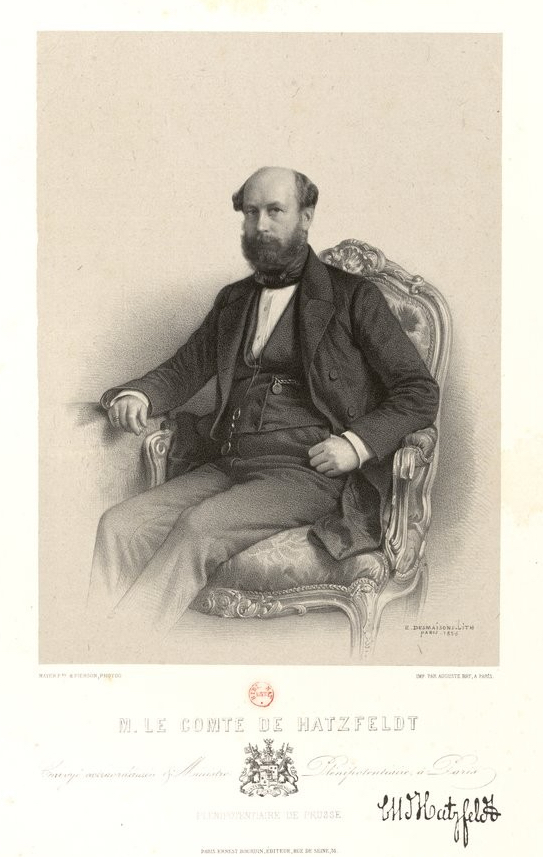
Maximilian von Hatzfeldt-Trachenberg

Count Maximilian Friedrich Karl Franz von Hatzfeldt zu Trachenberg (7 June 1813 – 19 January 1859) was a Prussian aristocrat and diplomat. By birth he was member of an ancient House of Hatzfeld.

== Early life ==
Maximilian was born in Berlin on 7 June 1813. He was the second son and youngest child of the Prussian general, Prince Franz Ludwig von Hatzfeldt-Trachenberg and Countess Friederike Karoline von der Schulenburg-Kehnert (1779–1832), a daughter of the Prussian minister to the General Directorate Count Friedrich Wilhelm von der Schulenburg-Kehnert. His older sister, Countess Luise von Hatzfeldt-Trachenberg was the wife of Prussian General Ludwig Freiherr Roth von Schreckenstein, the Minister of War.

Among his other siblings was older brother Prince Hermann Anton von Hatzfeldt-Trachenberg and sister Countess Sophie von Hatzfeldt-Wildenburg. From his elder brother's second marriage to Countess Marie von Nimptsch, he was uncle to Prince Hermann von Hatzfeldt, who represented the Deutsche Reichspartei in the Reichstag. From his sister's marriage to their distant cousin, Count Edmund von Hatzfeldt-Wildenburg, he was uncle to Paul von Hatzfeldt, who was Ambassador to London and Constantinople, Foreign Secretary, and Head of the Foreign Office.

== Career ==
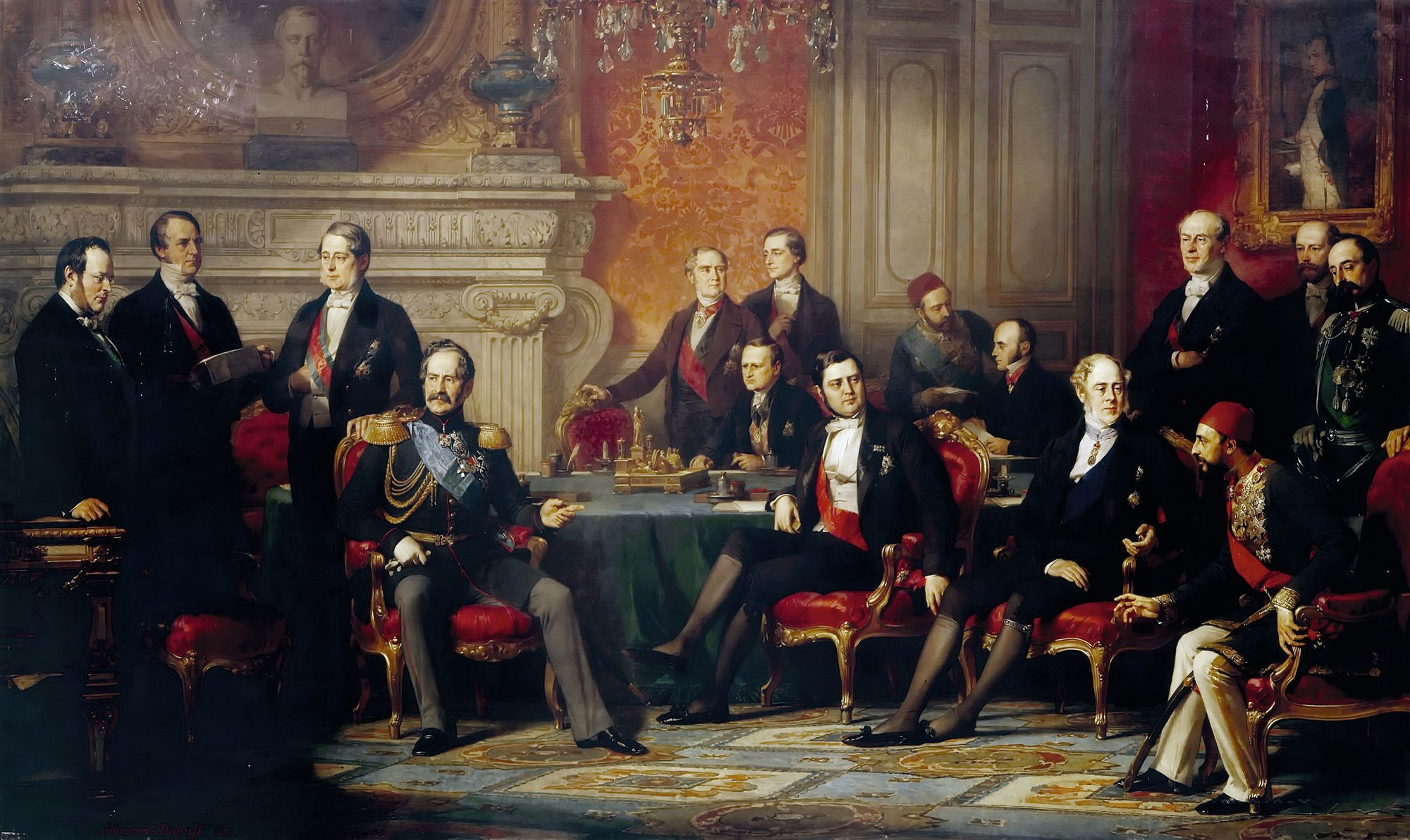
Edouard Louis Dubufe's The Congress of Paris, 1856.

Von Hatzfeldt was secretary to the Prussian legation at Paris and, afterwards, from 1849 to 1859 Minister accredited to the Emperor Napoleon III. In 1856, he was at the Palace of Versailles and was a signatory to the Treaty of Paris which settled the Crimean War between the Russian Empire and an alliance of the Ottoman Empire, the British Empire, the Second French Empire and the Kingdom of Sardinia.

He was awarded the Order of the Red Eagle, the Cross of Honour 1st Class of the Princely House Order of Hohenzollern, Knight First Class of the Order of the Zähringer Lion, Knight Grand Cross of the Order of St. Gregory the Great and Knight First Class of the Royal Order of Francis I. He was also a Grand Officer of the French Legion of Honour and a Knight of the Sovereign Military Order of Malta.

== Personal life ==
Hatzfeldt married on 20 June 1844 in Paris Mademoiselle Rachel Elisabeth Pauline de Castellane (Paris, 6 July 1823 – Berlin, 9 March 1895). Pauline was a daughter of Boniface de Castellane, Marshal of France, and Louise Cordélia Eucharis Greffulhe (sister of French banker and politician Jean-Henry-Louis Greffulhe). Her brother, Henri de Castellane, married Pauline de Talleyrand-Périgord.

Together, they were the parents of six children, three sons and three daughters, including:

- Franz Ludwig Hermann Karl (Paris, 13 February 1845 – 2 April 1884); who died unmarried.
- Hélène Boniface Pauline Luise (Paris, 11 July 1847 – Nice, 12 February 1931); who married Count Georg von Kanitz (1842–1922), aide de camp to Prince Friedrich Karl of Prussia. After divorcing in 1884, she remarried to Baron Arthur von Scholl (1847–1904).
- Melchior (Paris, 18 December 1848 – Münster, 1 January 1880); who married Baroness Mathilde von Gaugreben (1838–1910).
- Margarete (Paris, 23 April 1850 – Berlin, 16 July 1923); who married Baron Anton Saurma von der Jeltsch (1836–1900), Prussian diplomat.
- Louise (Paris, 7 January 1852 – San Remo, 3 March 1909); who married Count Bernhard von Welczeck (1844–1917).
- Bonifacius (Paris, 27 April 1854 – Münster, 31 October 1921); who married Princess Olga Manoukbey (1854–1920).

After his death, his widow remarried to Louis de Talleyrand-Périgord, duc de Valençay, 3rd duc de Talleyrand-Périgord. The duc de Valençay was the older brother of Pauline's brother Henri de Castellane's wife Pauline de Talleyrand-Périgord, and was the father of Boson de Talleyrand-Périgord from his first marriage to Anne Louise Charlotte de Montmorency.

== Ancestry ==
Ancestors of Max von Hatzfeldt

8. Baron Wilhelm Franz von Hatzfeld
4. Count Karl Ferdinand von Hatzfeldt-Wildenburg
9. Baroness Sophie Therese von Loë
2. Prince Franz Ludwig von Hatzfeldt-Trachenberg
10. Baron Karl Ferdinand von Venningen
5. Baroness Maria Anna Elisabeth von Venningen
11. Countess Elisabeth Claudia Reich von Reichenstein
1. Count Maximilian von Hatzfeldt-Trachenberg
12. Baron Friedrich Wilhelm von der Schulenburg
6. Count Friedrich Wilhelm von der Schulenburg-Kehnert
13. Juliane Luise Sophie von Sydow
3. Countess Friederike Karoline von der Schulenburg-Kehnert
14. Christoph Dietrich von Arnstedt
7. Helene Sophie Wilhelmine von Arnstedt
15. Sidonia Helena Magdalena von Stedern
