= Dorothée de Talleyrand-Périgord =

- Princess of Fürstenberg
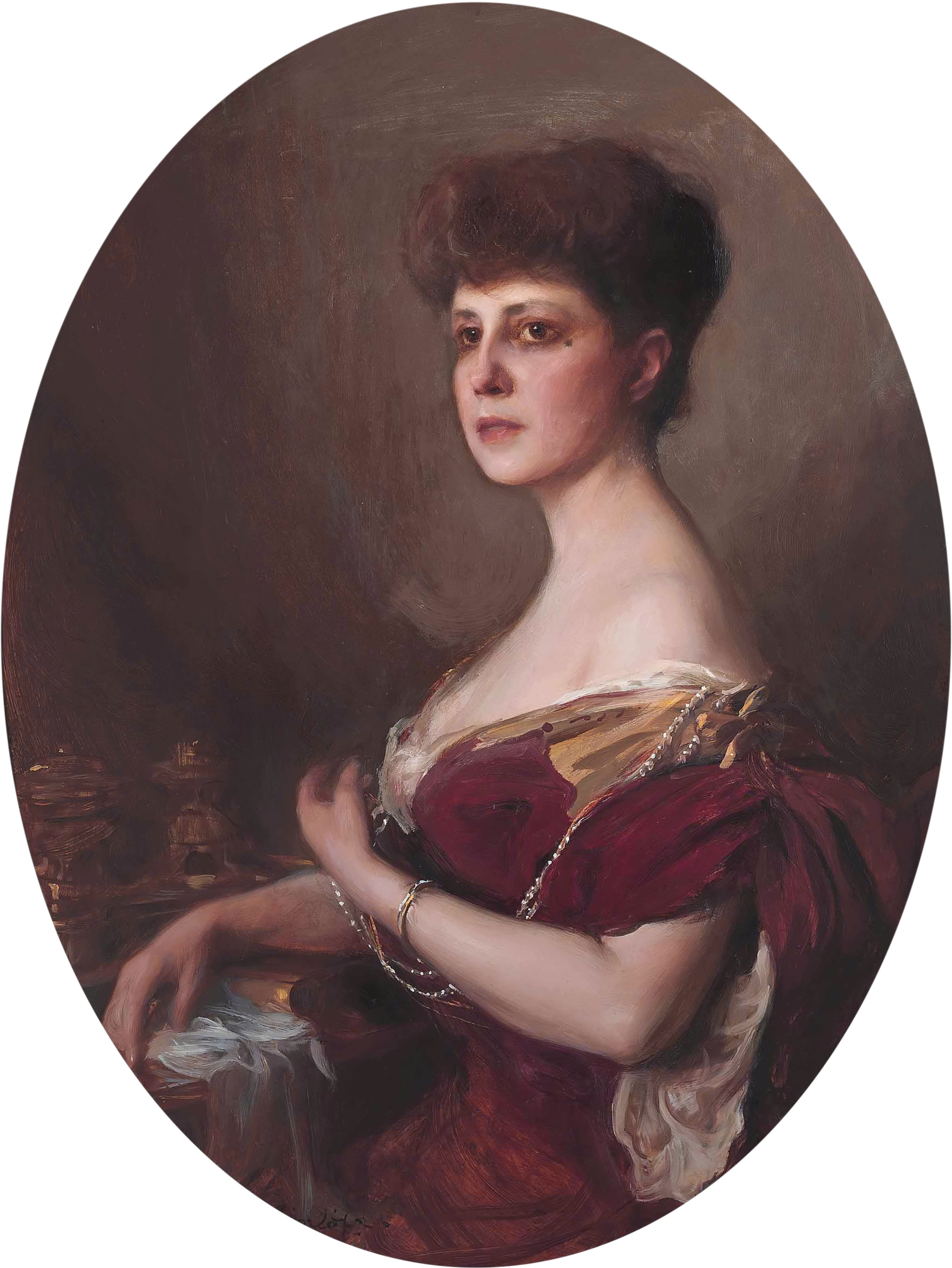
- Dorothée by Philip de László, 1905
- Born: Marie Dorothée Louise de Talleyrand-Périgord; 17 November 1862; Valençay, France
- Died: 17 July 1948 (aged 85); Paris, France
- Spouses: Charles Egon IV, Prince of Fürstenberg (m. 1881; died 1896) Jean de Castellane (m. 1898; died 1948)
- Father: Louis de Talleyrand-Périgord
- Mother: Rachel Élisabeth Pauline de Castellane

Marie Dorothée Louise de Talleyrand-Périgord (17 November 1862 – 17 July 1948) was a French aristocrat most notable for her salons and her role in European high-society in the late 19th and early 20th centuries. Known as "Dolly" to her friends, she inspired artists and writers including Marcel Proust. She was the half-sister of the prince de Sagan, who had dual French and Prussian nationality and sat in the Prussian House of Lords.

== Biography ==
A daughter of Napoléon-Louis de Talleyrand-Périgord (1811–1898), duc de Dino et de Talleyrand and Rachel Élisabeth Pauline de Castellane, she spent her childhood in her father's vast estates in Prussia, where even as a very small child accompanied him on wolf hunts. Her first marriage was to Hereditary Prince Charles Egon IV von und zu Fürstenberg, one-time lover of the courtesan and artist Laure Hayman and son of hereditary prince Charles-Egon III and his wife Princess Elisabeth Reuss zu Greiz. Their marriage lasted 15 years, during which the princess was "one of the main ornaments of the [Prussian] court in Berlin". Her cousin Princess Marie Radziwill (1840–1915) also held a brilliant salon in Berlin. According to Princess Radziwill's nephew Boni de Castellane:

My aunt Radziwill was the Apis bull in person and the queen of Berlin. When my future sister-in-law was princess of Fürstenberg and herself reigned in Berlin, she constantly found her cousin in her way. In court ceremonies, sometimes she had an advantage over her cousin, as a mediatised princess, sometimes not, because prince Radziwill was grand écuyer de l'Empereur.

She also lived in her palace in Donaueschingen. After her first husband's death, she remarried in 1898 to her cousin Count Jean de Castellane, son of Antoine de Castellane. According to George Painter, she inspired Proust to create the character of the young princess Guermantes, who was born a duchess in Bavaria and had a slight German accent. Intelligent and spiritual, she held a prestigious salon at the place des Saussaies in Paris, receiving Wilhelm II. She was nicknamed "Gräfin Jean" (countess Jean) and André Germain said that:

she always had an air of returning from Wotan's home [ie Valhalla].

whilst André de Fouquières stated she:

had an imperious beauty and a royal presence.

She was disliked by her rival, the Elisabeth, Countess Greffulhe. In the inter-war period, her salon was also frequented by several politicians, most notably Georges Leygues.

== Bibliography ==
- (in French) André Germain, Les Clés de Proust, Paris, éditions Sun, 1953
- (in French) George D. Painter, Marcel Proust, Paris, Mercure de France, 1966, 2de édition 1992
