= Sacred Squadron (France) =

Military unit active during Napoleon's retreat from Moscow

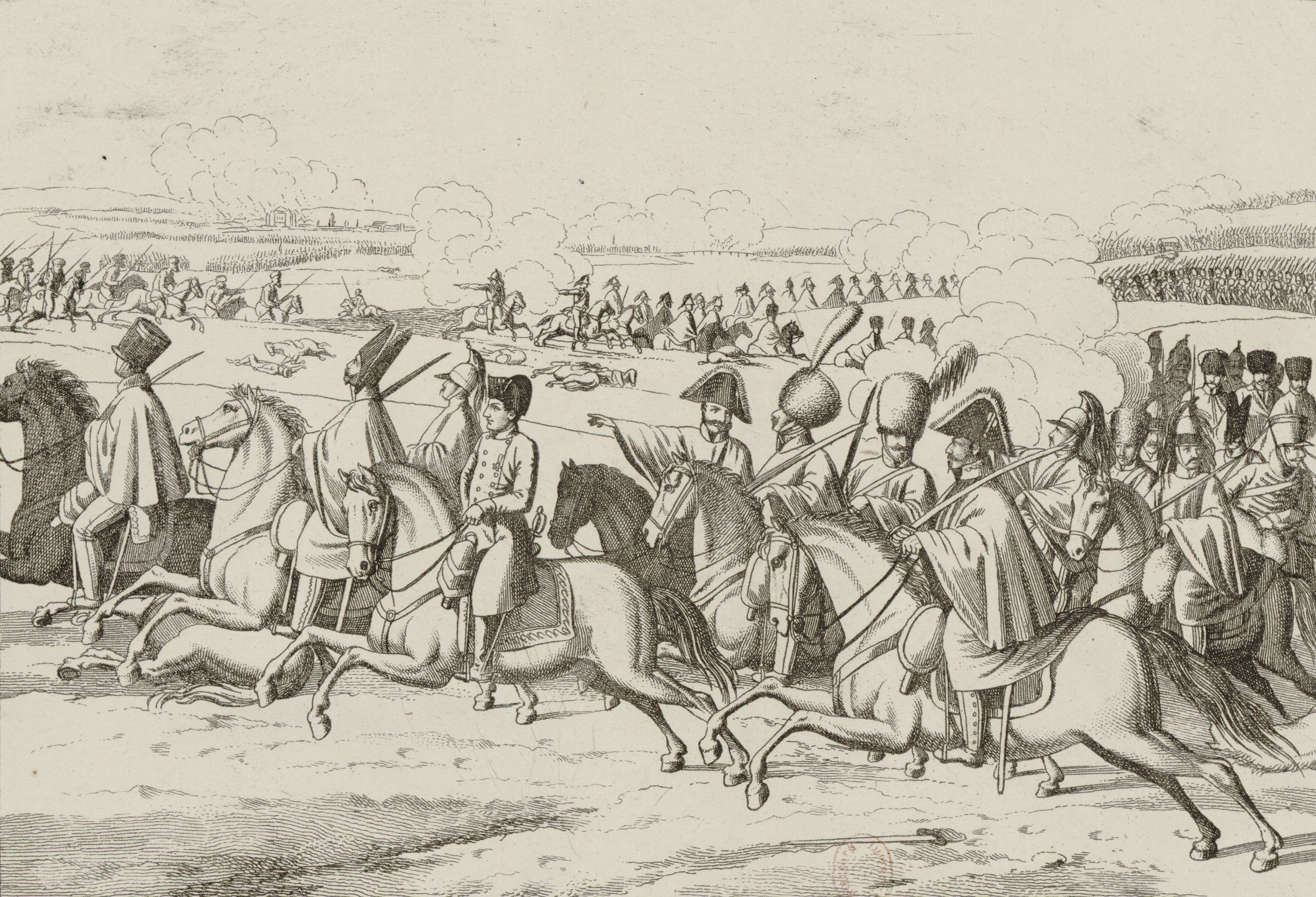
Napoleon escorted by the Sacred Squadron (contemporary print)

The Sacred Squadron (French: L'escadron sacré) was an ad hoc cavalry unit which served briefly in the French Grande Armée during the final stage of the Emperor Napoleon's retreat from Moscow in 1812. It was remarkable in that it consisted—out of military necessity—entirely of officers, with those below the rank of colonel serving as troopers.

The Sacred Squadron was formed on 23 November 1812, by the Bobr River (perhaps at Borisoff, in modern Belarus) to serve as Napoleon's bodyguard. It was disbanded on 10 December 1812, in Kowno (modern Kaunas, Lithuania). It therefore served during the crossing of the Berezina (26-29 November), and continued to exist for a few days after Napoleon's departure for Paris on 5 December.

Its existence is recorded in the 29th Bulletin of the Grande Armée, by which Napoleon hinted to the French people for the first time the scale of the disaster which had befallen the Grande Armée:

Notre cavalerie était tellement démontée que l'on a dû réunir les officiers auxquels il restait un cheval pour en former quatre compagnies de cent cinquante hommes chacune. Les généraux y faisaient les fonctions de capitaine, et les colonels celles de sous-officiers. Cet escadron sacré, commandé par le général Grouchy, et sous les ordres du roi de Naples, ne perdait pas de vue l'Empereur dans tous ses mouvements.

Our cavalry was dismounted to such a degree, that it was necessary to collect the officers who had still a horse remaining, in order to form four companies of 150 men each. The Generals there performed the functions of captains, and the colonels of subalterns [sic]. (Note: The original French text says "sous-officier", which means non-commissioned officer. A "subaltern" was a junior commissioned officer.) This sacred squadron, commanded by General Grouchy, and under the orders of the King of Naples (Murat), did not lose sight of the Emperor in all these movements.

French soldiers had earlier coined the phrase "mentir comme un Bulletin" ("to lie like a Bulletin"). The French populace - and government officials - may have been able to read between the lines for the implications of, if not fully to comprehend, what had happened. The Grande Armée had invaded Russia with 80,000 cavalry.

No written order establishing the unit has been found; it is possible that it was set up orally. No official record of those who served in it has survived; considering the circumstances, it is possible that none was ever made, or that the records of Marshal Berthier (Napoleon's Chief of Staff) were lost during the retreat. Other sources give lower numbers than Napoleon's 600: Chandler says 500.

In addition to its commander Général de division Grouchy, the following are said to have served with the Sacred Squadron:

- Général de division de La Tour-Maubourg
- Général de brigade de La Grange
- Colonel Rambourgt
- Colonel de Fernig
- Lieutenant-colonel de Castellane
- Lieutenant-colonel (?) de Lascours
- Chef d'escadron (?) de Gramont
- Chef d'escadron (?) de Potier
- Capitaine Aimé Benoît Delamalle
- Lieutenant (?) Le Bon Desmottes
- Lieutenant Claude-Xavier-Louis-François Martin
- Lieutenant (?) Saint-Geniès
- Sous-lieutenant Korte
