= Laure Hayman =

French demimonde and sculptor (1851–1940)

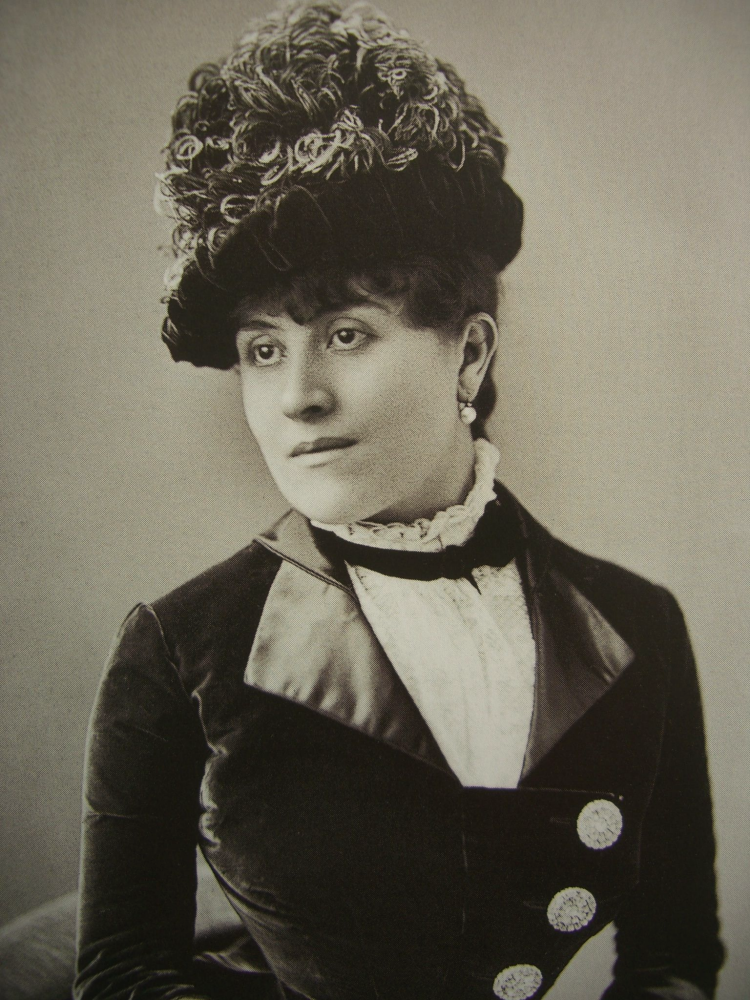
- Born: June 12, 1851; Valparaíso, Chile
- Died: April 22, 1940 (aged 88); Paris
- Burial place: Père-Lachaise Cemetery
- Known for: sculptor, salonnière and demi-mondaine

Laure Hayman (12 June 1851 – 22 April 1940) was a French sculptor, salonnière, and demi-mondaine in the late nineteenth and early twentieth century Paris.

== Early life and family ==
The natural daughter of François Bernard Marie Hayman and Julie Augustine Clairet, Laurence Marie Charlotte Hayman was born in Valparaíso, Chile on 12 June 1851. She was born on the hacienda de la Mariposa, at the foot of the Andes, where her father was an engineer at the time. She had Belgian, French, Creole and English ancestry, and was descended from the painter Francis Hayman (1708–1776), Thomas Gainsborough's teacher. Her father was a merchant, the son of an English consul in Ghent, where he was born in 1824. Her mother was born in Montrouge in 1829. The couple later married in Montrouge in 1858, legitimising their daughter.

In April 1869, Laure Hayman gave birth to a son at her home, 5 rue Treilhard in Paris. He was christened Joseph Edmond Romaric but his father was not named in the record. The following year, the child was officially recognised by Hayman. A week later, Albert Jean Baptiste Edmond Romaric David (d. 1914), lieutenant in the 2nd Regiment of Voltigeurs of the Imperial Guard and brother of Marie-Charles David de Mayrena, self-styled king of the Sedang, also recognised the child and gave him his name.

In September 1871, Hayman's mother Julie died at her home in Paris, 2, rue Maleville. Her husband was said to be "absent without news". The following month, Laure Hayman and her partner, living at the same address, had a second son out of wedlock, named Jean Baptiste Albert Henri. The child died at the age of 13 months, at the home of a pit-sawyer in Nogent-l'Artaud, where he was living.

Joseph Edmond David died at the age of 31, in 1900 in Paris. He was buried two days later in the Père-Lachaise cemetery (division 81).

== Life as a courtesan ==
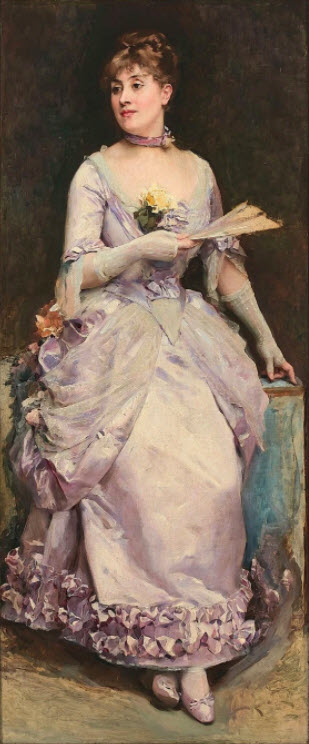
Portrait of Laure Hayman (c. 1880), by Raimundo de Madrazo y Garreta, Fundación María Cristina Masaveu (Madrid).

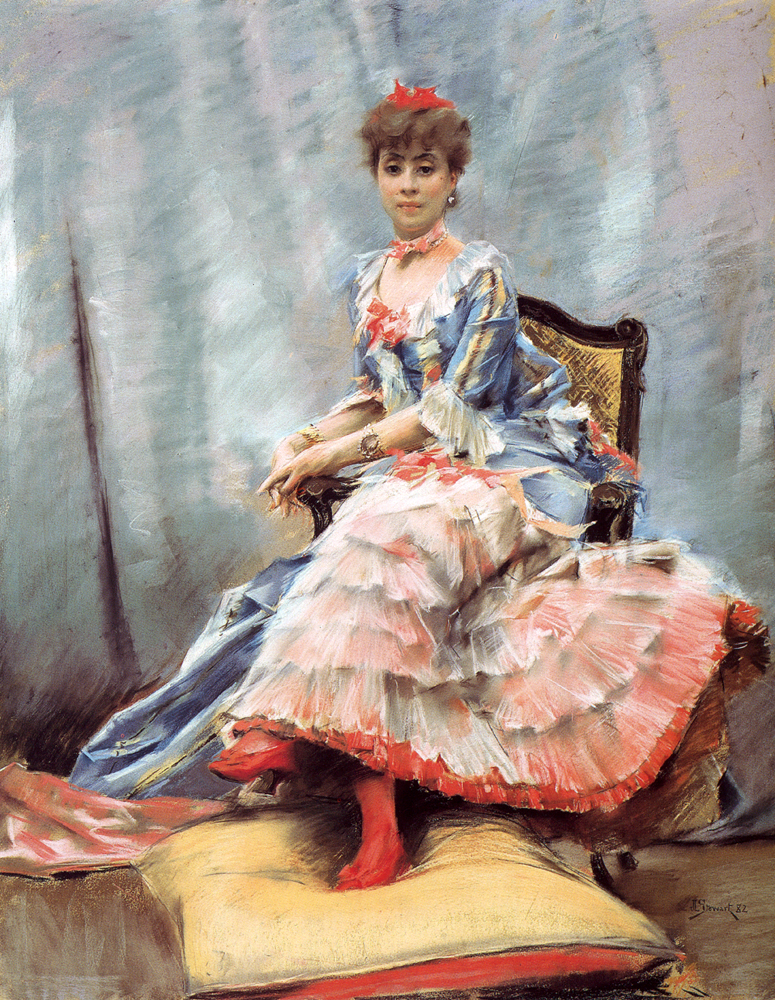
Portrait of Laure Hayman (1882), attributed to Julius Leblanc Stewart, location unknown

Laure Hayman had to earn a living when her father died and was encouraged to become a courtesan, a decision supported by her mother.

Hayman's lovers are said to have included the Duc d'Orléans; Charles de La Rochefoucauld Duc d'Estrées; King George I of Greece; Charles-Egon IV of Fürstenberg; Louis Weil (Marcel Proust's maternal great-uncle) and Adrien Proust, Marcel's father. The only one she was said to have really loved was Prince Alexis Karageorgevich, head of the senior branch of the House of Karađorđević and pretender to the throne of the Kingdom of Serbia. Eugénie Buffet stated that Hayman spent "a good part of her time and leisure getting angry and making up with her most fervent adorer". Hayman lived off the generosity of the financier Raphaël Bischoffsheim at this time. Her acquaintances gave her the nickname of "deniaiseuse des ducs".

She also had a relationship with Mimi Pegère (a Haitian woman nicknamed la Comtesse Noire), with whom she lived.

In 1873, Laure Hayman was recorded in a register kept by Paris Police Prefecture, listing the "dames galantes" of the capital. Under the name Laure Eymann, she is described by the vice squad detectives as:

- She lives at 85, rue du Faubourg-Saint-Honoré, on the 5th floor.
- She is quite a pretty woman, tall, slim and very elegant.
- She has a little boy aged 5.
- Her main protector is Monsieur de Pansey MP.
- She was at the last races at Le Hâvre with him, [actress] Blanche Bertin and the Duke Hamilton.

It is said that she is not without infidelities with M. de Pansey, and that she is even trying at the moment to have intimate relations with the Duke Hamilton, in order to obtain from him a rather large sum of money which she needs."

== Supporting artists at her salon ==
Hayman held a salon at her small Parisian town house at 4, rue La Pérouse, which was considered one of the most brilliant of the time. It was frequented by writers Marcel Proust, Paul Bourget and painter Jacques-Émile Blanche, among others. She later moved to 34, avenue du Président-Wilson.

Hayman met Marcel Proust in 1888 when he was 17. Proust remained a close friend and a regular visitor to her salon. She called him "son petit Saxe psychologique". In the novel À la recherche du temps perdu, the character Odette de Crécy is said to have been inspired by Hayman. It is claimed that she also inspired Proust to write Mademoiselle Sacripant. In 1928, the correspondence between Proust, Laure Hayman and Louisa de Mornand was auctioned at Hôtel Drouot. Proust's last letter to Laure Hayman, "considered to be a unique document provided by the writer on [...] Odette de Crécy", was sold for 4,000 francs. In this letter, Proust firmly denied having drawn inspiration from Hayman to create the character. To coincide with the sale, the collection Lettres et vers à Mesdames Laure Hayman et Louisa de Mornand was published.

Writer Paul Bourget used her as a model in a short story, under the name Gladys Harvey. She is thought to have been his mistress at the time. In October 1888, Laure Hayman gave a copy to Marcel Proust, bound in the silk of one of her petticoats and inscribed with a warning: "Never meet a Gladys Harvey."

She tried to offer works by Gustave Jacquet and Julius LeBlanc Stewart to musée du Louvre. She was also a collector of Meissen porcelain.

== Career as a sculptor ==
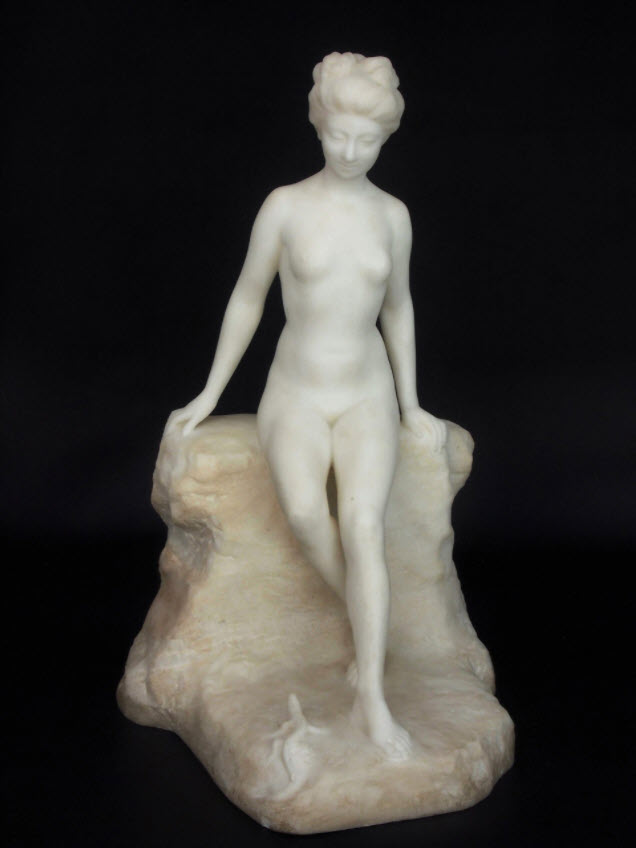
Laure Hayman - Carrara Marble Sculpture 1910, location unknown

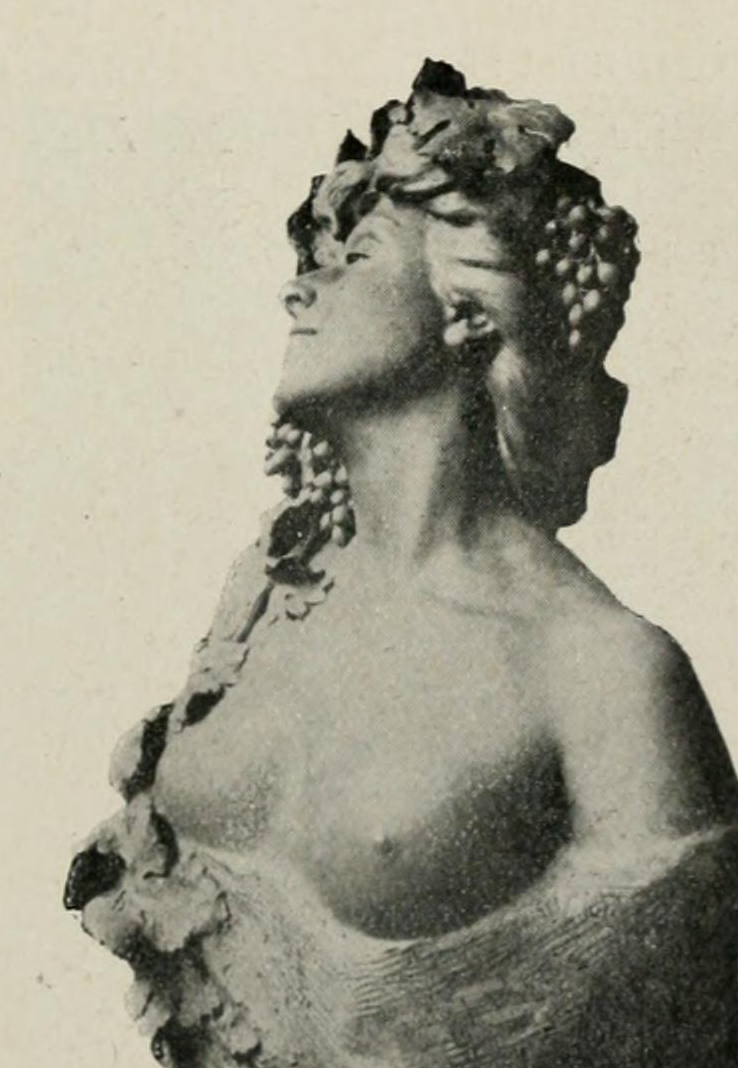
Laurels Breasts and Smiles by Laure Hayman

Laure Hayman began to work as a sculptor, initially with an interest in creating head and shoulder busts.

She later explored subjects with orientalist themes. She exhibited in Paris at the Salon d'Automne in 1905, which brought her some notoriety. She exhibited her work at the gallery run by Georges Petit in Paris from 3 to 15 November 1913.

Many performers of the time, including Isadora Duncan and Gertrude Norman posed for her sculptures. She also modelled wax figures for the Manufacture nationale de Sèvres and worked in collaboration with ceramicist Émile Decœur.

== Later life ==
In 1936, at an auction at the Hôtel Drouot, Laure Hayman sold off part of her estate, which included some of her sculptures, as well as furniture and objets d'art. In 1938, she donated a set of "dresses, skirts, bodices and corsets from the 1890s" to the Musée Carnavalet. In the 1890s, she had been the subject of a file in the Fichier central de la Sûreté nationale, known as the fonds de Moscou.

Laure Hayman died on 22 April 1940, at the age of 88, in her home in Paris, 11, rue Balzac. She was buried three days later at the cimetière du Père-Lachaise (division 81), next to her eldest son.

== Exhibitions ==
- Exposition Laure Hayman, exposition de sculptures, galleries Georges-Petit, Paris, 1913.
- Souvenirs de Laure Hayman, hôtel littéraire Le Swann, Paris, 2020.
- Marcel Proust, un roman parisien, musée Carnavalet, Paris, 2022.
