= Charles Egon IV, Prince of Fürstenberg =

German politician (1852–1896)

Charles Egon IV
- Prince of Fürstenberg

Head of the House of Fürstenberg
- Tenure: 1892–1896
- Predecessor: Charles Egon III
- Successor: Maximilian Egon II
- Born: Charles Egon Maria Frédéric Emile Kaspar Henri Guillaume Kamill Max Louis Victor; 25 August 1852; Krušovice, Austrian Empire
- Died: 27 November 1896 (aged 44); Château de Bruttan, France
- Spouse: Countess Dorothée de Talleyrand-Périgord (m. 1881; died 1896)
- House: Fürstenberg
- Father: Charles Egon III of Fürstenberg
- Mother: Princess Elisabeth Reuss of Greiz

Charles Egon IV, Prince of Fürstenberg (Charles Egon Maria Frédéric Emile Kaspar Henri Guillaume Kamill Max Louis Victor; 25 August 1852 – 27 November 1896) was a German military officer and nobleman who was the head of the House of Fürstenberg from 1892 to 1896.

== Early life ==
He was born in Krušovice, the son of Charles Egon III of Fürstenberg and his wife, Princess Elisabeth Reuss of Greiz, youngest daughter of Heinrich XIX, Prince Reuss of Greiz.

He was taught by private tutors and traveled in his youth, as well as assisting at philosophical and legal conferences at Heidelberg University from 1872 to 1874. He then continued to study at Strasbourg University.

== Career ==
After his studies at Strasbourg University, he entered the Prussian Army as a lieutenant in a hussar regiment at Potsdam, rising to major, then colonel.

He accompanied the Prince of Hatzfeldt-Trachenberg in March 1888 on the latter's trip to Rome to meet Pope Leo XIII. Following his father's death in 1892, he became Prince of Fürstenberg. A member of the Prussian House of Lords, the Württemberg House of Lords and the upper house in Baden, he was elected to the Reichstag on 10 November 1893.

== Personal life ==
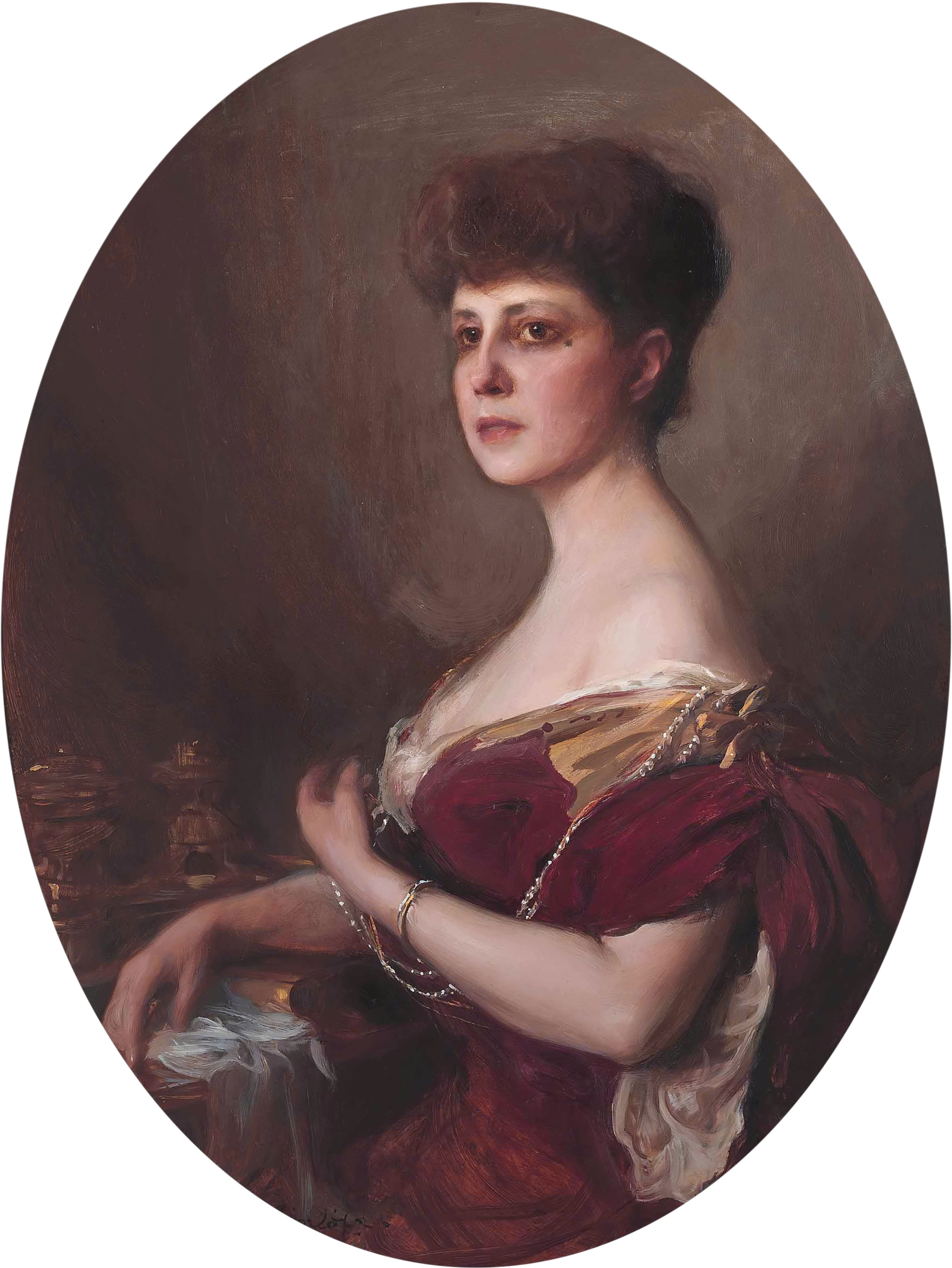
Portrait of his wife, Dorothée, by Philip de László, 1905

Reportedly, he was among the lovers of the courtesan and artist Laure Hayman.

Nevertheless, on 6 July 1881, he married Countess Dorothée "Dolly" de Talleyrand-Périgord (1862–1948), a daughter of duke Napoléon-Louis de Talleyrand-Périgord (son of duke Edmond de Talleyrand-Périgord and princess Dorothée de Courlande) and his wife, Pauline de Castellane (daughter of marshal Boniface de Castellane and his wife, Louise-Cordélia Greffulhe).

The prince died at the Château de Bruttan near Nice on 27 November 1896. His title passed to his cousin, Maximilian Egon II. His widow, Dorothée, remarried to Jean de Castellane.

== Ancestry ==
Ancestors of Charles Egon IV, Prince of Fürstenberg

8. Charles Aloys, Prince of Fürstenberg
4. Charles Egon II, Prince of Fürstenberg
9. Princess Elisabeth of Thurn and Taxis
2. Charles Egon III, Prince of Fürstenberg
10. Charles Frederick, Grand Duke of Baden
5. Princess Amalie of Baden
11. Baroness Caroline Louise Geyer von Geyersberg
1. Charles Egon IV, Prince of Fürstenberg
12. Heinrich XIII, Prince Reuss of Greiz
6. Heinrich XIX, Prince Reuss of Greiz
13. Princess Wilhelmine Louise of Nassau-Weilburg
3. Princess Elisabeth Reuss of Greiz
14. Prince Charles Louis Gaspard de Rohan-Rochefort
7. Princess Gasparine de Rohan-Rochefort
15. Marie Louise Joséphine de Rohan-Guéméné
