= Boni de Castellane =

French nobleman (1867–1932)

- Marquis de Castellane
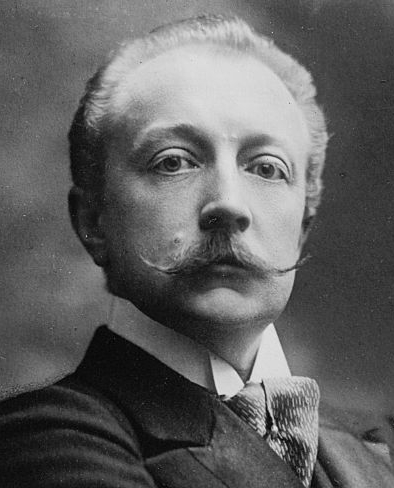
- Born: Marie Ernest Paul Boniface de Castellane, Marquis de Castellane; February 14, 1867; Paris, Île-de-France, France
- Died: October 20, 1932 (aged 65); Paris, Île-de-France, France
- Noble family: Castellane
- Spouse: Anna Gould (m. 1895; div. 1906)
- Issue: Marie-Louise de Castellane; Boniface de Castellane; Georges de Castellane; Jason de Castellane
- Father: Antoine de Castellane
- Mother: Madeleine Le Clerc de Juigné

Marie Ernest Paul Boniface de Castellane, Marquis de Castellane (14 February 1867 – 20 October 1932), known as Boni de Castellane, was a French nobleman and politician. He was known as a leading Belle Époque tastemaker and the first husband of American railroad heiress Anna Gould.

== Early life ==
Comte Boni de Castellane was born in Paris as the eldest son of Antoine, Marquis de Castellane, and his wife Madeleine Le Clerc de Juigné. His brothers were Jean and Stanislas de Castellane. Like his brothers, Boni bore the courtesy title of comte de Castellane, until he inherited his father's title upon the latter's death in 1917.

His paternal grandparents were Henri, Marquis de Castellane, deputy for Cantal, and his wife Pauline de Talleyrand-Périgord. His aunt, Marie de Castellane, was married to Prince Antoine Radziwiłł, a grandson of Prince Antoni Radziwiłł and Princess Louise of Prussia.

== Marriage and children ==
On 4 March 1895, he was married to heiress Anna Gould (1875–1961), the daughter of Jay Gould, the American industrialist and millionaire, in New York City at the home of her brother, George J. Gould. Count Boni, as he was known in America, was "the first Frenchman to marry an American heiress." He was a notable “man about town”, his doings and photograph often appearing in the papers. His dapper, Continental appearance stood out in New York, and was a subject of contemporary comment. Arthur Train, in his 1907 book “True Stories of Crime From the District Attorney’s Office”, reports one instance. A police officer is reporting on the activities of a con man calling himself the ‘Duc de Nevers’:

“Do you know what the feller did? Why, one afternoon when a swell guy and his girl were out in their gas wagon a mounted cop in the park pulls them in and takes them over to the 57th Street Court. Well, just as me friend is taking them into the house along walks this Charley Nevers wid his tall silk hat and pearl handle cane, wid a flower in his buttonhole, and his black coat tails dangling around his heels, just like Boni de Castellane, and says he, 'Officer,' says he, 'may I inquire what for you're apprehending this gentleman and lady?’”.

Together, they had four children:

- Marie-Louise de Castellane (b. 1896)
- Boniface, Marquis de Castellane (1897–1946), who married Yvonne Patenôtre (daughter of Jules Patenôtre and his wife Eleanor Elverson, who was the sister of James Elverson Jr. and daughter of publisher James Elverson Sr. by his wife Sallie Duvall, the three of them owners of The Philadelphia Inquirer)
- Georges de Castellane (1897–1944), who married Florinda Fernández de Anchorena (b. 1901)
- Jason "Jay" de Castellane (1902–1956)

== Divorce and later life ==
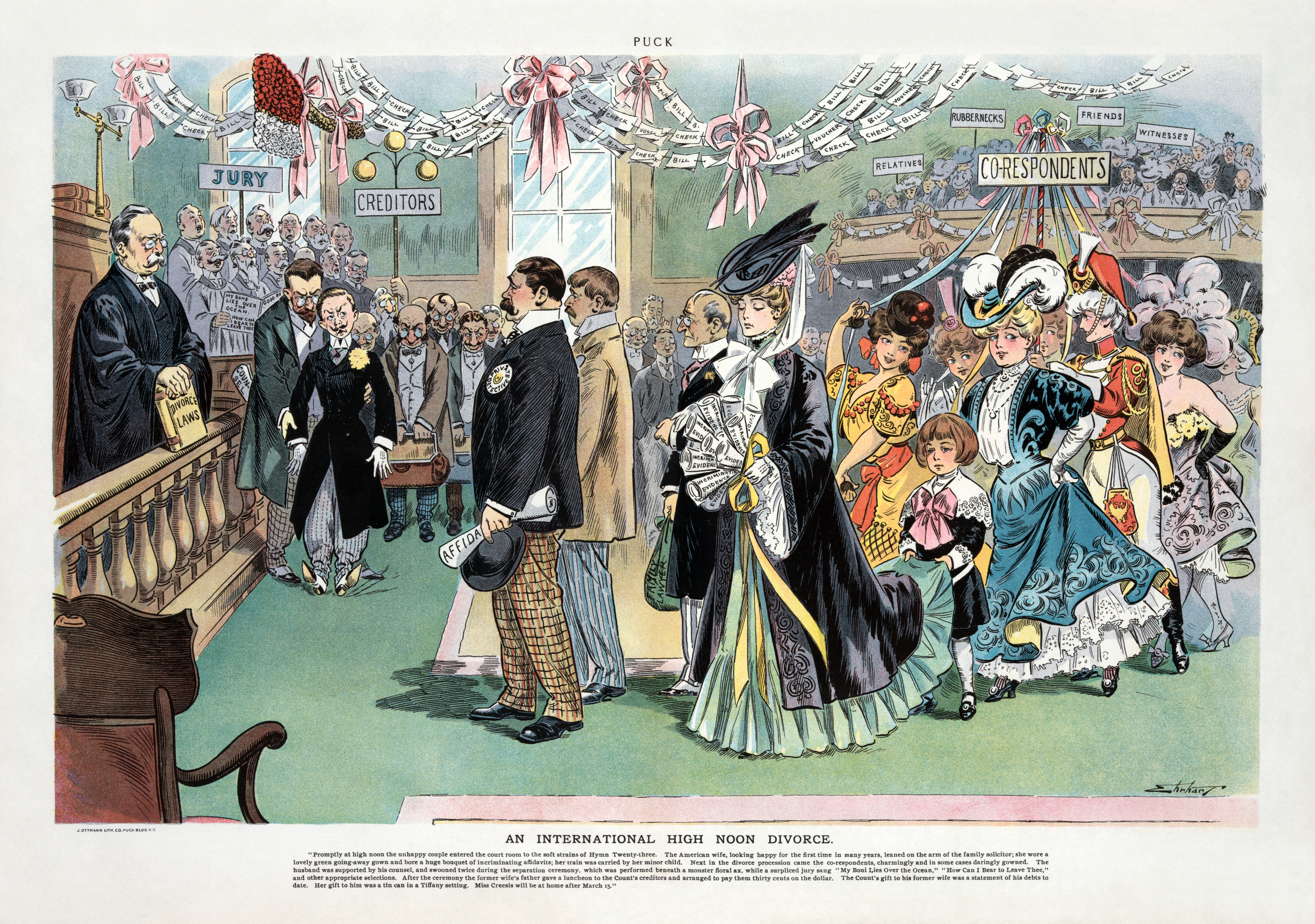
A parody of the circus-like atmosphere of the divorce proceedings of Anna Gould against her husband, Boni de Castellane. Amongst other things, she is shown holding a bouquet made of indictments against her husband.

The count obtained a civil divorce in 1906, after he had spent about $10 million of the money given to Anna by her father upon marriage, much of it being used to lavish expensive gifts upon his various mistresses. In 1908, the countess married his cousin, Hélie de Talleyrand-Périgord, Duke of Sagan, 5th Duke of Talleyrand, and de Castellane then sought an annulment from the Vatican so that he could be free to remarry in the Church. The annulment case was settled in 1924, when the highest Vatican tribunal upheld the validity of the marriage and denied the annulment.

Time magazine wrote on 13 April 1925:

Probably not since Henry VIII tried in vain to get an annulment of his marriage with Catherine of Aragon has a matrimonial case been so long in the courts of the Roman Catholic Church as that on which nine Cardinals have just handed down a final decision. The male in this case is the son of one of France's most historic houses − Le Comte Boni de Castellane. The female is the daughter of a United States stockbroker, the late Jay Gould − the present Anna, Marquise de Talleyrand Périgord, Duchesse de Sagan. On March 14, 1895, Anna became La Comtesse de Castellane by a marriage solemnized in Manhattan by the late Archbishop Corrigan. After three children were born, La Comtesse obtained a civil divorce from Le Comte on grounds of infidelity. In 1908, she married Le Marquis de Talleyrand Périgord, Duc de Sagan. Thereupon, Le Comte asked the Vatican to annul the marriage, apparently that he might be free to marry again, within the Church.

- Trial I. The Roman Rota upheld the marriage in 1911. Le Comte appealed.
- Trial II. Anna refused to be represented at this trial. The marriage was declared void. Anna appealed.
- Trial III. The marriage was declared valid. Le Comte appealed from the Rota to Pope Benedict XV.
- Trial IV. The case was laid before a Commission of the Apostolic Signatura − the supreme tribunal of the Church. Six cardinals composed the commission. They held the marriage valid. Le Comte appealed to Pope Pius XI.
- Trial V. The Commission declared the marriage invalid. Anna appealed to the Pope who, to settle it once and forever, assigned three extra cardinals to the commission.
- Trial VI was before Cardinals De Lai (Italian), Pomphilj (Italian), Van Rossum (Dutch), Sbaretti (Italian), Silj (Italian), Bisleti (Italian), Sincere (Italian), Lega (Italian), Mori (Italian). The marriage was held valid. Formal proclamation will soon be issued.

The Marquis de Castellane died in Paris on 20 October 1932, a week after suffering a paralytic stroke. His funeral, which his former wife did not attend, was held in Paris at the Church of Saint-Philippe-du-Roule and he was buried at St. Patrice.

== Descendants ==
He was the grandfather of Elisabeth de Castellane (1928–1991), who married Jean Bertrand Jacques Adrien Nompar, Comte de Caumont La Force (1920–1986) in Paris on 7 December 1948, and Diane Rose Anne Marie de Castellane y Fernández de Anchorena (b. 1927), who first married Philippe de Noailles, Duc de Mouchy and Prince-Duc de Poix (born in Paris, 17 April 1922) on 14 April 1948. They divorced on 13 March 1974.

== See also ==
- Boniface de Castellane
- House of Castellane
