= Edmond de Talleyrand-Périgord =

French general of the Napoleonic Wars

- Duke of Dino, Duke of Talleyrand, Duke of Sagan
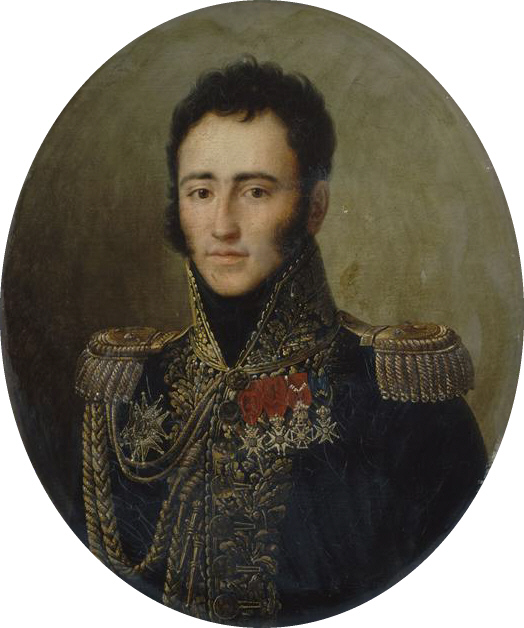
- Edmond de Talleyrand-Périgord by François-Joseph Kinson
- Born: 1 August 1787; Paris, France
- Died: 14 May 1872 (aged 84); Florence, Italy
- Spouse: Dorothea von Biron (m. 1809; div. 1824)
- Issue: Napoléon Louis de Talleyrand-Périgord; Dorothée de Talleyrand-Périgord; Alexandre de Talleyrand-Périgord; Joséphine Pauline de Talleyrand-Périgord
- Father: Archambaud de Talleyrand-Périgord
- Mother: Madeleine Olivier de Senozan de Viriville

Edmond de Talleyrand-Périgord, 2nd Duke of Talleyrand, 2nd Duke of Dino (French pronunciation: [ɛdmɔ̃ də talɛʁɑ̃ peʁiɡɔʁ]; 1 August 1787 – 14 May 1872), was a French general of the Napoleonic Wars.

== Early life ==
He was born in Paris, the son of Archambaud de Talleyrand-Périgord (1762–1838) and Madeleine Olivier de Senozan de Viriville (1764–1794), and was the nephew of the minister Charles Maurice de Talleyrand-Périgord (1754–1838), the 1st Duke of Dino.

== Career ==
In 1812, Edmond also received a regiment in Brescia (north Italy) from Talleyrand, and on 19 September 1813 was promoted to oberst. He served in the War of the Sixth Coalition, commanding three Chasseur regiments against Prussian major-general Leopold Wilhelm von Dobschütz (1763–1836) at the battle of Mühlberg in 1813, where he was captured. By October 1823 he had become lieutenant-general.

His uncle Talleyrand sought a high position for Edmond. He could not rise in France, since Napoleon had banned all French heiresses from marrying outside the French nobility and since Talleyrand had fallen from favor in 1807 after his resignation as Foreign Minister. Thus, at the Congress of Erfurt in 1808, he approached Tsar Alexander I of Russia for permission for a marriage between Edmond and Dorothea von Biron, as a reward for Talleyrand's diplomatic services. Talleyrand was certain of gaining permission from the bride's mother, since he was on friendly terms with her and since payment of her annual apanage was dependent on Russia.

== Personal life ==
On 21 April 1809, Edmond married Princess Dorothea Biron von Kurland (1793–1862) in Frankfurt am Main. Though Edmond was indifferent about the match, she was from German-Baltic nobility, as the illegitimate daughter of Count Alexander Batowski and Dorothea von Medem though her mother's husband, Peter von Biron, the last Duke of Courland, who acknowledged her as his own.

Edmond and his wife had children, but by 1812 their married life was over, with Dorothea having become his uncle's lover and (after his death in 1838) his sole heir. They first separated in March 1816 and their official separation from Edmond came in 1824. Their children were:

- Napoléon Louis de Talleyrand-Périgord, 3rd Duke of Talleyrand, Duke of Valençay (1811–1898)
- Dorothée de Talleyrand-Périgord (1812–1814), who died young
- Alexandre Edmond de Talleyrand-Périgord (1813–1894), who married Marie Valentine Joséphine de Sainte-Aldegonde (1820–1891)
- Joséphine Pauline de Talleyrand-Périgord (1820–1890), who married Henri de Castellane (1814–1847).

Talleyrand died on 14 May 1872 in Florence, Italy, where he had lived for the past 40 years.

French nobility
Preceded by Charles-Maurice de Talleyrand-Périgord	Duke of Talleyrand and Dino; 1838–1872	Succeeded by Napoléon-Louis de Talleyrand-Périgord
