= Emilio Terry =

- Born: 1890
- Died: 1969 (aged 78–79)
- Occupations: Architect, artist, interior decorator

Emilio Rene Terry y Sánchez (1890–1969), known as Emilio Terry was a French architect, artist, interior decorator and landscape designer of Cuban-Irish ancestry. Creating furniture, tapestries and objets d'art, he was influenced by the château de Chenonceau, acquired by his family, and he created a style that was at once classical and baroque, which he called the "Louis XVII style".

== Life ==
Terry was born in Paris on 13 September 1890 to Francisco Terry y Dorticós, son of a prominent Cuban family, Spanish and Irish in origin, that made its fortune in the sugar plantations. His mother, a great beauty, was the former Antonia Sánchez. His paternal grandfather was sugar baron Tomás Terry, a Venezuelan-born Irishman known as the "Cuban Croesus", and his paternal grandmother was Teresa Dorticós y Gómez de Leys, a daughter of Andrés Dorticós y Casson, the millionaire Governor of Cienfuegos, Cuba. One of his uncles, Antonio Terry, married the American soprano Sybil Sanderson.

After 1897 Francisco Terry moved his family to New York City, where Antonia and her daughter, Natividad (later Countess Stanislas de Castellane), were painted in 1897 by the Swiss-born American artist Adolfo Müller-Ury. The family later moved to France, where Francisco Terry's brother José-Emilio—his son's namesake—had purchased Château de Chenonceaux in 1891. The château was sold in 1896 to Francisco Terry.

Emilio Terry owned a villa on the Côte d'Azur and a Paris apartment at 2, place du Palais-Bourbon. He bought the Paris residence from Boni de Castellane in 1914. Boni records in his Mémoires : "I didn't have much money. […] M. Terry, brother of my sister in law Stanislas […], fell in love with my apartment, and […] and asked me to give over the lease to him. […] I sold my furniture to this noble Cuban. »

On 24 June 1934, Terry bought from his brother-in-law Stanislas de Castellane the historic château de Rochecotte, near Langeais (Indre-et-Loire), famous for having belonged to Dorothée de Courlande, duchesse of Dino and received Talleyrand on frequent visits. For 35 years, Emilio Terry restored this château and decorated it in the right period style. He bequeathed Rochecotte to his great-nephew Count Henri de Castellane, but the family sold the estate in the early 1980s. It is now a country house hotel.

He was a close friend of Julien Green who disclosed in his diaries that he was homosexual.

== Works ==
At once neoclassical and baroque, Emilio Terry designed houses, furniture, tapestries, objets d'art, gardens, and the interior decor of apartments and châteaux. He launched an architectural style which he named the "style Louis XVII", an imaginary style freely inspired by historical examples such as Palladio or Claude Nicolas Ledoux.

In 1933, Terry realised a model of a double-spiral house, called "en colimaçon" ("snail-style"), which illustrated one of his theories, that the art of architecture expressed a "dream to be realised" ("rêve à réaliser"). A 1936 portrait of Emilio Terry by Salvador Dalí shows this and other models in the foreground. Expressions of the "style Louis XVII" can be found in the work of the landscape artist Achille Duchêne and the designer Madeleine Castaing (in the latter case an amicable rivalry arose between her and Terry in the 1950s, with them both claiming to be the author of a certain motifs

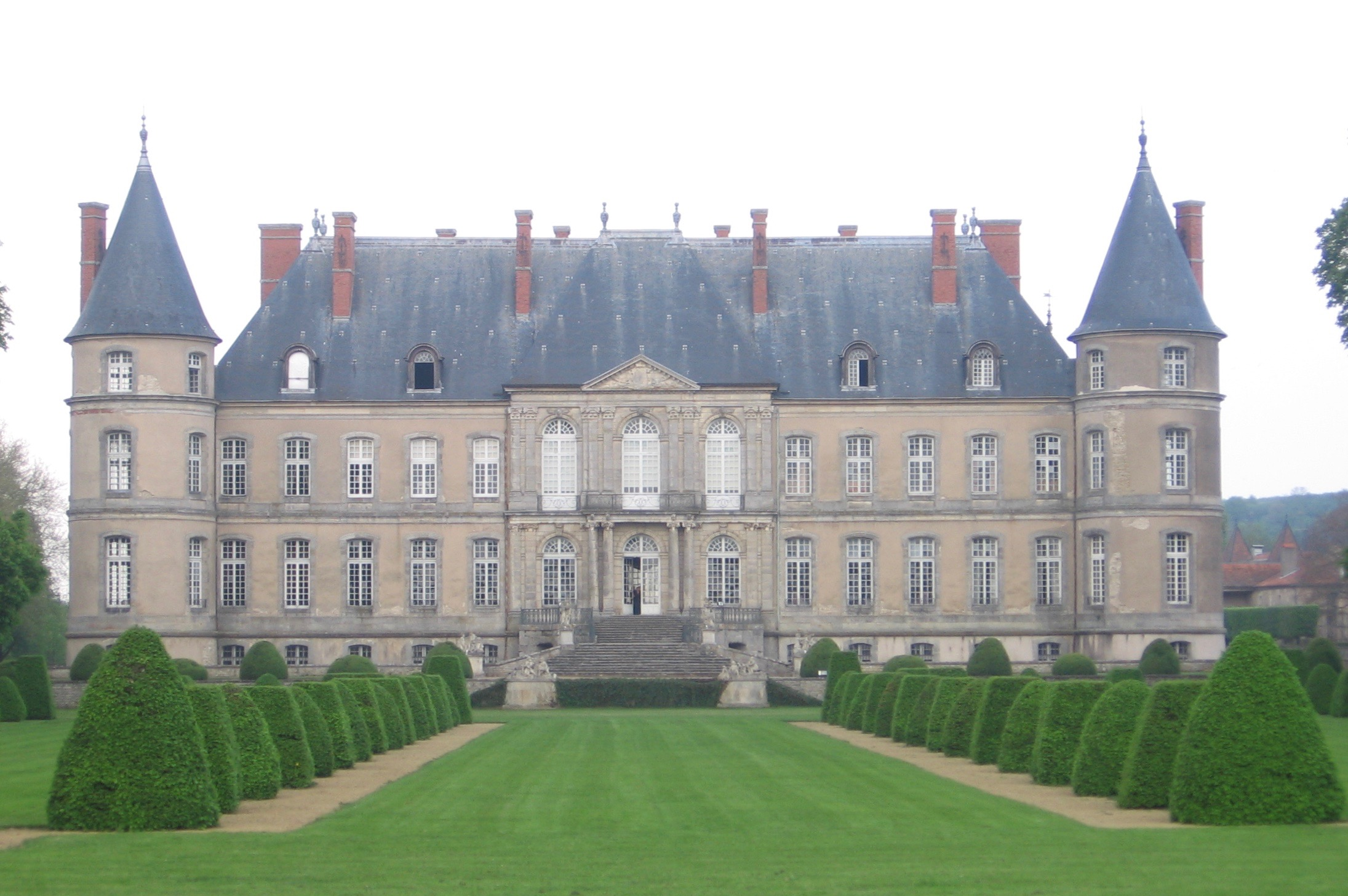
Château d'Haroué

Among his clients, Emilio Terry worked for the Greek shipping magnate Stavros Niarchos as well as Rainier III of Monaco (for whom he decorated an apartment intended for princess Grace) and the Beauvau-Craon family (for whom he redesigned the gardens around château d'Haroué in Lorraine in the French style).

From the 1950s, Emilio Terry took on the interior design of the Château de Groussay, at Montfort-l'Amaury (Yvelines), acquired in 1939 by the multi-millionaire Carlos de Beistegui. He decorated each room in collaboration with Beistegui, designed a great deal of furniture, created an Italian-style theatre for artists of the Comédie-Française, designed a new park à l'anglaise, and added 18th-century-style follies to the grounds.

=== In film ===
Groussay appeared in Marc Allégret's film Le Bal du Comte d'Orgel, with Jean-Claude Brialy, and the bibliothèque de Groussay was the setting for Frédéric Mitterrand's television broadcast Plaisir de France.

== See also ==
- Folly
- Achille Duchêne
- Madeleine Castaing
- Jacques Garcia
- Anne-Aymone Giscard d'Estaing
- Castellane family

== Bibliography ==
- Emilio Terry, Sièges d'Emilio Terry : Projets, Musée des Arts Décoratifs, RMN, 1996
- Emilio Terry, Tapis d'Emilio Terry, Musée des Arts Décoratifs, RMN, 1996
- Boni de Castellane, Mémoires, Introduction et notes d'Emmanuel de Waresquiel, Perrin, 1986
- Pierre Arizzoli-Clémentel, Emilio Terry, 1890-1969: architecte et décorateur, Gourcuff Gradenigo, 2013
