= Henri de Castellane =

Henri Charles Louis Boniface, Marquis de Castellane (23 September 1814, Paris – 16 October 1847, château de Rochecotte) was a French politician and nobleman.

== Early life ==
He was the eldest son of marshal Boniface de Castellane.

== Personal life ==
He married Pauline de Talleyrand-Périgord, bringing the château de Rochecotte into the Castellane family. Their two children were:

- Marie de Castellane (1840–1915), princess Radziwill by marriage, who published the "Chroniques de 1831 à 1862" by her grandmother Dorothea von Biron (Plon, 4 volumes, 1909)
- Antoine de Castellane (1844–1917), father to the dandy and politician Boniface de Castellane (1867–1932).

Henri died on 16 October 1847 at the château de Rochecotte.
