= Stanislas de Castellane =

French politician

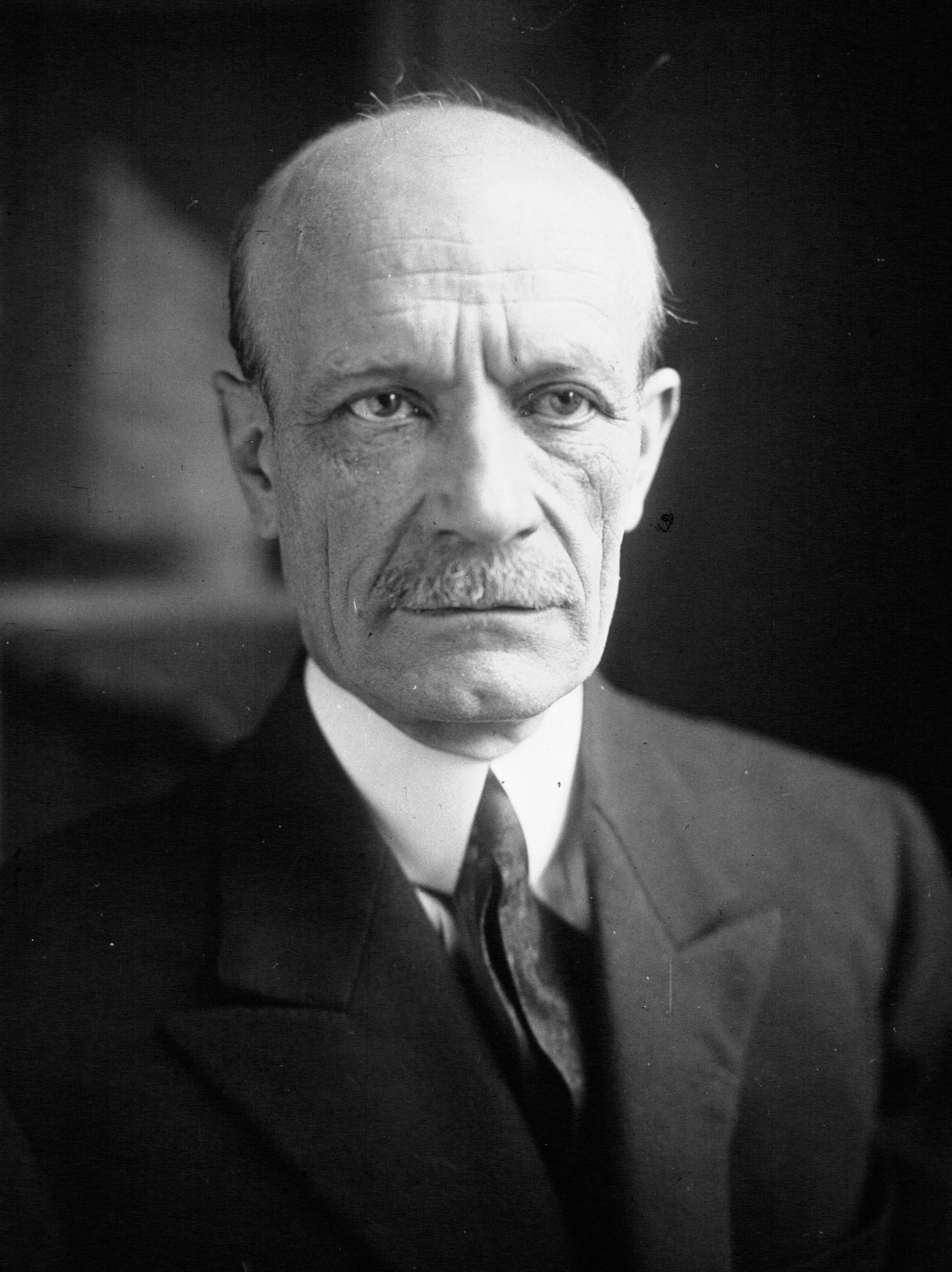
de Castellane in 1931

Stanislas de Castellane (15 October 1875 - 4 July 1959) was a French politician, representing Cantal in parliament several times between 1902 and 1940.

== Biography ==
He was born in Juigné-sur-Sarthe, the youngest son of Antoine de Castellane and a member of the House of Castellane. His elder brother was Boni de Castellane.

He studied at the Paris Institute of Political Studies and entered politics at a young age, being elected to the Chamber of Deputies as a representative of Cantal in 1902, when he was 27. He lost his seat in 1906, was reelected in 1919 and again in 1928. Between 1930 and 1932 he was vice-president of the Chamber. In 1938 he was elected senator for Cantal. Additionally, in 1905 he was elected mayor of Marcenat, holding the title until 1940.

On 10 July 1940, he voted in favour of handing over full powers to Marshal Pétain. Because of this, after the Liberation, he was declared ineligible and could not seek another parliamentary mandate.

In 1901 he married Natalia Terry y Sanchez (1877-1962), the sister of architect Emilio Terry, and had two sons: Henri (1903-1937) and François (1908-1988).

After the war he withdrew from public life and died on 4 July 1959 in Paris, age 84.
