= Alphonse de Bauffremont =

Alphonse Charles Jean de Bauffremont–Courtenay (5 February 1792 – 10 March 1860), Prince of Bauffremont, 2nd Duke of Bauffremont, Marquess of Bauffremont and of Listenois, Prince of Carency, was a French soldier and aristocrat.

== Early life ==
Bauffremont was born on 5 February 1792 in Madrid. He was the eldest son of Alexandre de Bauffremont, 1st Prince-Duke of Bauffremont (1773–1833), and Marie-Antoinette Pauline de Quélen de La Vauguyon (1771–1847). His younger brother was Théodore de Bauffremont-Courtenay (1793–1852). (Note: Théodore de Bauffremont-Courtenay (1793–1852) married Anne Élisabeth Laurence de Montmorency (1802–1860), sister to Anne Louis de Montmorency, 6th Duke of Montmorency, both children of Anne Charles François de Montmorency.)

His paternal grandfather was Joseph de Bauffremont, Prince of Listenois. His maternal grandparents were Paul François de Quélen de Stuer de Caussade, 2nd Duke of La Vauguyon, and Marie-Antoinette Rosalie de Pons de Roquefort.

== Career ==
A Prince of Bauffremont since birth, he was created Prince of Carency in 1824 (as the male line of his mother's family died out), and became 2nd Duke of Bauffremont upon the death of his father in 1833. He was made a Knight of the Order of Saint-Louis, and served as aide-de-camp to Marshal Joachim Murat during the First Empire. He distinguished himself at the Battle of Borodino and during the German campaign of 1813. During the Hundred Days, he was tasked by Murat with bringing confidential dispatches to Napoleon. As he returned to Italy, the Austrian police arrested him and sent him back to Paris. Later, he spent some time serving in the Russian army.

In 1852, he became a Senator of the Second Empire by decree. He was promoted to Commander of the Legion of Honour in 1854 and was president of the General Council of Haute-Saône for ten years.

== Personal life ==
On 16 June 1822 in Livorno, then a part of the Grand Duchy of Tuscany, Bauffremont was married to Caterina Isabella Moncada (1795–1878), daughter of Giovanni Luigi Moncada, 9th Prince of Paternò and, his second wife, Giovanna del Bosco Branciforte. Together, they were the parents of:

- Roger Alexandre Jean de Bauffremont (1823–1891), who married Laure-Adelaïde-Louise-Adrienne Leroux, daughter of stockbroker Eugène Leroux and Héloïse Bourg de Bossi, (Note: Héloïse Bourg de Bossi was a founder of the Congregation of the Franciscan Missionary Sisters of the Sacred Heart in 1861.) in 1849. Laure acquired the Château de Beauregard in La Celle-Saint-Cloud in January 1870 for the 784,000 gold francs. (Note: The Château de Beauregard in La Celle-Saint-Cloud passed to Baron Maurice de Hirsch on 20 September 1871.)
- Léopold de Bauffremont (1825–1842), who died unmarried.
- Paul Antoine Jean Charles de Bauffremont (1827–1893), a Colonel in the 1st Hussars; he married Valentine de Riquet de Caraman-Chimay, daughter of Joseph de Riquet de Caraman-Chimay, Prince of Chimay and Émilie Pellapra, in 1861. They divorced and she married Prince Georges Bibesco (son of Prince Gheorghe Bibescu and uncle of poet Anna de Noailles).

Bauffremont died on 10 March 1860 in the 8th arrondissement of Paris. He was succeeded in his titles by his eldest son Roger. Upon his death without surviving issue in 1891, the titles passed to his second son, Paul. Upon Paul's death in 1893 without male issue, the titles passed to Gontran de Bauffremont, Alphonse's nephew through his younger brother, Théodore de Bauffremont-Courtenay.

French nobility
Preceded by Alexandre de Bauffremont	Duke of Bauffremont; 1833–1860	Succeeded by Roger de Bauffremont
