= Duke of Bauffremont =

The title of Duke of Bauffremont was created in 1818 by King Louis XVIII for Alexandre de Bauffremont, Marquess of Bauffremont, Prince of Bauffremont, whom the king had previously made a Peer of France on 17 August 1815.

== List of the Dukes of Bauffremont ==
From	To	Duke of Bauffremont	Relationship to predecessor
1818	1833	Alexandre de Bauffremont (1773–1833)	Son of Joseph de Bauffremont, Prince of Listenois
1833	1860	Alphonse de Bauffremont (1792–1860)	Son of the previous
1860	1891	Roger de Bauffremont (1823–1891)	Son of the previous
1891	1893	Paul de Bauffremont (1827–1893)	Brother of the previous
1893	1897	Gontran de Bauffremont (1822–1897)	First cousin of the previous
1897	1917	Pierre Eugène de Bauffremont (1843–1917)	Son of the previous
1917	1945	Théodore Pierre de Bauffremont (1879–1945)	Son of the previous
1945	2020	Jacques de Bauffremont (1922–2020)	Son of the previous
2020	Present	Charles-Emmanuel de Bauffremont (b. 1946)	Son of the previous

== Dukes of Bauffremont ==
- Alexandre Emanuel Louis de Bauffremont (1773–1833), Marquess of Bauffremont and Listenois, Prince of Bauffremont, Peer of France in 1787, Peer of France in 1817, Duke of Bauffremont in 1818, Knight of the Royal and Military Order of Saint Louis. In 1787 he married Marie-Antoinette Pauline de Quélen de La Vauguyon (1771–1847), daughter of Paul François de Quélen de Stuer de Caussade, 2nd Duke of La Vauguyon, and Marie-Antoinette Rosalie de Pons de Roquefort. They had two sons: Alphonse de Bauffremont (below), and Théodore de Bauffremont-Courtenay (1793–1852). (Note: Théodore de Bauffremont-Courtenay (1793–1852) married Anne Élisabeth Laurence de Montmorency (1802–1860), sister to Anne Louis de Montmorency, 6th Duke of Montmorency, both children of Anne Charles François de Montmorency.)
- Alphonse Charles Jean de Bauffremont (1792–1860), son of the previous; Prince of Bauffremont, 2nd Duke of Bauffremont, Prince of Carency (1824), Knight of the Order of Saint-Louis, aide-de-camp to Marshal Murat, Senator of the Second Empire. In 1822 he married Catherine Moncada (1795–1878), daughter of Jean Louis Moncada, Prince of Paterno and Jeanne des Baux.
- Roger de Bauffremont (1823–1891), son of the previous; Prince of Bauffremont, Duke of Bauffremont, Peer of France, Prince of Carency. In 1849 he married Laure-Adelaïde-Louise-Adrienne Leroux (1832–1917), daughter of stockbroker Eugène Leroux and Héloïse Bourg de Bossi (founder of the Congregation of the Franciscan Missionary Sisters of the Sacred Heart in 1861). Laure de Bauffremont acquired the Château de Beauregard in La Celle-Saint-Cloud from Martin-Constantin Haryett in January 1870 for the 784,000 gold francs. (Note: The Château de Beauregard in La Celle-Saint-Cloud passed to Baron Maurice de Hirsch on 20 September 1871.)
- Paul Antoine Jean Charles de Bauffremont (1827–1893), brother of the previous; Prince of Bauffremont, Duke of Bauffremont, Peer of France. Colonel in the 1st Hussar then Brigadier general. In 1861 he married Valentine de Riquet de Caraman-Chimay (1839–1914), daughter of Joseph de Riquet de Caraman-Chimay, Prince of Chimay and Émilie Pellapra. After a divorce which set a precedent, she married Prince Georges Bibesco (son of Prince Gheorghe Bibescu and uncle of poet Anna de Noailles).
- Anne Antoine Gontran de Bauffremont (1822–1897), first cousin of the previous, son of Prince Théodore de Bauffremont-Courtenay (1793–1852); Prince of Bauffremont, Duke of Bauffremont, Peer of France, Prince of Carency. Grand Cross of the Order of Charles III of Spain, he married on 4 July 1842 in Paris to Noémie d'Aubusson de La Feuillade (1826–1904), daughter of Augustin Pierre, Count of La Feuillade and Blanche Rouillé du Coudray. He died at the Château de Brienne.
- Pierre Eugène de Bauffremont (1843–1917), son of the previous; Prince of Bauffremont, Duke of Bauffremont, Peer of France, Prince of Carency. Grand Cross of the Order of Isabella the Catholic, Grand Cross of the Order of Saints Maurice and Lazarus. He published a tribute to Léoville L'Homme, poet of Mauritius, in Paris. He married on 11 March 1865 in Madrid to Maria Cristina Osorio de Moscoso y de Borbón (1850–1904), Duchess of Atrisco, 10th Marchioness of Leganes, Marchioness of Morata de la Vega, Grandee of Spain of the 1st Class, daughter of the José María Osorio de Moscoso y Carvajal, 16th Duke of Sessa, and Luisa Teresa de Borbón, Infanta of Spain.
- Pierre d'Alcantara Laurent Joseph Marie Alexandre Théodore de Bauffremont (1879–1945), son of the previous; Prince of Bauffremont, 7th Duke of Bauffremont, Grandee of Spain 1st Class, Duke of Atrisco, etc. He married on 22 January 1907 in Paris to Thérèse Octavie Walter-Chevrier de La Bouchardière (1877–1959). They had five children.
- Jacques Yblet Napoléon Marie Alexandre de Bauffremont (1922–2020), son of the previous; Prince of Bauffremont, 8th Duke of Bauffremont; Bailly Grand Cross of Justice of the Sacred and Military Constantinian Order of Saint George (1976). He married 14 July 1943 in Paris to Sybille Charlotte Pauline Marie de Chabannes du Verger (1922–2005), daughter of Gabriel de Chabannes and Mahaut de Béthune-Sully des Planques-Sully. They had four children.
- Charles-Emmanuel Marie Claude Gabriel de Bauffremont (b. 1946), son of the previous; President of the Institute of the House of Bourbon since 2009, Knight of the Order of Malta. Married to Blanche de Chabannes (1947–2019), daughter of Count Michel de Chabannes (1915–1994) and Countess Marie-Anne d'Harcourt (1923-1986). They have six children.

== See also ==
- Bauffremont
