= Giovanni Luigi Moncada =

Italian nobleman

Don Giovanni Luigi Moncada 9th Prince of Paternò
- Other titles: 8th Duke of San Giovanni, 19th Count of Caltanissetta, 19th Count of Adernò, Centuripe and Biancavilla, 16th Count of Cammarata, Grandee of Spain
- Born: 22 April 1745; Palermo, Kingdom of Sicily
- Died: 27 August 1827 (aged 82); Catania, Kingdom of the Two Sicilies
- Noble family: Moncada di Paternò
- Spouses: Agata Branciforte Branciforte (m. 1761; died 1783) Giovanna del Bosco Branciforte (m. 1793; died 1827)
- Issue: with Agata: Francesco Rodrigo; Maria Giuseppa; Salvatore; Beatrice; Giovanna; Caterina Teresa; Maria Teresa; Guglielmo; Andrea; with Giovanna: Caterina Isabella; Matteo; Maria Agata
- Father: Francesco Rodrigo Moncada
- Mother: Giuseppina Ruffo Migliorino

Don Giovanni Luigi Moncada, 9th Prince of Paternò (22 April 1745 – 27 August 1827), was an Italian nobleman and politician.

== Early life ==
Moncada was born in Palermo on 22 April 1745. He was the youngest of six children born to Francesco Rodrigo Moncada, 8th Prince of Paternò (1696–1763), and Giuseppina Ruffo dei Principi della Scaletta (1707–1786). His only sibling to live to maturity was Bernardino Castrense Moncada and Giovanna Moncada, who married Bartolomeo Avarna, 1st Duke of Gualtieri.

His paternal grandparents were Luigi Guglielmo Moncada, 7th Prince of Paternò, and Giovanna Ventimiglia e Pignatelli. His maternal grandparents were Giovanni Ruffo La Rocca, Prince of Scaletta, and Anna Maria Migliorino Balsam.

Immediately after his 1761 marriage at only sixteen, he lived for many years in Naples, during the Bourbon reform period, where he studied politics and economics. Moncada soon became part of the Neapolitan court, whose presence was strengthened in particular after the marriage in 1781 between his firstborn son, Francesco Rodrigo, and Giovanna Beccadelli of Bologna, daughter of the Prince of Camporeale, belonging to a Sicilian dynasty that had been part of the Neapolitan aristocracy since the 15th century, and faithful to the Bourbons.

== Career ==
Between 1762 and 1763, Prince Francesco Rodrigo Moncada, his father, and Bernardino Castrense Moncada, his elder brother, both died. He thus succeeded the first in the titles and fiefs of the family, such as the Principality of Paternò, the Duchy of San Giovanni, the Counties of Caltanissetta and Cammarata, and the various Baronies and Lordships, of which he obtained investiture on 16 December 1764. From 1763, he also had the title of Grandee of Spain, First Class.

In 1771, he began a work of patrimonial reorganization, managing to remove the feudal states from the Deputation of the Kingdom of Sicily and to regain full possession of them. He also managed to recover some fiefs previously alienated - such as the Nisseno fief of Mimiano, returned to him by the Duke of Villarosa, and claimed others. The action undertaken by the Prince generated the hostility of the local nobilities of Caltanissetta and Paternò, who in 1779, as in 1754, asked for the reduction of the respective cities to the state domain. Among the feudal domains claimed by the Prince of Paternò, there was the County of Adernò together with the lands of Biancavilla and Centorbi, of which he obtained restitution following a sentence issued by the Tribunal of the Consistory of the Sacred Royal Conscience on 25 June 1797, and of which he received investiture on 20 October of the same year, having been taken from Francesco Borgia Alvarez de Toledo, Duke of Fernandina. The Duke of Fernandina was also condemned to pay the Prince of Paternò a substantial compensation of 40,000 scudi, for the income accrued on the lands that he returned to him.

Moncada thus became the richest aristocrat in Sicily, with feudal possessions that extended to many areas of the island, particularly in the Catania area: in 1808, the vast patrimony of the Prince of Paternò brought him an overall annual income of 93,048 ounces, mostly due to the taxes paid by his vassals.

=== Kidnapping by the Bey of Tunis ===
In the summer of 1797, while journeying from Palermo to Naples, his ship was ambushed near Ustica by a group of Tunisian pirates who captured him. The Prince of Paternò, who had embarked with a treasure of 50,000 scudi, as well as jewels, silverware, horses and gifts for the Neapolitan court, was taken to Tunis where he was held prisoner by the Bey of Tunis, Hammuda ibn Ali. After months of negotiating, an agreement was reached for his ransom on the basis of a large sum of 300,000 scudi to be paid to the Bey of Tunis, of which 60,000 was in cash, and the rest in installments or from money obtained from the disposal of part of his enormous patrimony.

The affair even ended up in court, and in 1800, the Commercial Court condemned Moncada to pay the debt contracted with the Tunisian Bey, ordering him to deposit the remaining sum of his ransom in the Palermo Pecuniary Board. Following this sentence, in 1802, King Ferdinand III ordered the seizure of some of the Prince's income to cover the costs of the trial and the payment of the debt, which the Bourbon State partly advanced. Don Giovanni Luigi was also forced to dismember part of his patrimony and to mortgage some of his fiefs.

=== Political career ===
Moncada's political career began in 1770 when he became a Deputy of the Kingdom of Sicily for the first time, a position he also held in 1778, 1790 and 1794. He was Captain of Justice in the Sicilian capital from 1777 to 1780.

He served as a Gentleman of the Chamber of King Ferdinand III in 1782, after the abolition of feudalism in the Kingdom of Sicily in 1812, which occurred following the promulgation in the same year of the constitution granted by the Bourbon sovereign, which led to the institution of the Sicilian Parliament, the Prince of Paternò obtained a hereditary seat in the House of Peers of the Parliament.

== Personal life ==
In 1761, Moncada married Princess Agata Branciforte (1740–1783), daughter of Ercole Branciforte, 4th Prince of Scordia, and Beatrice Branciforte, Princess of Leonforte. Before her death in 1783, they were the parents of nine children:

- Francesco Rodrigo Moncada (1762–1816), who married Giovanna Beccadelli di Bologna e Montaperto, a daughter of Giuseppe Beccadelli, 6th Prince of Camporeale.
- Maria Giuseppa Moncada (1764–1823), who married Fabrizio Alliata e Colonna, 6th Prince of Villafranca. After his death, she married German Colonel Thaddäus Lich.
- Salvatore Moncada (1765–1824)
- Beatrice Moncada (1766–1769), who died young.
- Giovanna Moncada (1767–1767), who died young.
- Caterina Teresa Moncada (1768–1769), who died young.
- Maria Teresa Moncada (1770–1837), who married Giuseppe Bonanno, 8th Prince of Roccafiorita.
- Guglielmo Moncada (1773–1847), who married Maria Concetta Spinelli, a daughter of Vincenzo Spinelli, 10th Duke of Laurino. After her death, he married Sebastiana Gallotti.
- Andrea Moncada (1774–1831).

In 1793, ten years after the death of his first wife, he married the young noblewoman Giovanna del Bosco Branciforte (b. 1771), a lady-in-waiting of Queen Maria Carolina. Giovanna was a daughter of Vincenzo del Bosco, 6th Prince of Belvedere, and Caterina Branciforte. Together, they had three more children:

- Caterina Isabella Moncada (1795–1878), who married Giuseppe Moncada di Paternò Branciforte Beccadelli di Bologna, son of Francesco Rodrigo, in 1809. After his death, she married, Alphonse de Bauffremont, 2nd Prince-Duke of Bauffremont-Courtenay, in 1822.
- Matteo Moncada (b. 1797)
- Maria Agata Moncada (1803–1862), who married Carlo Filangieri, 6th Prince of Satriano, the son of Gaetano Filangieri, 5th Prince of Satriano.

Moncada died in Catania on 27 August 1827. He was buried in the Church of San Nicolò next to the cemetery of Centuripe, which he had built and inaugurated in 1817.

=== Descendants ===
Through his daughter Caterina, he was a grandfather of Giovanna Moncada (1810–1903), who married Giovanni Francesco Statella, 13th Prince of Cassaro; Roger de Bauffremont, 3rd Prince-Duke of Bauffremont (1823–1891); and Paul de Bauffremont, 4th Prince-Duke of Bauffremont-Courtenay (1827–1893), who married Valentine de Riquet de Caraman-Chimay.

Through his youngest daughter Agata, he was a grandfather of Gaetano Filangieri, 7th Prince of Satriano (1824–1892), an art historian and collector who founded the Museo Civico Filangieri.
