= Alexandre de Bauffremont =

Alexandre Emanuel Louis de Bauffremont (27 April 1773 – 23 December 1833) was Prince-Duke of Bauffremont.

== Early life ==
Prince Alexandre was born in Paris on 27 April 1773. He was a son of Joseph de Bauffremont, Prince of Listenois, and Princess Louise Bénigne de Bauffremont-Courtenay (a daughter of Louis de Bauffremont). Among his siblings were Hélène de Bauffremont-Courtenay (wife of Marie-Gabriel-Florent-Auguste de Choiseul-Gouffier) and Hortense Geneviève Marie Anne de Bauffremont-Courtenay (wife of Pierre Jules de Ferrari and Joseph Augustin de Narbonne-Lara).

== Career ==
He emigrated to Koblenz on the French Revolution but rallied to Napoleon and accepted the title of comte de l'Empire. He was made a peer of France in 1815 by King Louis XVIII.

== Personal life ==
In 1787 he married Marie-Antoinette de Quélen de La Vauguyon, daughter of Paul François de Quelen de La Vauguyon. Together, they were the parents of:

- Alphonse Charles Jean, Prince-Duke of Bauffremont (1792–1860), who married Caterina Isabella Moncada, daughter of Giovanni Luigi Moncada, 9th Prince of Paternò.
- Théodore Paul Alexandre Demétrius de Bauffremont-Courtenay (1793–1853), who married Anne Élisabeth Laurence de Montmorency, sister to Anne Louis de Montmorency, 6th Duke of Montmorency, both children of Anne Charles François de Montmorency.

Bauffremont died on 23 December 1833.

=== Descendants ===
Through his son Alphonse, he was a grandfather of Paul Antoine Jean Charles, Prince-Duke of Bauffremont-Courtenay (1827–1893), who married, and divorced, Countess Valentine de Riquet de Caraman-Chimay, the younger daughter of Belgian diplomat and industrialist Joseph de Riquet de Caraman, 17th Prince de Chimay.

Through his son Théodore, he was a grandfather of Anne Antoine Gontran de Bauffremont-Courtenay (1822–1897), who married Noëmie d'Aubusson de La Feuillade.
