= Nicolas Raoul Adalbert de Talleyrand-Périgord =

- Duke of Montmorency
- Born: 20 March 1837; Paris, France
- Died: 25 March 1915 (aged 78); Paris, France
- Spouse: Ida Marie Carmen Aguado y MacDonnel (m. 1866; died 1880)
- Issue: Napoléon Louis Eugène Alexandre Anne Emmanuel de Talleyrand-Périgord
- House: Talleyrand-Périgord
- Father: Louis de Talleyrand-Périgord
- Mother: Anne Louise Charlotte de Montmorency

Nicolas Raoul Adalbert de Talleyrand-Périgord (20 March 1837 – 25 March 1915), 7th Duke of Montmorency, was a French aristocrat.

== Early life ==
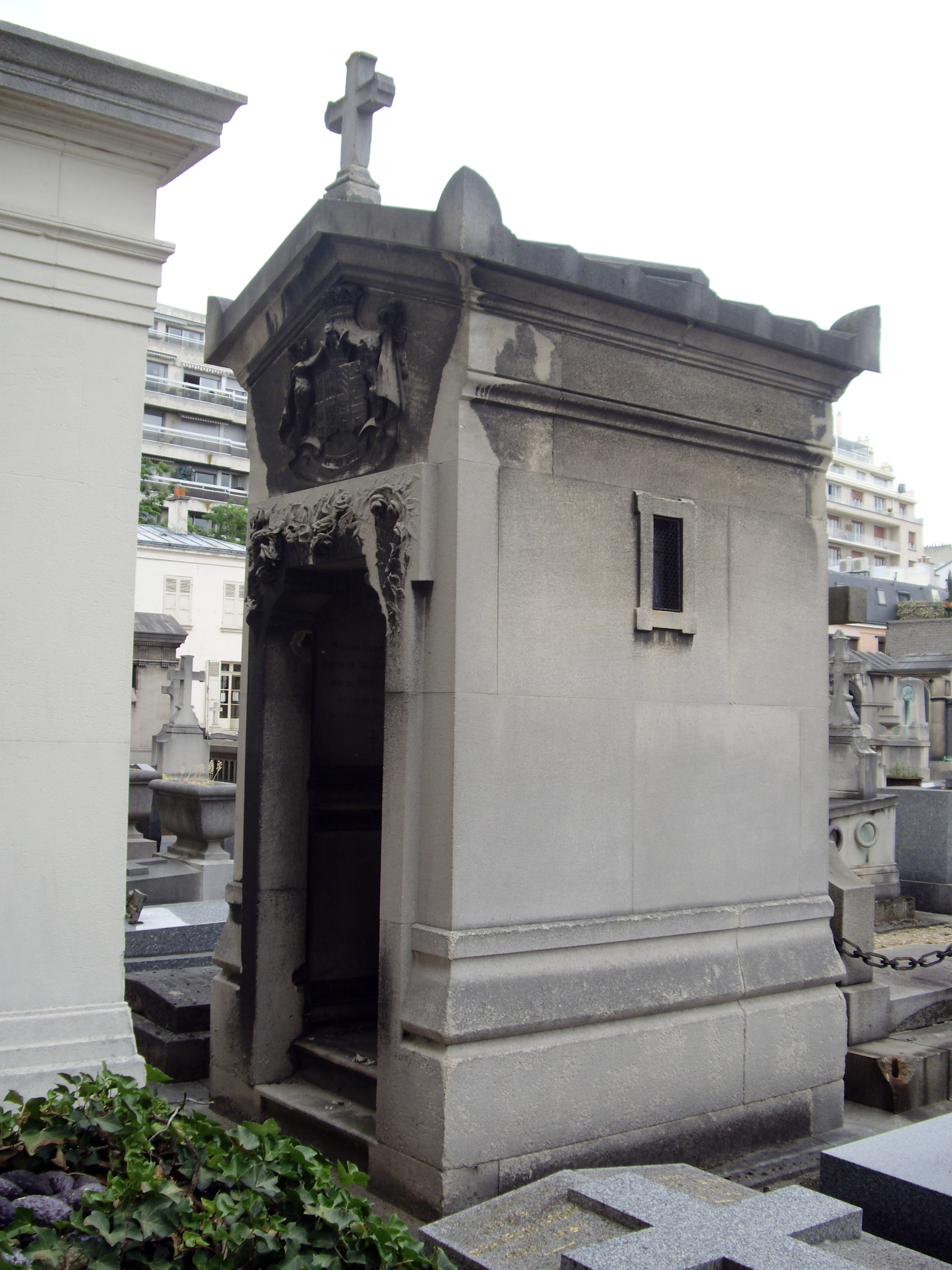
Chapel of the Dukes of Montmorency, at the Cimetière d'Auteuil in Paris

He was born on 20 March 1837 in Paris. He was the youngest son of Louis de Talleyrand-Périgord and, his first wife, Anne Louise Charlotte de Montmorency. His siblings included Caroline Valentine de Talleyrand-Périgord (wife of Vicomte Charles Henri d'Etchegoyen), Boson de Talleyrand-Périgord, 4th Duke of Talleyrand-Périgord, After his mother died in 1858, his father married the Countess Hatzfeldt, née Rachel Elisabeth Pauline de Castellane (widow of Max von Hatzfeldt and daughter of Marshal Boniface de Castellane). From his father's second marriage, his younger half-sister was Dorothée de Talleyrand-Périgord (wife of Karl Egon IV, the Prince of Furstenberg and Count Jean de Castellane).

His paternal grandparents were General Edmond de Talleyrand-Périgord, 2nd Duke of Dino and, later, the 2nd Duke of Talleyrand-Périgord, and Princess Dorothea of Courland, Duchess of Sagan. His aunt, Pauline de Talleyrand-Périgord, married Henri de Castellane. His maternal grandparents were Anne Charles François de Montmorency, 5th Duke of Montmorency, and Anne Louise Caroline de Goyon de Matignon, Countess de Gacé (sister to Anne Louis Raoul Victor de Montmorency, 6th Duke of Montmorency).

== Career ==
Upon the death of his uncle, in 1862, he became the Duke of Montmorency (third creation). The title had originally been created in 1688 as the Duke of Beaufort (second creation) but was changed to Duke of Montmorency in 1689. Before he succeeded to the title, he was known as the Count of Périgord.

He was prominent at the Court of Napoleon III and was a member of the Union Artistique.

== Personal life ==
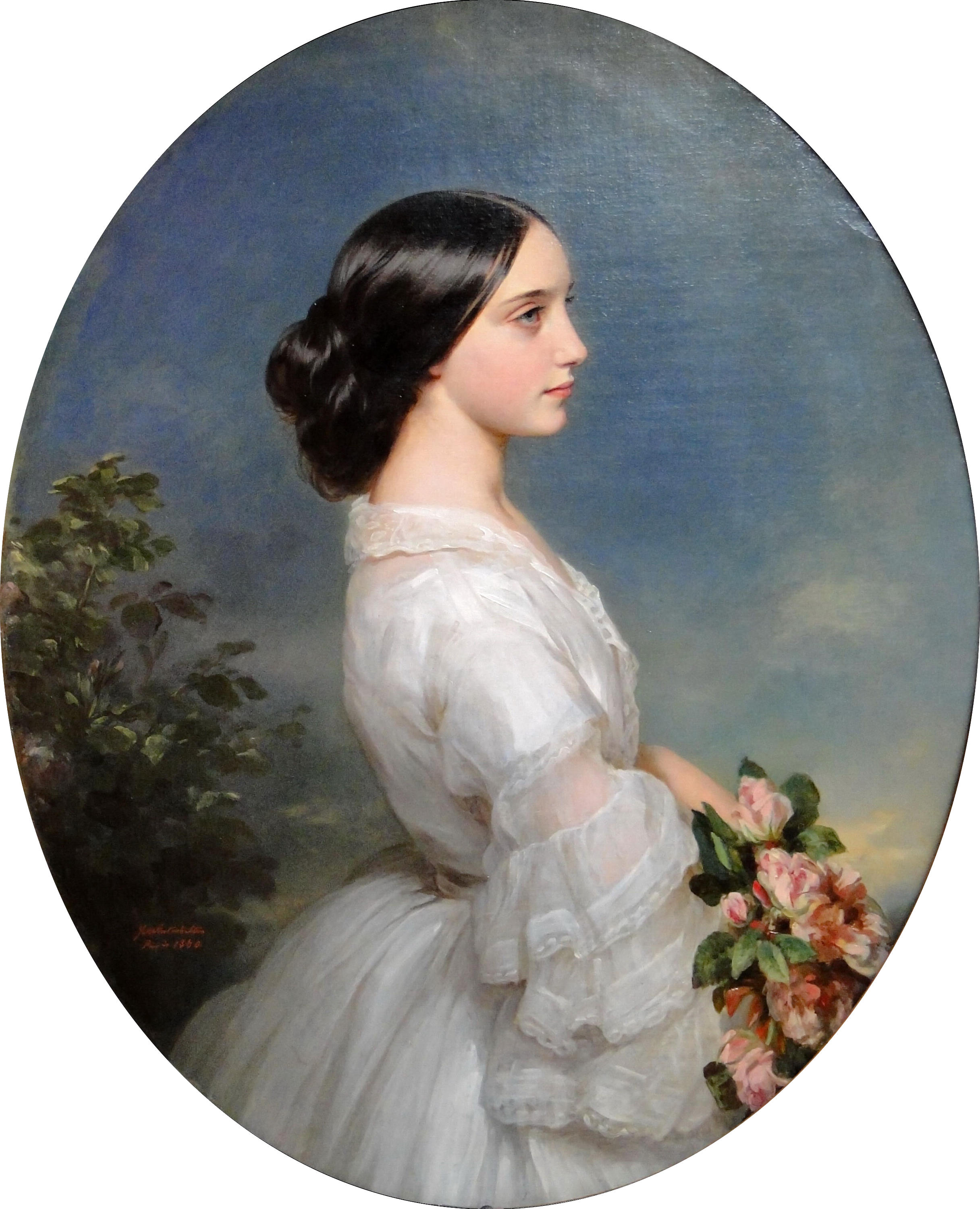
Portrait of his wife, Carmen, by Franz Xaver Winterhalter, 1860

On 2 June 1866, he was married to Ida Marie Carmen Aguado y MacDonnel (1847–1880), a daughter of Alexandre Aguado, 2nd Marqués of las Marismas del Guadalquivir and Claire Emilie MacDonnel, a lady-in-waiting to Empress Eugénie. Before her death, they were the parents of one son:

- Napoléon Louis Eugène Alexandre Anne Emmanuel de Talleyrand-Périgord (1867–1951), who married Marie-Joséphine-Henriette-Anne de Rohan-Chabot, eldest daughter of Alain de Rohan-Chabot, 11th Duke of Rohan and Herminie de La Brousse de Verteillac in 1891. After her death in 1903, he married wealthy American heiress Cécile (née Ulman) Blumenthal, widow of New York leather merchant Ferdinand Blumenthal, in 1917. After her death in 1927, he married Gabrielle-Ida (née Lefaivre) Grandjean, the widow of industrialist Armand-Augustin-Georges Grandjean and daughter of the French diplomat Alexis-Jules Lefaivre, in 1950. where her father was stationed.

His wife died in Arcachon, Gironde, Nouvelle-Aquitaine in 1880. The Duke died in 1915. After his death, his son inherited the dukedom. Upon his son's death in Paris in 1951, the dukedom of Montmorency became extinct.

French nobility
| Preceded by Anne Louis Raoul Victor de Montmorency | Duke of Montmorency; 1862–1915 | Succeeded by Napoléon Louis Eugène de Talleyrand-Périgord |
