= Paul de Bauffremont =

French general

Paul Antoine Jean Charles, Duke of Bauffremont (11 December 1827, Palermo, Italy – 2 November 1893, Paris, France) was a French general, most notable for leading the Charge de Sedan alongside Gaston Alexandre Auguste. He was also the first husband of Valentine de Riquet de Caraman-Chimay, whom he divorced in 1875.

== Early life ==
Bauffremont was born on 11 December 1827 in Palermo, Italy. He was the son of Alphonse de Bauffremont (1792–1860) and Caterina Isabella Moncada (1795–1878). His mother was a member of the House of Moncada, a Spanish and Italian aristocratic noble family House with important ramifications in Sicily.

His paternal grandparents were Alexandre Emanuel Louis, Prince of Bauffremont, and Marie Antoinette Rosalie Pauline de Quélen (a daughter of Paul François de Quélen de Stuer de Caussade, 2nd Duke of La Vauguyon). His maternal grandparents were Giovanni Luigi Moncada, 9th Prince of Paternò, and Giovanna Emanuele Maria delle Bosco e Bosco di Branciforte (a daughter of Vincenzo del Bosco, 6th Prince of Belvedere).

== Career ==
A student at École spéciale militaire de Saint-Cyr, he left in 1848 to join the cavalry. Promoted to captain, he was the first to enter Ouargla in Algeria in 1854.

In 1856 he was part of the Embassy sent to Russia. As captain in the 6th Hussars, he fought in the Italian campaign; as Lieutenant-colonel, in Mexico (1865–1867) with the 5th Hussar Regiment and the 1st Marching Cavalry Regiment.

As Colonel of the 1st Hussar Regiment in 1867, he commanded the famous the Charge de Sedan alongside Gaston Alexandre Auguste in 1870 where he had two horses killed under him. Prisoner, he returned from captivity to resume command of the 7th Hussars. Bauffremont was made Brigadier General on 9 November 1876, before becoming General Councilor of Haute-Saône.

For his military efforts, he was made an Officer of the Legion of Honor.

== Personal life ==
Bauffremont was married to Countess Valentine Marie Henriette de Riquet de Caraman–Chimay (1839–1914) on 13 April 1861. She was a younger daughter of Belgian diplomat and industrialist Joseph de Riquet de Caraman, 17th Prince de Chimay, and memoirist Émilie Pellapra (the widow of the Comte de Brigode). Before their divorce in 1875, they were the parents of two daughters:

- Princess Catherine-Marie-Josèphine de Bauffremont-Courtenay (1862–1932), who married diplomat Nicolas Wlassow, in Bucharest in 1888.
- Princess Jeanne-Marie-Émilie de Bauffremont-Courtenay (1864–1935), who married Don Luigi Sanfelice, Prince of Viggiano.

The Prince of Bauffremont obtained a judgment from the Civil Court of the Seine on 10 March 1876 declaring the marriage null and void and removing custody of the children from the Princess, a judgment confirmed by the Paris Court of Appeal on 27 July 1876, then by the Court of Cassation. A ruling by the Paris Court of Appeal ordered the Princess to return the children under penalty of 1,000 Francs per day. After a year of resistance, the amount of the penalty reached 300,000 francs: Bauffremont had the penalty liquidated and the Château de Menars in Loir-et-Cher, which the Princess had inherited from her mother in 1871, seized. The château was sold at auction on 16 July 1876. (Note: Before their divorce, Valentine gave birth to a daughter, Marcela, she conceived with Romanian Prince Georges Bibescu (son of Prince of Wallachia Gheorghe Bibescu and, his first wife, Zoe Brâncoveanu).)

Bauffremont died in Paris on 2 November 1893. The Princess died on 25 August 1914.

French nobility
Preceded by Roger de Bauffremont	Duke of Bauffremont; 1891–1893	Succeeded by Gontran de Bauffremont
