= Musée de poupées et de jouets =

Musée des poupées et des jouets de Josselin
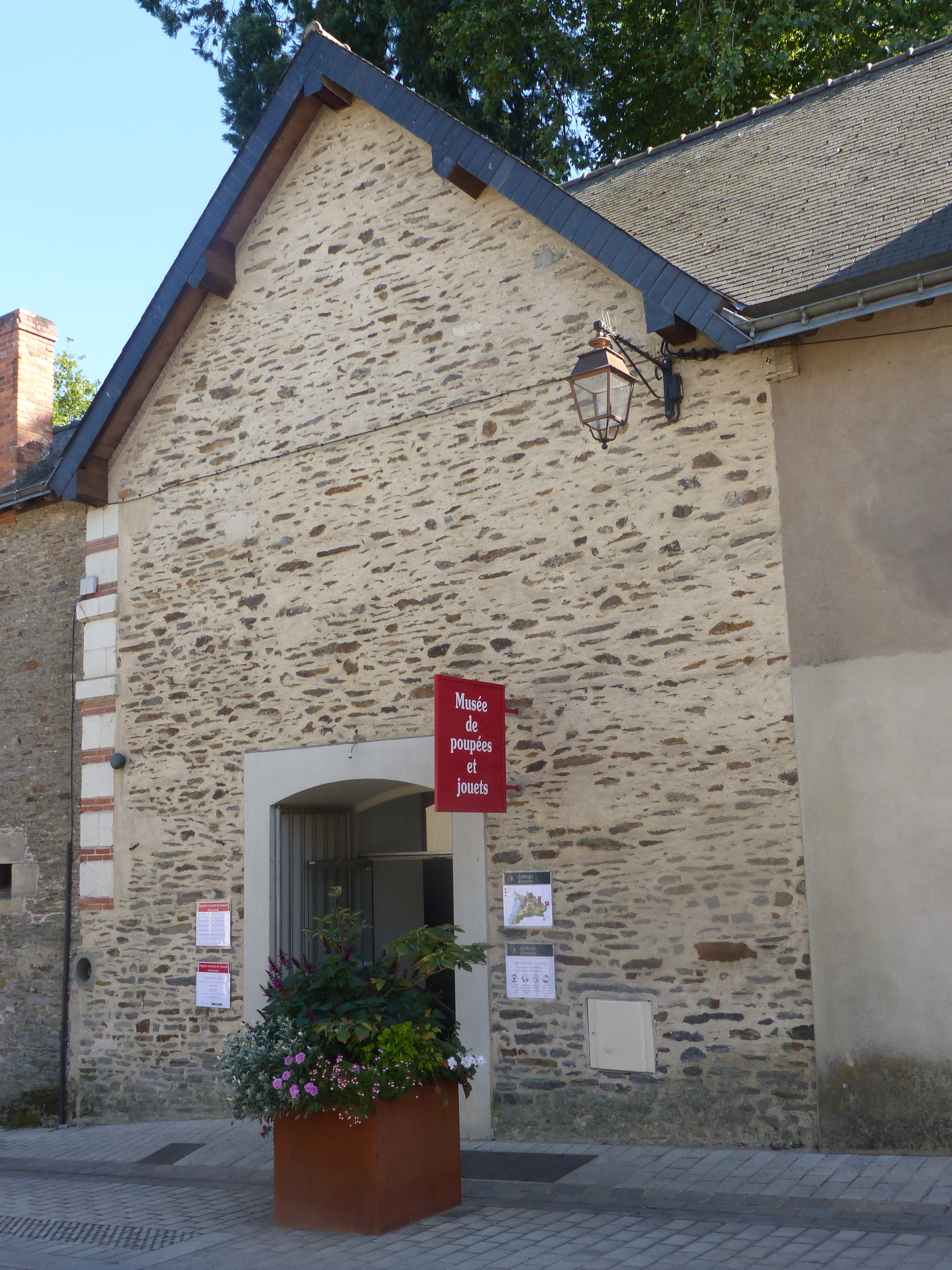
- Location: Château de Josselin, Morbihan, Brittany, France
- Coordinates: 47.953036°N 2.546163°W
- Type: Private museum
- Collections: Games, toys, dolls
- Founder: Duchess Herminie de Rohan
- Website: Official website

The Musée des poupées et des jouets de Josselin is a private museum located in the Château de Josselin, in Morbihan, Brittany, France. It presents collections of games and toys, including dolls from the personal collection of the Rohan family.

== History ==
The museum's collection was established through donations and travel souvenirs brought back by Duchess Herminie de Rohan at the end of the 19th century. According to the museum's official website, these objects were discovered by Antoinette de Rohan, in the attic of the Château de Josselin, in the early 1980s. The inventory of the discovered objects took several years. The museum was founded by the Duchess of Rohan in 1984, with a collection base of around a hundred dolls.

== Collections ==
This museum presents ancient objects related to toys, such as games, dolls, and music boxes. The oldest dolls on display date back to the 17th century. The exhibited dolls are both of French origin and from other countries, notably Russia.

Over the years, donations have allowed to enrich the initial collection. Since 1988, this museum has offered a thematic exhibition each year.

According to the official website, this museum represents the largest private collection of dolls and toys in France. In 1997, Christian Bretet and Alain Decouche mentioned this museum in their ''Guide des musées insolites européens''.

== See also ==
- Official website
