= Ramon I de Montcada =

Arms of the House of Montcada.

Ramon I de Montcada or Ramón I de Moncada (b. 1150 – d. 1190 or 1191) was a Catalan noble from Tortosa of the House of Montcada and a diplomat in the service of the crown. He was head of the House Moncada and the Seneschal of Barcelona from 1173 to 1181.

== Family Origins ==
Ramon I de Montcada was the son of Guillem Ramon I de Montcada and his wife, Beatriu de Montcada. The House of Montcada was a noble household that would rise to significant prominence in the coming generations in service to the Crown of Aragon.

== Biography ==
Ramon I de Montcada's earliest appointment was that of Seneschal of Barcelona from 1173 to 1181. It appears that his father, Guillem Ramon I de Montcada held the title immediately before Ramon I until his death in 1173 making the transfer hereditary. Ramon I later served as a diplomat in the courts of Raymond VI of Toulouse, Alfonso VIII of Castile, Ferdinand II of León and Alfonso IX of León. He was involved in diplomacy with the Byzantine Emperor and also managed a failed marriage agreement between the Count of Provence, Ramon Berenguer III and Eudokia Komnene. While he was in Constantinople, he commissioned a translation of the liturgy of John Chrysostom from Leo Tuscus.

== Marriage and Descendants ==
Ramon I de Montcada married Ramona de Tornamira and the couple had the following children:

- Guillem Ramon II de Montcada - Heir to the Seneschal of Barcelona
- Ramon II de Montcada - Knight of the Kingdom of Aragon and Lord of Tortosa
- Felipa de Montcada - Married Raymond-Roger, Count of Foix

== See also ==
- House of Montcada
- Raymond VI of Toulouse
