= Napoléon Louis Eugène Alexandre Anne Emmanuel de Talleyrand-Périgord =

Napoléon Louis de Talleyrand-Périgord
- Duke of Montmorency
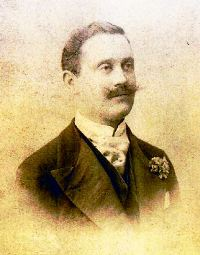
- Born: 22 March 1867; Paris, France
- Died: 26 September 1951 (aged 84); Paris, France
- Spouse: Anne de Rohan-Chabot (m. 1891; died 1903) Cécile Ulman Blumenthal (m. 1917; died 1927) Gabrielle Lefaivre Grandjean (m. 1950; died 1951)
- House: Talleyrand-Périgord
- Father: Nicolas Raoul Adalbert de Talleyrand-Périgord
- Mother: Ida Marie Carmen Aguado y MacDonnel

Napoléon Louis Eugène Alexandre Anne Emmanuel de Talleyrand-Périgord (22 March 1867 – 26 September 1951), 8th Duke of Montmorency, was a French aristocrat and soldier.

== Early life ==
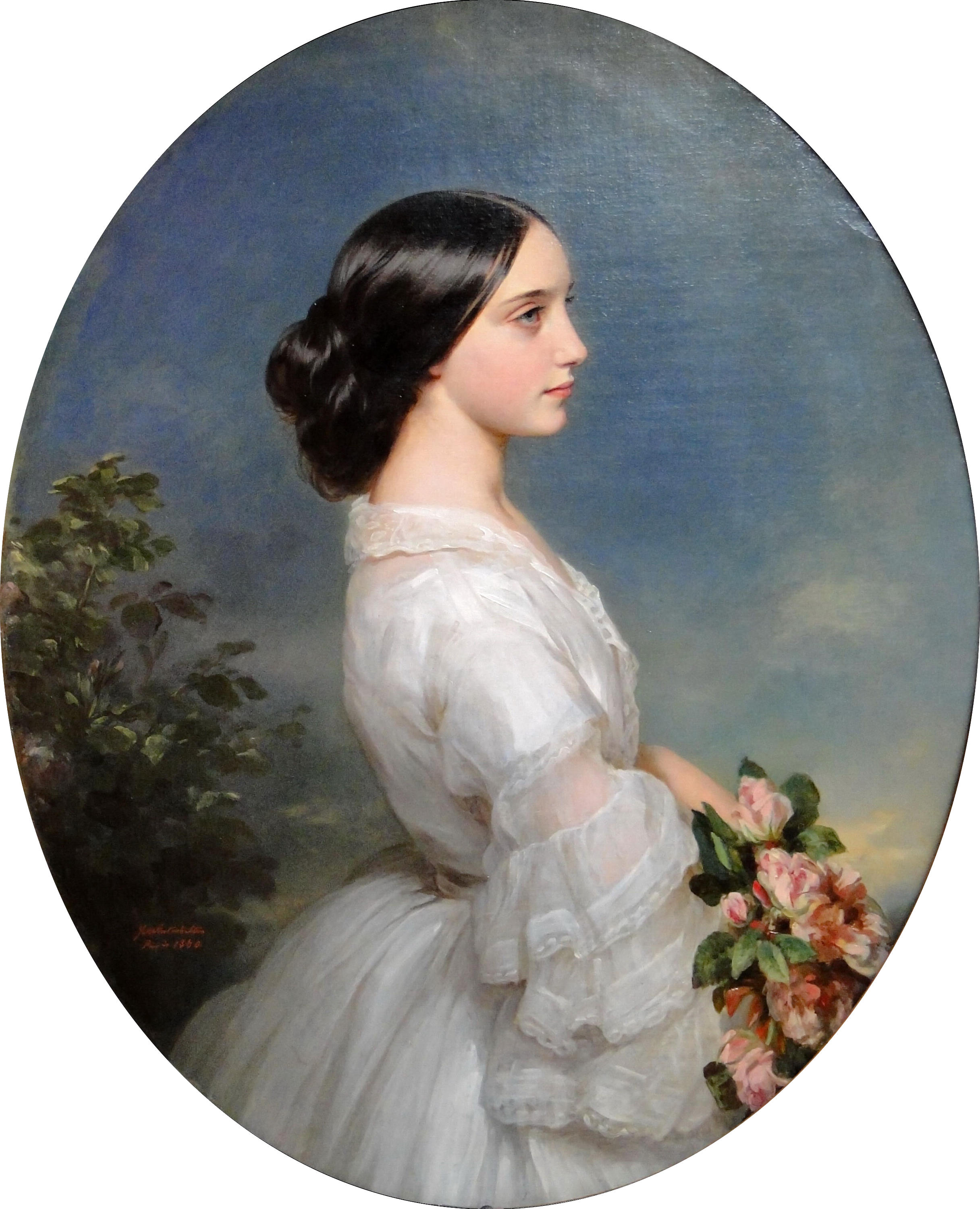
Portrait of his mother, Carmen Aguado, Duchesse de Montmorency, by Franz Xaver Winterhalter, 1860

He was born on 22 March 1867 in Paris, France. He was the only son of Nicolas Raoul Adalbert de Talleyrand-Périgord (1837–1915), Duke of Montmorency, and Ida Marie Carmen Aguado y MacDonnel (1847–1880). His mother died in Arcachon, Gironde, Nouvelle-Aquitaine in 1880. His father was prominent at the Court of Napoleon III and was a member of the Union Artistique.

His maternal grandparents were Alexandre Aguado, 2nd Marqués of las Marismas del Guadalquivir and Claire Emilie MacDonnel, a lady-in-waiting to Empress Eugénie. His paternal grandparents were Louis de Talleyrand-Périgord and, his first wife, Anne Louise Charlotte de Montmorency. Among his extended paternal family were Caroline Valentine de Talleyrand-Périgord (wife of Vicomte Charles Henri d'Etchegoyen), Boson de Talleyrand-Périgord, 4th Duke of Talleyrand-Périgord, His great-aunt, Pauline de Talleyrand-Périgord, married Henri de Castellane. From his grandfather's second marriage to Rachel Elisabeth Pauline de Castellane (widow of Max von Hatzfeldt and daughter of Boniface de Castellane), his aunt was Marie Dorothée Louise Valençay de Talleyrand-Périgord (wife of Karl Egon IV, the Prince of Furstenberg and Jean de Castellane).

== Career ==
Upon the death of his father in 1915, he became the Duke of Montmorency (third creation). The title had originally been created in 1688 as the Duke of Beaufort (second creation) but was changed to Duke of Montmorency in 1689. Before he succeeded to the title, he was known as the Count of Périgord.

In 1917, he was a Captain on the General Staff of the French Army. He was an honorary member of the Society of the Cincinnati, the fraternal, hereditary society founded in 1783 to commemorate the American Revolutionary War for descendants of military officers who served in the Continental Army.

== Personal life ==
The Duke was married three times. His first marriage was on 30 June 1891 in Paris to Marie-Joséphine-Henriette-Anne de Rohan-Chabot (1873–1903). She was the eldest daughter of Alain de Rohan-Chabot, 11th Duke of Rohan and Herminie de La Brousse de Verteillac. Her sister Marie de Rohan Chabot, was the wife of Prince Lucien Napoléon Murat, and Count Charles de Chambrun. Her brother, Josselin de Rohan Chabot, 12th Duke of Rohan, was killed in 1916 during World War I. She died in Paris in 1903.

=== Second marriage ===
After the death of his first wife, he married wealthy American heiress Cécile (née Ulman) Blumenthal (1863–1927) on 14 November 1917 at the Church of Saint-Pierre-du-Gros-Caillou in Paris. She was escorted down the aisle by U.S. Ambassador William G. Sharp. The widow of New York leather merchant Ferdinand Blumenthal, Cécile lived at 34 Avenue du Bois de Boulogne in the 16th arrondissement of Paris before their marriage, later known as the Hôtel Blumenthal-Montmorency (designed by French architect Henri Paul Nénot). From her marriage to Blumenthal, she had two sons, Joseph Ferdinand William Blumenthal, a diplomat, and Cecil Charles Blumenthal. (Note: Cecil Blumenthal (c. 1884–1965), who changed his surname to Blunt after Cécile married the Duke of Montmorency, was vice president of the F. Blumenthal Company. Upon his 1919 marriage to Donna Anna Letitia Pecci, only daughter of Count and Countess Camillo Pecci of Rome, Cecil was made a Count as a wedding present from Pope Benedict XV (in memory of Anna's great-uncle, Pope Leo XIII), and double-barrelled his surname to Pecci-Blunt.) Her sister, Blanche Ulman, was the wife of diplomat, and later Prime Minister of Yugoslavia, Milenko Radomar Vesnić. Upon her death in Paris on 9 April 1927, her entire American estate was inherited by her two sons from her first marriage. He did, however, inherit from her French estate. Shortly after her death, the Hôtel Blumenthal-Montmorency was sold for 8-million francs to Simón Iturri Patiño who gave it to his daughter Graziella.

=== Third marriage ===
After her death, he married Gabrielle-Ida (née Lefaivre) Grandjean (1896–1985) on 21 February 1950. The widow of industrialist Armand-Augustin-Georges Grandjean, she was a daughter of the French diplomat Alexis-Jules Lefaivre, Minister Plenipotentiary, and Isabelle de Lagotellerie, she had been born in Valparaíso, Chile. where her father was stationed.

The Duke died in Paris on 26 September 1951 at which time the dukedom of Montmorency became extinct. His widow died in 1985.

== Notes ==
French nobility
Preceded by Nicolas Raoul Adalbert de Talleyrand-Périgord	Duke of Montmorency; 1915–1951	Extinct
