= Alain de Rohan-Chabot =

Alain
- Duke of Rohan
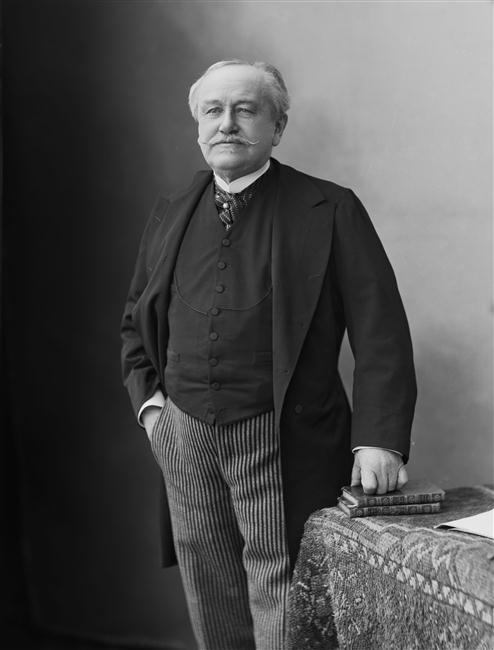
- Born: 1 December 1844; Paris, France
- Died: 6 June 1914 (aged 69); Paris, France
- Spouse: Herminie de La Brousse de Verteillac
- Issue Detail: Anne, Countess de Talleyrand-Périgord; Marie, Countess de Chambrun; Josselin de Rohan Chabot, Duke of Rohan; Françoise, Duchess of Caraman; Jehan de Rohan Chabot
Names
- Alain Charles Louis de Rohan-Chabot
- House: Rohan-Chabot
- Father: Charles Louis Josselin de Rohan-Chabot
- Mother: Octavie Rouillé de Boissy

Alain Charles Louis de Rohan-Chabot (French: [alɛ̃ də ʁɔɑ̃ ʃabo]; 1 December 1844 – 6 June 1914), Prince of Léon, 11th Duke of Rohan, deputy of Morbihan.

== Early life ==
Rohan-Chabot was born on 1 December 1844 in Paris. He was the son of Charles Louis Josselin de Rohan-Chabot (1819–1893), 10th Duke of Rohan, and Octavie Rouillé de Boissy (1824–1866). His sister, Marie-Joséphine de Rohan-Chabot, was the wife of Odet de Montault, Viscount of Montault, and, after his death, Count Arthur de Rougé.

His paternal grandparents were Anne-Louis Fernand de Rohan-Chabot, 9th Duke of Rohan, Peer of France, Maréchal de camp, aide de camp of the Duke of Berry, Squire of the Duke of Bordeaux, and the former Joséphine Françoise de Gontaut-Biron de Saint-Blancard (a daughter of Lt.-Gen. Charles Michel de Gontaut, Viscount of Gontaut-Biron-Saint-Blancard). His maternal grandparents were Hilaire-Etienne-Octave Rouillé, Marquis of Boissy, and Amélie-Charlotte-Julie de Musnier de Folleville.

== Career ==
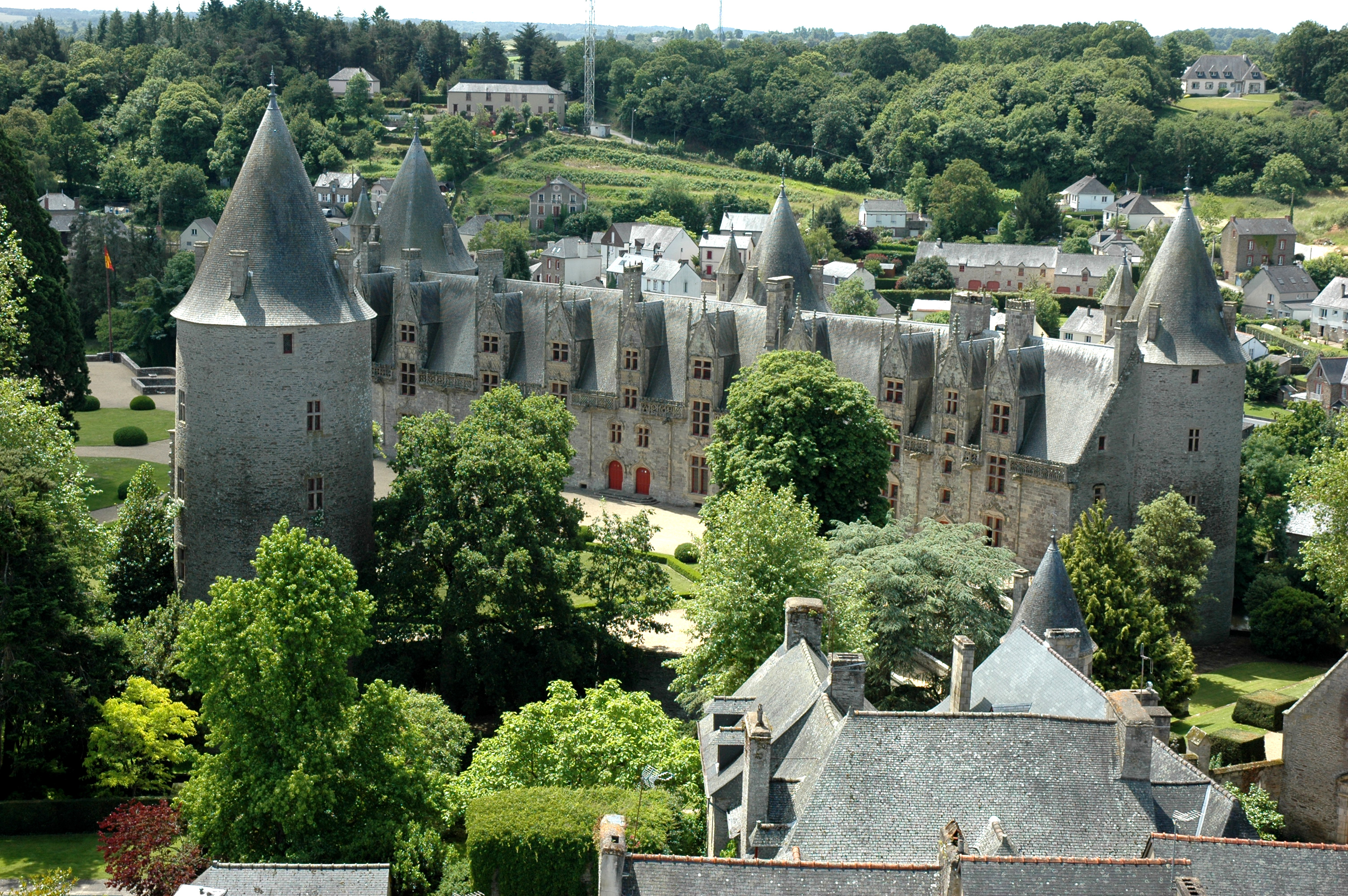
Château de Josselin in Morbihan

The Prince of Léon was a Royalist Deputy to the National Assembly for the Ploermell division of Morbihan and a member of the Departmental council.

Upon his father's death in 1893, he became the 11th Duke of Rohan.

== Personal life ==
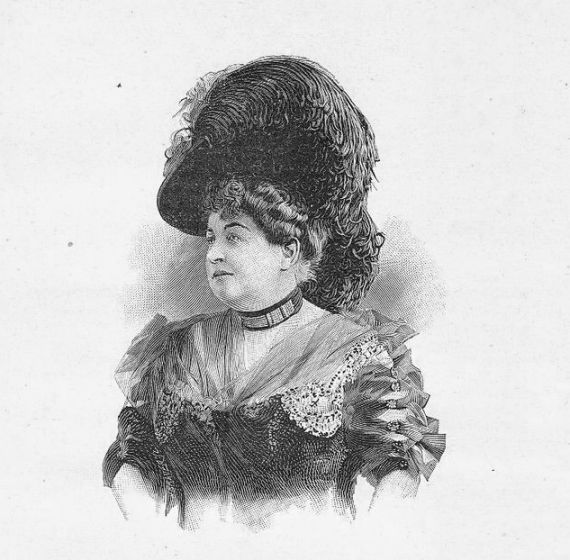
Lithograph of his wife, Herminie de La Brousse de Verteillac

On 26 June 1872, he married Marie Marguerite Henriette Antoinette Amable Herminie de La Brousse de Verteillac (1853–1926), poetess, daughter of Charles César Augustin de La Brousse de Verteillac, Baron de La Tour Blanche, and his second wife, Marie Henriette de Leuze. She was also a granddaughter of François Gabriel Thibault de La Brousse, Marquis de Verteillac. Together, they were the parents of five children:

- Marie-Joséphine-Anne de Rohan-Chabot (1873–1903), who married Count Louis de Talleyrand-Périgord (grandson of Louis de Talleyrand-Périgord and nephew of Boson de Talleyrand-Périgord), in 1891.
- Marie-Augustine de Rohan-Chabot (1876–1951), who married Prince Lucien Napoléon Murat, a son of Prince Achille Murat and Princess Salomé Dadiani, in 1897. After his death in 1933, she married Count Charles de Chambrun in 1934.
- Josselin de Rohan Chabot (1879–1916), 12th Duke of Rohan who was killed during World War I; he married Marguerite-Marie de Rohan-Chabot, a daughter of Auguste de Rohan-Chabot, in 1906.
- Françoise de Rohan Chabot (1881–1957), who married Charles de Riquet, Duke of Caraman, in 1900.
- Jehan de Rohan Chabot (1884–1968), who Anne de Talhouët-Roy in 1906.

They lived at the Hôtel de Verteillac (renamed Hôtel de Rohan), 35 boulevard des Invalides in Paris, the Château de Josselin in Morbihan, and the Chalet des Fées in Pontaillac, built by his wife's father, the Marquis de Verteillac, on the Défé estate he had acquired in 1865.

The Duke died in Paris on 6 June 1914. His widow died in the 7th arrondissement of Paris in 1926.
