= Carmen Aguado, Duchesse de Montmorency =

French noblewoman (1847–1880)

Carmen Aguado
- Duchess of Montmorency
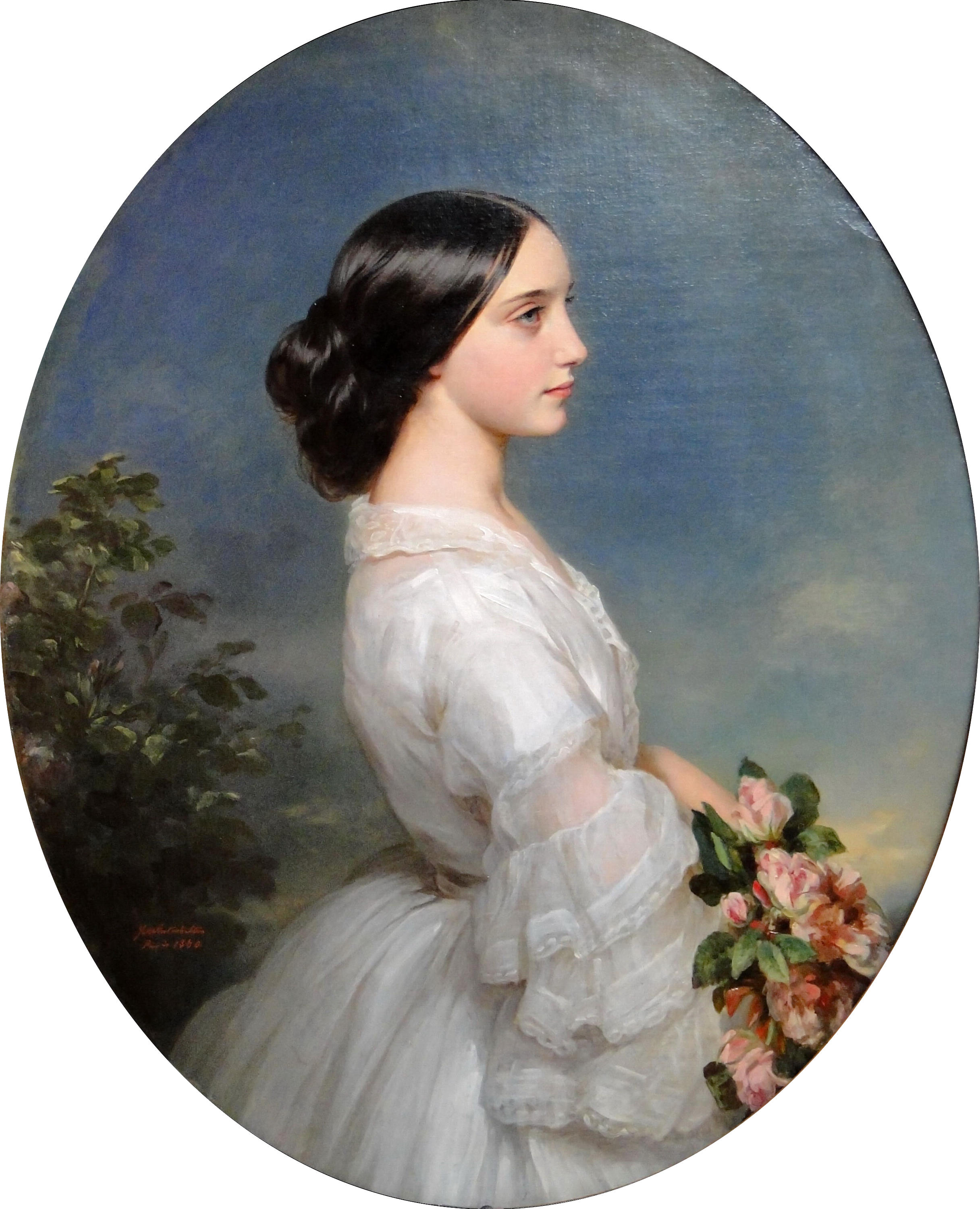
- Portrait by Franz Xaver Winterhalter, 1860
- Born: Carmen-Ida-Marie; 28 June 1847; Île-de-France, Paris, France
- Died: 26 November 1880 (aged 33); Arcachon, Gironde, Nouvelle-Aquitaine, France
- Noble family: Aguado
- Spouse: Adalbert de Talleyrand Périgord, Duc de Montmorency (m. 1866)
- Issue: Napoléon Louis Eugène Alexandre Anne Emmanuel de Talleyrand-Périgord
- Father: Alexandre Aguado, II Marqués de las Marismas del Guadalquivir
- Mother: Claire Emilie MacDonnel

Carmen Aguado, Duchesse de Montmorency (née Carmen-Ida-Marie; 28 June 1847 – 26 November 1880) was the only daughter of Alexandre Aguado Moreno and lady-in-waiting Claire Emilie MacDonnel. By marriage to Adalbert de Talleyrand Périgord, Duc de Montmorency, she was the Duchess of Montmorency. Carmen was the subject of a portrait by Franz Xaver Winterhalter.

== Early life ==
Born on 28 June 1847, Carmen-Ida-Marie Aguado was the daughter of Alexandre Aguado and Claire Emilie MacDonnel. Claire was a lady-in-waiting to Eugénie de Montijo, and Alexandre was a patient at a mental asylum. Carmen was their third and last child.

== Personal life ==
On 2 June 1866, Carmen married Adalbert de Talleyrand-Périgord (1837 – 1915) and henceforth became Duchesse de Montmorency. Their marriage was short-lived, though Carmen was able to give birth to one child:

- Napoléon Louis Eugène Alexandre Anne Emmanuel de Talleyrand-Périgord (1867–1951); who became the 8th Duke of Montmorency.

Carmen died on 26 November 1880, at the age of 33. Her death was most likely the effects of tuberculosis.

=== Portrait ===
In 1860, Carmen was the model for prominent artist Franz Xaver Winterhalter.
