= La Tour-Blanche-Cercles =

- Commune
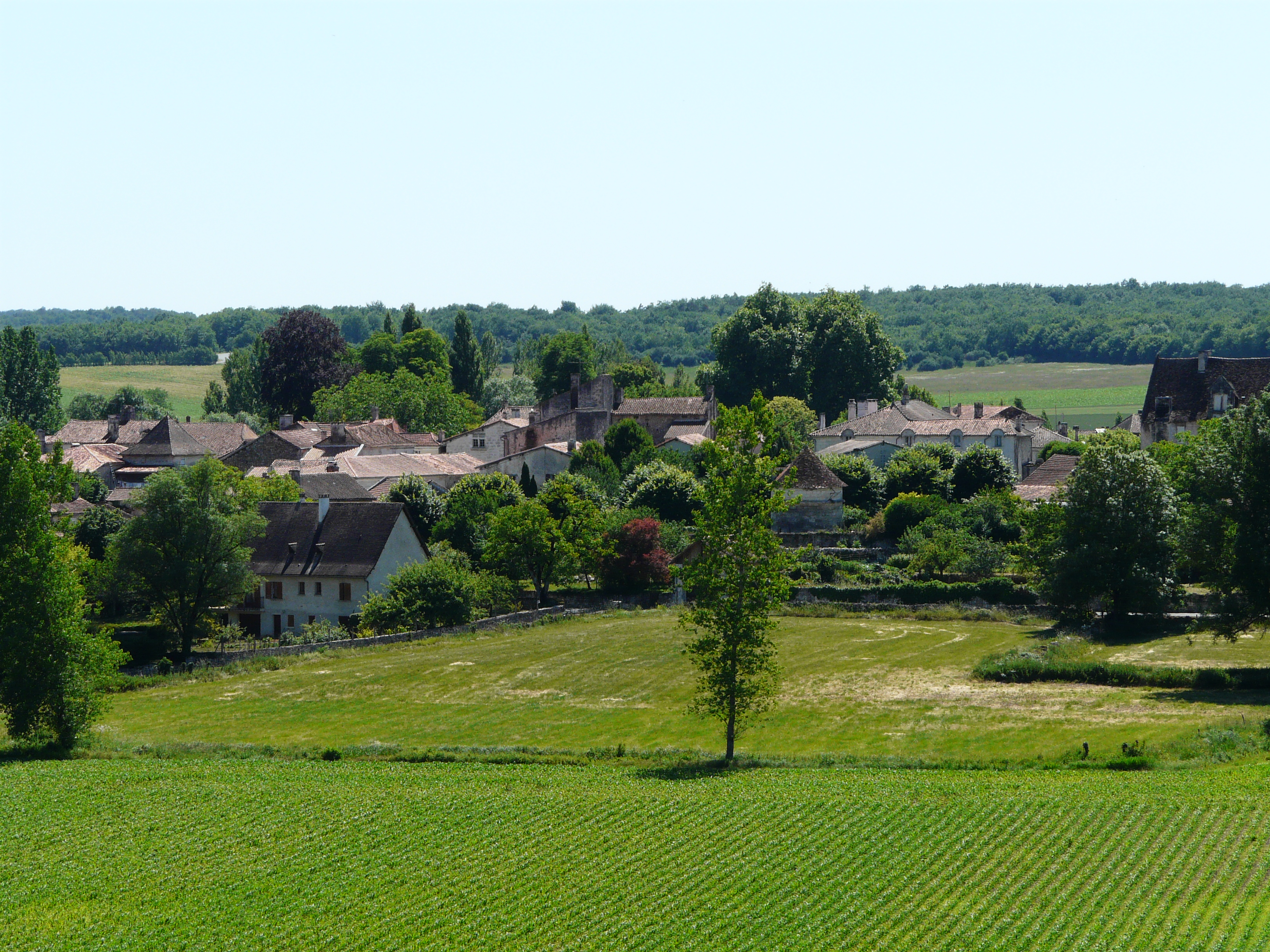
- A general view of La Tour-Blanche
- Location of La Tour-Blanche-Cercles
- Location within France Location within Nouvelle-Aquitaine
- Coordinates: 45°21′58″N 0°26′46″E
- Country: France
- Region: Nouvelle-Aquitaine
- Department: Dordogne
- Arrondissement: Périgueux
- Canton: Ribérac
- Intercommunality: Périgord Ribéracois

Government
  - Mayor (2020–2026): Daniel Bonnefond
- Area^{1}: 23.18 km^{2} (8.95 sq mi)
- Population (2023): 549
  - Density: 23.7/km^{2} (61.3/sq mi)
- Time zone: UTC+01:00 (CET)
  - Summer (DST): UTC+02:00 (CEST)
- INSEE/Postal code: 24554 /24320
- ^{1} French Land Register data, which excludes lakes, ponds, glaciers > 1 km^{2} (0.386 sq mi or 247 acres) and river estuaries.

La Tour-Blanche-Cercles (French pronunciation: [la tuʁ blɑ̃ʃ sɛʁkl]; Occitan: La Tor Blancha e Cercle) is a commune in the department of Dordogne, southwestern France. The municipality was established on 1 January 2017 by merger of the former communes of La Tour-Blanche (the seat) and Cercles.

== See also ==
- Communes of the Dordogne department
