= Duke of Montmorency =

Ducal title in France

Dukedom of Montmorency
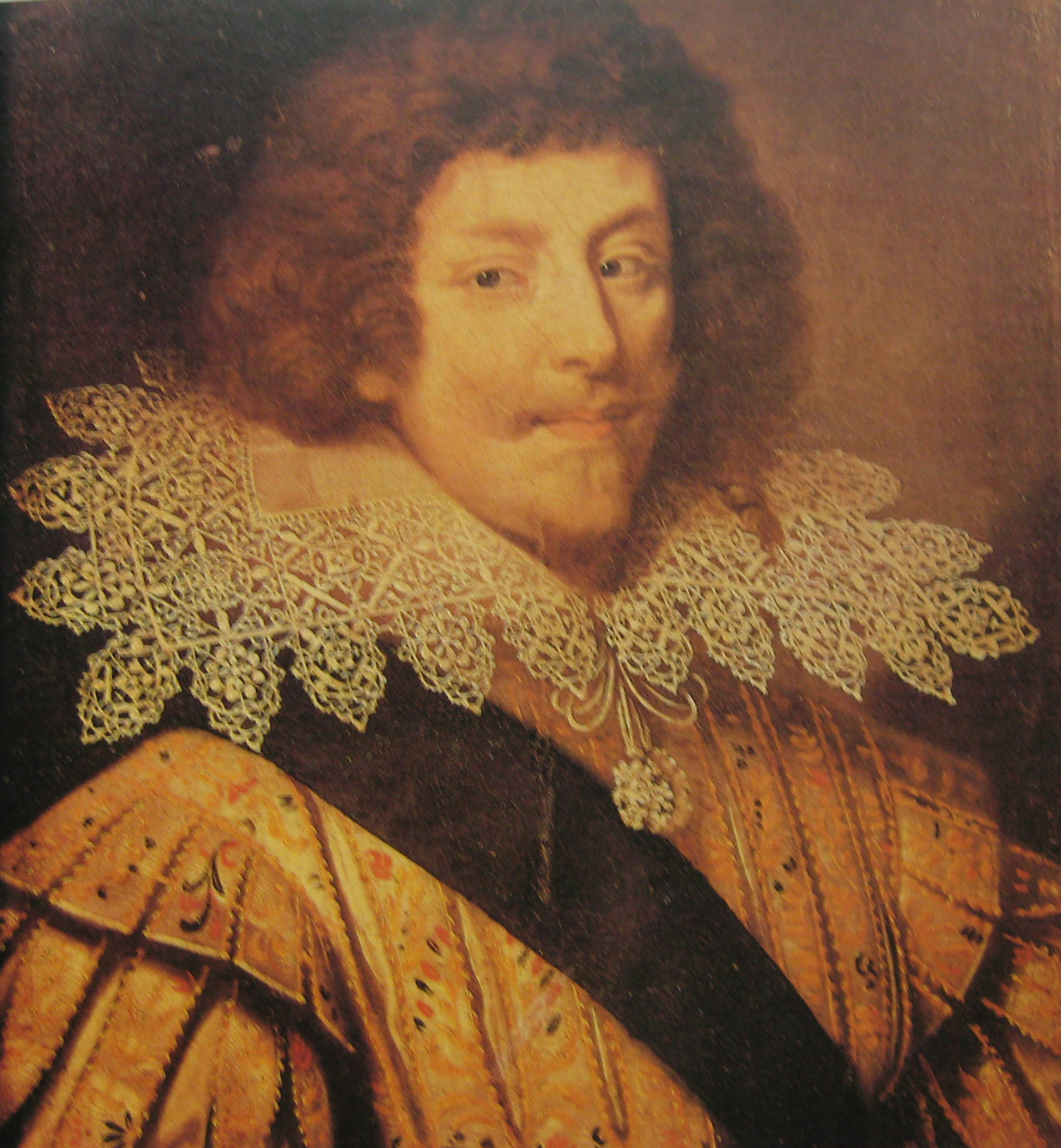
- Portrait of Henri II, Duke of Montmorency
- Creation date: 1551
- Creation: First
- Peerage: France
- First holder: Anne de Montmorency
- Last holder: Henri II de Montmorency
- Extinction date: 1951

Duke of Montmorency was a title of French nobility that was created several times for members of the Montmorency family, who were lords of Montmorency, near Paris.

== History ==
The first creation was in 1551 for Anne de Montmorency, Constable of France. This title was forfeited by his grandson, Henri II de Montmorency, who was executed for treason in 1632.

The dukedom was recreated in 1633 for his sister Charlotte-Marguerite de Montmorency and her husband, the Prince of Condé. This title was renamed as Duke of Enghien in 1689.

At that point, the Montmorency name was transferred to the dukedom of Beaufort (second creation), which had been conferred in 1688 on Charles François Frédéric de Montmorency-Luxembourg, Prince de Tingry. This new dukedom of Montmorency was authorised to pass through the female line to the branch of Montmorency-Fosseux in 1767, but the line became extinct in 1862.

However, Emperor Napoleon III extended the title of Duke of Montmorency in 1864 to Nicolas Raoul Adalbert de Talleyrand-Périgord, second son of the 3rd Duke of Talleyrand by his wife Anne Louise Charlotte de Montmorency, who was a sister of the 6th Duke of Montmorency. His male line came to an end in 1951, when the dukedom of Montmorency again became extinct.

== Dukes of Montmorency – first creation (1551) ==
1. 1551-1567 : Anne, Duke of Montmorency (1493–1567)
2. 1567-1579 : François, Duke of Montmorency (1530–1579), son of
3. 1579-1614 : Henri I, Duke of Montmorency (1534–1614), brother of
4. 1614-1632 : Henri II, Duke of Montmorency (1595–1632), son of

The title was forfeited by the last duke upon execution, and returned to the royal domain.

== Dukes of Montmorency – second creation (1633) ==
1. 1633-1646 : Henri I, Duke of Montmorency (1588–1646), brother-in-law
2. 1646-1686 : Louis, Duke of Montmorency (1643–1686), son of
3. 1686-1689 : Henri II, Duke of Montmorency (1643–1709), son of

The title of Duke of Montmorency was changed to Duke of Enghien in 1689.

1. 1689-1709 : Henri I, Duke of Enghien (1643–1709)
2. 1709-1710 : Louis I, Duke of Enghien (1668–1710)
3. 1710-1740 : Louis II Henri, Duke of Enghien (1692–1740)
4. 1740-1818 : Louis III Joseph, Duke of Enghien (1736–1818)
5. 1818-1830 : Louis IV Henri, Duke of Enghien (1756–1830)

On the death of the last duke in 1830, the title passed to Louis Philippe III, Duke of Orléans, a great-great-grandson of Louis I, Duke of Enghien through the female line. He had become King of the French as Louis Philippe I a month earlier.

== Dukes of Montmorency – third creation (1689) ==
The title of Duke of Beaufort was changed to Duke of Montmorency in 1689.

1. 1688-1726 : Charles I, Duke of Montmorency (1662–1726)
2. 1726-1730 : Charles II, Duke of Montmorency (1702–1764), son of
3. 1730-1761 : Anne I Francis, Duke of Montmorency (1735–1761), son of
4. 1761-1799 : Charlotte, Duchess of Montmorency (1752–1829), daughter of, married 1767
5. 1767-1799 : Anne II Leon, Duke of Montmorency (1731–1799)
6. 1799-1846 : Anne III Charles, Duke of Montmorency (1768–1846), son of
7. 1846-1862 : Anne IV Louis, Duke of Montmorency (1790–1862), son of
8. 1864-1915 : Nicolas, Duke of Montmorency (1837–1915), nephew of, title extended to him and his issue in 1864
9. 1915-1951 : Napoleon, Duke of Montmorency (1867–1951)

On the death of the last duke in 1951, the title became extinct.
