= Cercles =

Commune in Dordogne, France

- Part of La Tour-Blanche-Cercles
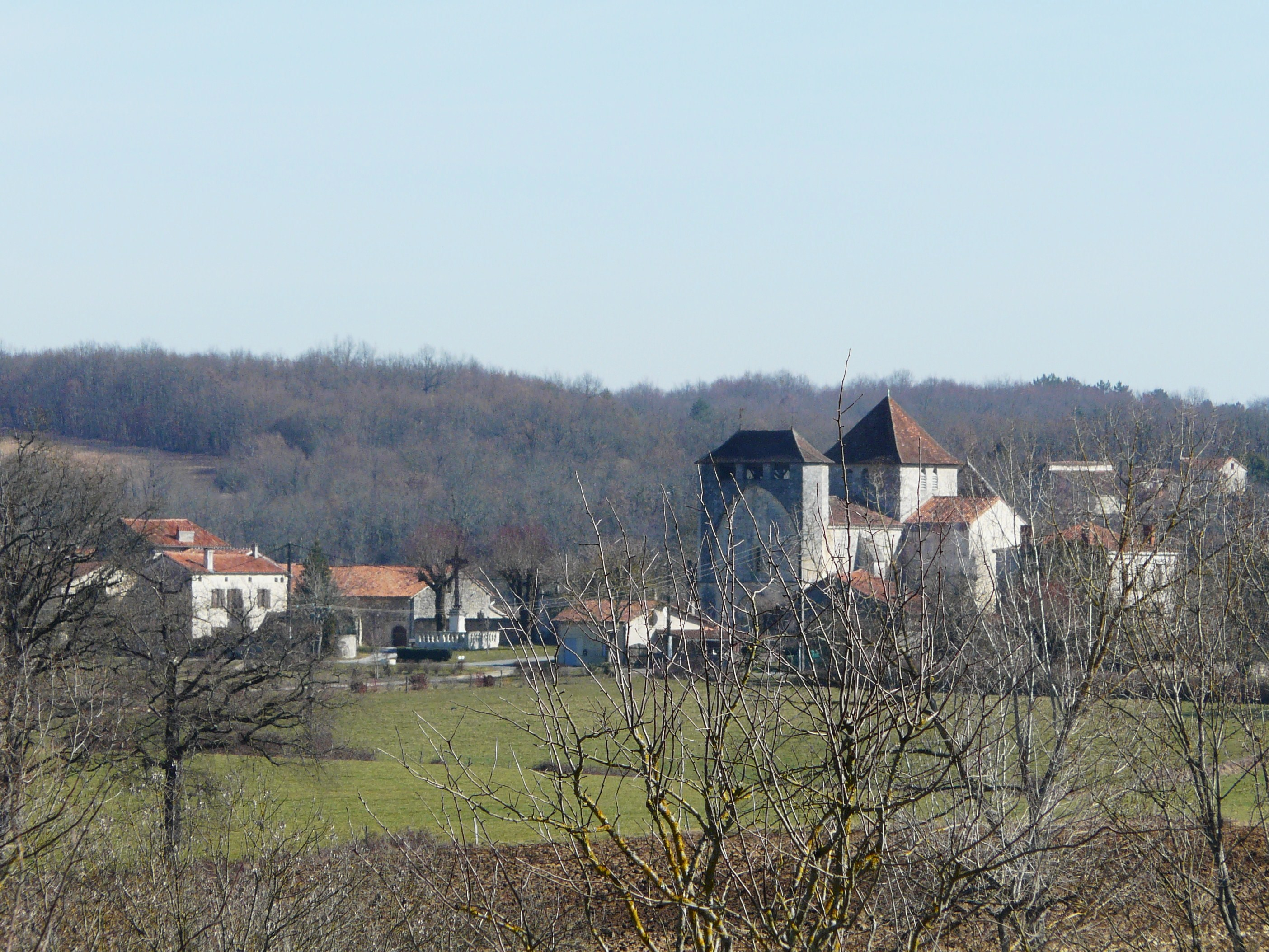
- Location of Cercles
- Location within France Location within Nouvelle-Aquitaine
- Coordinates: 45°21′55″N 0°27′45″E
- Country: France
- Region: Nouvelle-Aquitaine
- Department: Dordogne
- Arrondissement: Périgueux
- Canton: Ribérac
- Commune: La Tour-Blanche-Cercles
- Area^{1}: 15.07 km^{2} (5.82 sq mi)
- Elevation: 155 m (509 ft)
- Highest elevation: 211 m (692 ft)
- Lowest elevation: 114 m (374 ft)
- Population (2023): 184
  - Density: 12.2/km^{2} (31.6/sq mi)
- Time zone: UTC+01:00 (CET)
  - Summer (DST): UTC+02:00 (CEST)
- Postal code: 24320
- ^{1} French Land Register data, which excludes lakes, ponds, glaciers > 1 km^{2} (0.386 sq mi or 247 acres) and river estuaries.

Cercles (French pronunciation: [sɛʁkl]; Occitan: Cercle) is a former commune in the Dordogne department in Nouvelle-Aquitaine in southwestern France. On 1 January 2017, it was merged into the new commune La Tour-Blanche-Cercles.

== History ==
From 1825 to 1877, the nearby town of La Chapelle-Montabourlet was incorporated into Cercles.

== See also ==
- Communes of the Dordogne department
