= Bauffremont =

House of Bauffremont
- Noble family
- Country: France
- Titles: Prince of the Holy Roman Empire; Prince-Duke of Bauffremont; Prince of Carency; Prince of Courtenay; Prince of Marnay; Prince of Listenois; Duke of Pont de Vaux; Marquess of Listenois; Marquess of Marnay; Count of Pont de Vaux; Viscount of Marigny; Viscount of Salins; Lord of Charny
- Motto: God helps the first Christian.

The House of Bauffremont is the name of a French princely family which derived its name from a village in the Vosges, outside of Neufchâteau, now spelt Beaufremont. The family traces itself to Liébaud, sire de Bauffremont, in 1090. They are descended from the female line of the House of Courtenay.

== History ==
In consequence of an alliance with the House of Vergy, the Bauffremonts established themselves in Burgundy and Franche-Comté. In 1448 Pierre de Bauffremont, lord of Charny, married Marie, a legitimized daughter of Philip the Good, duke of Burgundy. In 1527 the family acquired by marriage the properties of the Vienne-Listenois family.

Nicolas de Bauffremont, his son Claude, and his grandson Henri, all played important parts in the states-general of 1576, 1588 and 1614, and their speeches have been published.

On 8 June 1757 Louis de Bauffremont (1712–1769) was made a Prince of the Holy Roman Empire (inheritable by all male-line descendants); on 21 August and 27 September this title was recognised in France.

The last male member of the French Courtenays committed suicide in 1727. However his sister married Louis de Bauffremont, and their descendants assumed the dubious title of Prince de Courtenay, which they bear to this day.

Alexandre Emmanuel Louis de Bauffremont - Courtenay (1773–1833), son of Louis served under the Bourbons. He fled France during the French Revolution and settled in the United States. He later returned to France and was made a Count of the French Empire by Emperor Napoleon Bonaparte. Louis XVIII made him a peer of France in 1817, and duke in 1818.

The head of the house, Jacques de Bauffremont, 8th Duke of Bauffremont, 10th Prince of Marnay (1922–2020), was the president of the Institut de la Maison de Bourbon, the organisation which supports the claims of Prince Louis, Duke of Anjou to the throne of France. His sister Princess Claude de Bauffremont-Courtenay was honorary superintendent of the houses of education of the Legion of Honour.

The head of the house uses the following titles: Prince-Duc de Bauffremont, Prince de Courtenay et de Carency, Prince et Marquis de Listenois et de Marnay, Comte et Duc de Pont de Vaux, Vicomte de Marigny et de Salins, Cousin du Roi. The cadet members of the house use the titles, Prince de Bauffremont, Prince de Marnay.

Two members of the family have been members of the Order of the Golden Fleece: Louis Bénigne, Marquis of Bauffremont, Prince of Listenois (1684–1755) in 1711 and Charles Roger, Prince of Bauffremont-Listenois (1713–1795) in 1789.

== See also ==
- Duke of Bauffremont
