= Jacques de Bauffremont =

French prince (1922–2020)

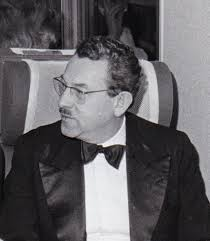
- Jacques de Bauffremont
- Born: 6 February 1922; Paris, France
- Died: 9 January 2020 (aged 97); Versailles, France
- Occupation: Prince

Jacques de Bauffremont, 8th Duke of Bauffremont and 10th Prince of Marnay (6 February 1922 – 9 January 2020) was a French prince.

de Bauffremont was elected President of the Institut de la maison de Bourbon in 1976, a position which he held until 2009. He was succeeded by his son, Charles-Emmanuel de Bauffremont.
