= Anne Charles François de Montmorency =

5th Duke of Montmorency

Charles de Montmorency
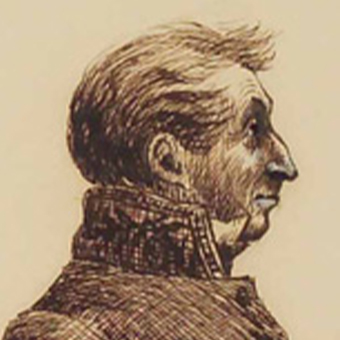

General Councilor of Eure-et-Loir
- In office 1833–1836
- Preceded by: Office created
- Succeeded by: Armand de Tarragon

Personal details
- Born: 13 July 1768 Hôtel de Montmorency, Paris, France
- Died: 25 May 1846 (aged 77) Paris, France
- Spouse: Anne Louise Caroline Goyon de Matignon (m. 1788; died 1846)
- Awards: Legion of Honour; Order of Saint Louis

Military service
- Allegiance: Kingdom of France
- Branch/service: Armée des Émigrés
- Years of service: 1758
- Battles/wars: French Revolutionary Wars

Anne Charles François de Montmorency, 5th Duke of Montmorency (13 July 1768 – 25 May 1846) was a French soldier and politician.

== Early life ==
Montmorency was born at the Hôtel de Montmorency at 10 rue Saint-Marc in Paris on 13 July 1768. He was the eldest son of Anne Léon, Duke of Montmorency (1731–1799) and Charlotte-Françoise de Montmorency-Luxembourg, suo jure 4th Duchess of Montmorency (1745–1763). Montmorency had three brothers and two sisters: Christian (Marquis of Seignelay who was known as the Prince of Montmorency-Tancarville), Élisabeth (wife of Alexandre Louis Auguste de Rohan-Chabot), Thibaut, Pulchérie (wife of Victor Louis Victurnien de Rochechouar, Marquis de Mortemart), and Louis.

His maternal grandparents were Anne-François de Montmorency-Luxembourg, 3rd Duke of Montmorency (son of Charles II François Frédéric de Montmorency-Luxembourg).

== Career ==
He joined the French Army in 1785 of the Colonel-Général Dragoon Régiment. During the French Revolution, he emigrated but returned to France as soon as Napoleon Bonaparte allowed emigres to return from exile. In 1813, he was appointed to the command of the National Guard at Eure-et-Loir. In 1814, during the campaign in north-east France, the Emperor attached him to the staff of the National Guard of Paris, as one of the four Aides-Majors General, under the orders of Marshal Bon-Adrien Jeannot de Moncey. After Moncey was recalled by the Emperor and the three other Majors General received other assignments, he alone had command and was charged with defending the capital against foreign armies.

He succeeded his father as the 6th Duke of Montmorency in 1799. His father had assumed the title jure uxoris in 1767 following his marriage to his mother, Charlotte-Françoise.

From 1815 on, the Duke of Montmorency divided his life between the city and the countryside. He was a member of the Departmental Council of Eure-et-Loir from 1822 to 1836.

== Personal life ==
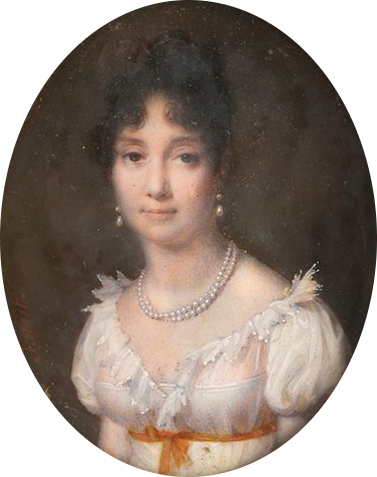
Portrait of his wife, Anne-Louise-Caroline, by Daniel Saint

On 2 June 1788, he married Anne Louise Caroline Goyon de Matignon, Countess de Gacé (1774–1846), daughter of Louis Charles Auguste Goyon de Matignon, Count de Gacé, and Angélique-Marie Élisabeth Émilie Le Tonnelier de Breteuil (a daughter of French diplomat Louis Auguste Le Tonnelier, Baron de Breteuil). Together, they had three children:

- Anne Louis Raoul Victor de Montmorency, 5th Duke of Montmorency (1790–1862), who married Euphémie Théodora Valentine de Harchies.
- Anne Élisabeth Laurence de Montmorency (1802–1860), who married Théodore, Prince of Bauffremont, son of Alexandre de Bauffremont.
- Anne Louise Charlotte Alix de Montmorency (1810–1858), who married Napoléon Louis de Talleyrand-Périgord, 3rd Duke of Talleyrand, de jure 3rd Duke of Dino.

The Duke died in 1846 and was succeeded as the 5th Duke of Montmorency by his only son, Anne Louis Raoul Victor de Montmorency. As he died without issue in 1862, the dukedom passed to his grandson, Nicolas Raoul Adalbert de Talleyrand-Périgord, the youngest son of his youngest daughter, Anne Louise Charlotte Alix.

French nobility
Preceded by Anne Léon de Montmorency	Duke of Montmorency; 1799–1846	Succeeded by Anne Louis Raoul Victor de Montmorency
