= Léoville L'Homme =

Mauritian poet, literary critic, journalist and newspaper editor

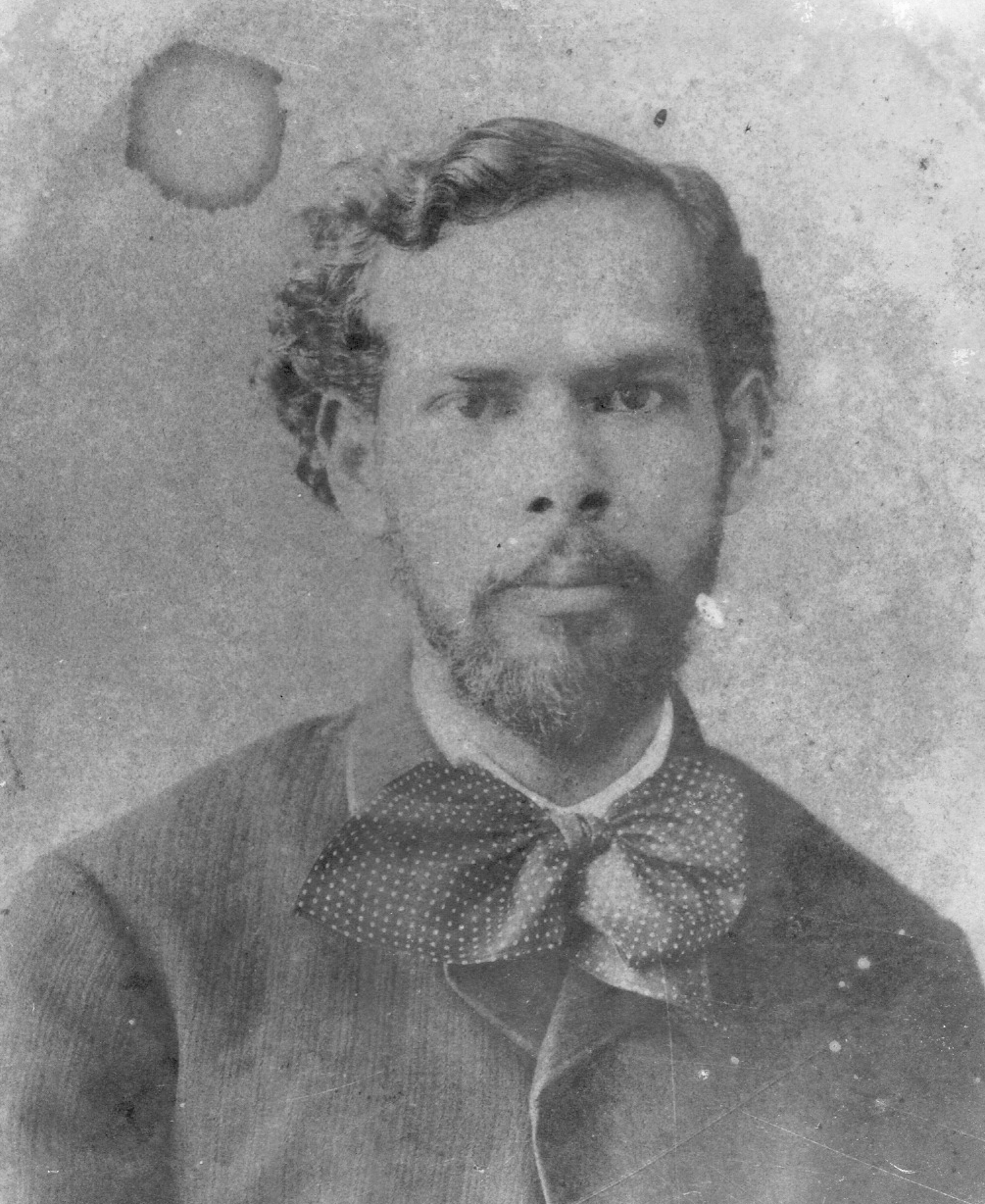
- L'Homme at age 22
- Born: Pierre Léoville Arthur L'Homme; 7 April 1857; Port Louis, Mauritius
- Died: 26 May 1928 (aged 71); Rose Hill, Mauritius
- Occupations: Poet, literary critic, journalist, newspaper editor, librarian
- Spouse: Eva Dupuy
- Children: 5

Pierre Léoville Arthur L'Homme (1857–1928) was a Mauritian poet, literary critic, journalist, newspaper editor and librarian who wrote in French. He is considered the foremost Mauritian poet of the late nineteenth century and the first Mauritian writer to produce an extensive body of work and to establish an overseas literary reputation.

== Journalistic work ==
The son of a journalist, L'Homme turned to journalism himself. At age 24 he became editor at the liberal newspaper La Sentinelle de Maurice, a voice of the mixed-race middle class. He left this paper due to a political disagreement. With Pierre Charles he founded the French-language and English-language newspaper Le Droit, which covered political, literary, historical and commercial matters. It appeared from 1885 to 1887, when L'Homme incorporated it into his new title, La Presse Nouvelle (1887-1888). He was the first editor of the daily La Défense (1897-1900). In 1908 he founded the fortnightly Mauritiana, which had biographical, historical and literary content in French and ran until 1916. As a journalist he argued in favour of constitutional reforms. After his journalistic work, he became municipal librarian in Port Louis in 1903.

== Literary work ==
L'Homme's literary work is strongly appreciative of France (which he never visited) and the French language. He stated that "La langue plus que le sang est la manifestation d'une nationalité" ("A nationality expresses itself not so much through blood as through a language") and argued that the French language was what had preserved a strong bond between (British-ruled) Mauritius and France. The staging of his one-acter Le dernier tribut in Port Louis in 1883 was the first staging of a piece by a Mauritian writer.

In his poetry he went beyond the established Romantic style, being strongly influenced by the French poet Leconte de Lisle and the literary movement called Parnassianism, which advocated l'art pour l'art. Recurring images in his work include lilies, stars, the sun, the moon, lips, the mouth and kisses, which "lend to his poetry the brightness of the tropical sky and a hint of spirituality". He took his subjects from the Bible, Hinduism, classical antiquity ("the gods and above all the goddesses of Olympus") and his native island, and "dedicated in his poetry a veritable cult to the Woman".

Contributing to such periodicals as the Revue historique & littéraire de l'Île Maurice, L'Essor, Le Voleur Mauricien, Les Roses de Noël and Le Soleil de Juillet, L'Homme critiqued the works of many writers and poets of his time, encouraging others in their literary careers. He also published articles and stories under the pen name Léon Lauret.

== Private life and legacy ==
Léoville L'Homme, the son of Pierre L'Homme and Eliza Denny, was of European, African and Indian descent. He grew up in Port Louis, in the waterfront area Les Salines, and married Jeanne Eva Dupuy in Plaines Wilhems on 21 May 1885. They had two sons, Maurice and France, and three daughters, Jeanne, Edith and Louise. He was buried in Le Cimetière de L'Ouest, Port Louis.

L'Homme is considered "an emblematic figure of Mauritian literature" whose "contribution to its development is remarkable both in quality and volume." As an admired poet, "his input has left a deep lasting impression". Various streets in Mauritius bear his name, and a bronze bust of the poet to whom a muse hands a laurel wreath was placed in the Jardin de la Compagnie in the capital in 1931.

== Publications ==
- Le Ramayana (Port Louis, B. Bucktowarsingh, 50 p., date unknown)
- Poèmes païens et bibliques (1877, reissued by Nouv. Imp. Dupuy, 94 p., in 1887)
- Pages en vers (1881, Gen. Steam Printing Cy., 38 p., 2nd ed. 1905 as Pages en vers. Edition nouvelle revue et augmentée)
- Le dernier tribut, drame en un acte, en vers représenté sur le théâtre de Port-Louis le 27 août 1883 (1883, General Steam Printing Cy., 42 p.)
- Les Etoiles (Port Louis, 1883, Imprimerie du Mercantile Record, 14 p.)
- Victor Hugo. Mai 1885 (Port Louis, 1886, Imprimerie du Mercantile Record Company, 12 p.)
- Le statuaire Prosper d'Epinay (1890, Imp. de The Merchants and Planters Gazette, 53 p.)
- Les larmes de Sainte Scholastique. Poème (1892, Imp. du Journal de Maurice, 14 p.)
- La guerre de Crète, 1897. Ode à la Grèce (1897, Engelbrecht & Cie, 14 p.)
- Les roses de la Reine. Hommage à l'Ile Maurice (1897, The Planters Gazette, 16 p.)
- Poésies diverses : Les larmes de Ste Scholastique. Les fées. La fleur des eaux. Berceuse. Soir d'Octobre (1897, Imp. de The Planters and Commercial Gazette, 16 p.)
- Mahé de La Bourdonnais. Documents réunis par le comité du bi-centenaire de La Bourdonnais, 11 février 1899. Avec des annotations par le Comité des Souvenirs Historiques (Port Louis, 1899, as editor, published by E. Pezzani)
- Jeanne d'Arc au sacre. Poésie, inspirée par la statue de Jeanne d'Arc, due au ciseau de Prosper d'Epinay (1901)
- Rémy Ollier. Extrait de la Revue de Port-Louis, No. 1, 15 Déc. 1904 (1904, Imp. Nouvelle)
- La maison déserte. Les Lettres françaises à l'île Maurice de 1885 à 1910. Introduction du Prince de Bauffremont (Paris, 1914, Editions de la Pensée de France)
- Les poèmes à forme fixe. XIIe Conférence sur la littérature française, suivie de quelques pages sur Sir William Newton comme amateur de lettres (1916, The General Printing and Stationery Cy. Ltd., 49 p.)
- La bague perdue (1918, The General Printing and Stationery Cy. Ltd., 38 p.)
- Poèmes épars (Paris, 1921, Jouve & Cie., 91 p.)
- Poésies et poèmes (1926, The General Printing and Stationery Cy. Ltd., 139 p., reissued in 1928)

=== About Léoville L'Homme ===
- Prince M. de Bauffremont, Un poète de l'Ile Maurice : Léoville L'Homme (Paris, 1913)
- Selmour Ahnee, Léoville L'Homme. Quelques aspects de son caractère et de son talent (1951, The Mauritius Printing Cy. Ltd., 27 p.)
