= Herminie de La Brousse de Verteillac =

French poet

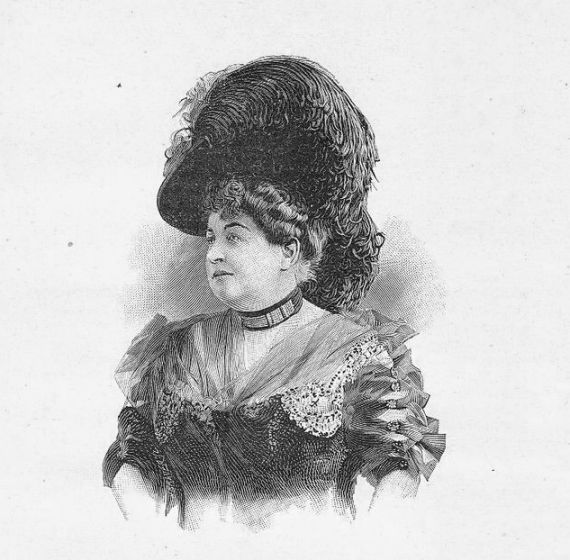
- Born: July 28, 1853; Paris, French Second Empire
- Died: April 13, 1926 (aged 72); 7th arrondissement of Paris, French Third Republic
- Awards: Legion of Honour; Medal of French Gratitude

Herminie de La Brousse de Verteillac, (July 28, 1853, Paris, France – April 13, 1926, 7th arrondissement of Paris), also called Herminie de Rohan-Chabot was a French poet, Princesse de Léon (1872–1893) then Duchesse de Rohan (1893–1926).

== Early life ==
Daughter of Charles César Augustin de La Brousse de Verteillac, Baron de La Tour Blanche, and his second wife, Marie Henriette de Leuze, she is the granddaughter of François Gabriel Thibault de La Brousse, Marquis de Verteillac.

== Career ==
The Princesse de Léon quickly became a world-famous personality, dividing her time between the Hôtel de Verteillac (renamed Hôtel de Rohan), 35 boulevard des Invalides in Paris, the Château de Josselin (Morbihan) and the Chalet des Fées in Pontaillac, built by her father, the Marquis de Verteillac, on the Défé estate he had acquired in 1865.

In her Paris salon, she entertained literary figures, notably Robert de Montesquiou, who dedicated one of the poems in Le Chef des odeurs suaves to her. A passionate poet, she published three successive collections: Lande fleurie (1905), Les Lucioles (1907) and Souffles d'Océan (1911). A member of the Société des poètes français, she founded a poetry prize. She gave numerous literary lectures in Paris, Brussels and the provinces. She was also a painter.

During the First World War, in which she lost her eldest son, she transformed her mansion into a military hospital and devoted herself to caring for the wounded, for which she was awarded the Légion d'honneur, the médaille de la Reconnaissance française and the médaille de la Reconnaissance italienne.

Her doll collection forms the basis of the Musée de la Poupée, opened in 1984 in the former stables of the Château de Josselin.

== Personal life ==
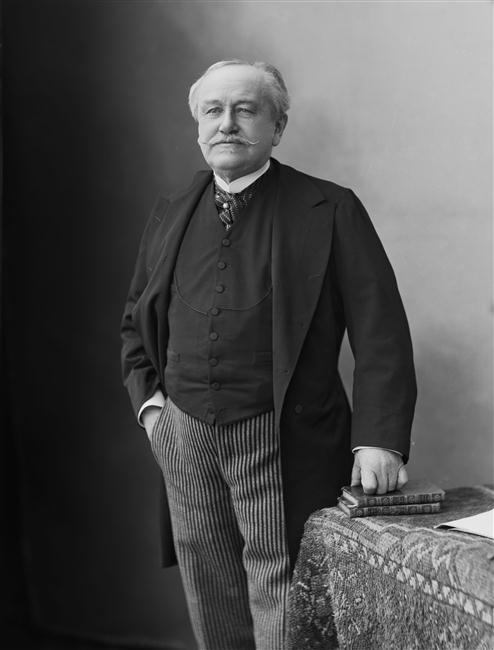
Photograph of her husband, the Duke of Rohan, 1890

On June 26, 1872, Herminie de Verteillac married Alain de Rohan-Chabot (1844–1914), Prince of Léon, who became the 11th Duke of Rohan on his father's death in 1893. They had five children:

- Marie-Joséphine-Anne de Rohan-Chabot (1873–1903), who married Count Louis de Talleyrand-Périgord (grandson of Louis de Talleyrand-Périgord and nephew of Boson de Talleyrand-Périgord), in 1891.
- Marie-Augustine de Rohan-Chabot (1876–1951), who married Prince Lucien Napoléon Murat in 1897. After his death in 1933, she married Count Charles de Chambrun in 1934.
- Josselin de Rohan Chabot (1879–1916), 12th Duke of Rohan who was killed during World War I; he married Marguerite-Marie de Rohan-Chabot, a daughter of Auguste de Rohan-Chabot, in 1906.
- Françoise de Rohan Chabot (1881–1957), who married Charles de Riquet, Duke of Caraman, in 1900.
- Jehan de Rohan Chabot (1884–1968), who Anne de Talhouët-Roy in 1906.

The Duke died in Paris on 6 June 1914. The Duchess died in the 7th arrondissement of Paris in 1926.

== Works ==
- Lande fleurie, poems, Paris, Calmann-Lévy, 184 p. (1905)
- Les Lucioles, poems, Paris, Calmann-Lévy, 199 p. (1907)
- Les Dévoilées du Caucase, travel notes, Paris, Calmann-Lévy, 386 p. (1910)
- Souffles d'Océan, poems, Paris, Calmann-Lévy, 192 p. (1911)
- Le Chant du cygne, poems, Paris, Calmann-Lévy, 195 p. (1922)

== See also ==
- House of Rohan-Chabot
- Josselin Castle
