= Anne Louis Raoul Victor de Montmorency =

6th Duke of Montmorency

Anne Louis Raoul Victor de Montmorency (14 December 1790 – 18 August 1862), 6th Duke of Montmorency, was a French aristocrat.

== Early life ==
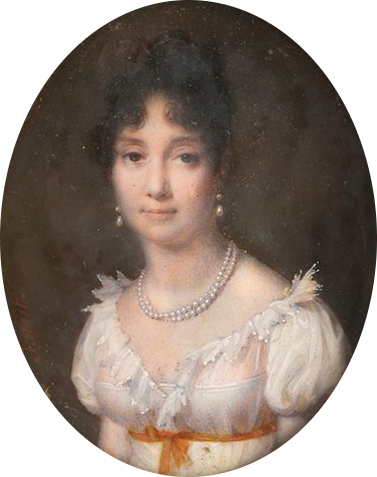
Portrait of his mother, Anne-Louise-Caroline, Duchess of Montmorency, by Daniel Saint

Montmorency was born on 14 December 1790. He was the son of Anne Charles François de Montmorency, 5th Duke of Montmorency (1768–1846), and Anne Louise Caroline de Goyon de Matignon, Countess de Gacé (1774–1846). His sisters were Anne Élisabeth Laurence de Montmorency (wife of Théodore, Prince of Bauffremont, son of Alexandre de Bauffremont) and Anne Louise Charlotte Alix de Montmorency (wife of Napoléon Louis, 3rd Duke of Talleyrand-Périgord, de jure 3rd Duke of Dino).

His paternal grandparents were Anne Léon, Duke of Montmorency and Charlotte-Françoise de Montmorency-Luxembourg, suo jure 4th Duchess of Montmorency (daughter of Anne-François de Montmorency-Luxembourg, 3rd Duke of Montmorency). His maternal grandparents were Louis Charles Auguste Goyon de Matignon, Count de Gacé, and Angélique-Marie Élisabeth Émilie Le Tonnelier de Breteuil (a daughter of French diplomat Louis Auguste Le Tonnelier, Baron de Breteuil).

== Career ==
He served as aide-de-camp to Marshal Louis-Nicolas Davout as well as chamberlain to Emperor Napoleon in 1813. From 1815 to 1820, he was aide-de-camp to the Duke of Orléans (later King Louis Philippe I).

He succeeded his father as the 6th Duke of Montmorency in 1846.

== Personal life ==
In 1821, he married Euphémie Théodore Valentine de Harchies de Vlamertinghe (1786–1858), the widow of his uncle, Thibaut de Montmorency, who died in a carriage accident at Montgeron in 1818. She was the daughter of Louis François Gabriel Joseph de Harchies de Vlaemertinghe and Hélène Gottliebe von Plettenberg.

The Duke died, without issue, on 18 August 1862. The dukedom passed to his nephew, Nicolas Raoul Adalbert de Talleyrand-Périgord, the youngest son of his sister Anne Louise Charlotte Alix de Montmorency. Her elder son, Boson de Talleyrand-Périgord, inherited the dukedom of Talleyrand.

French nobility
Preceded by Anne Charles François de Montmorency	Duke of Montmorency; 1846–1862	Succeeded by Nicolas Raoul Adalbert de Talleyrand-Périgord
