= House of Sanfelice =

Neapolitan aristocratic family of Italian nobles

Sanfelice Italian: Casa di Sanfelice
- Italian noble family
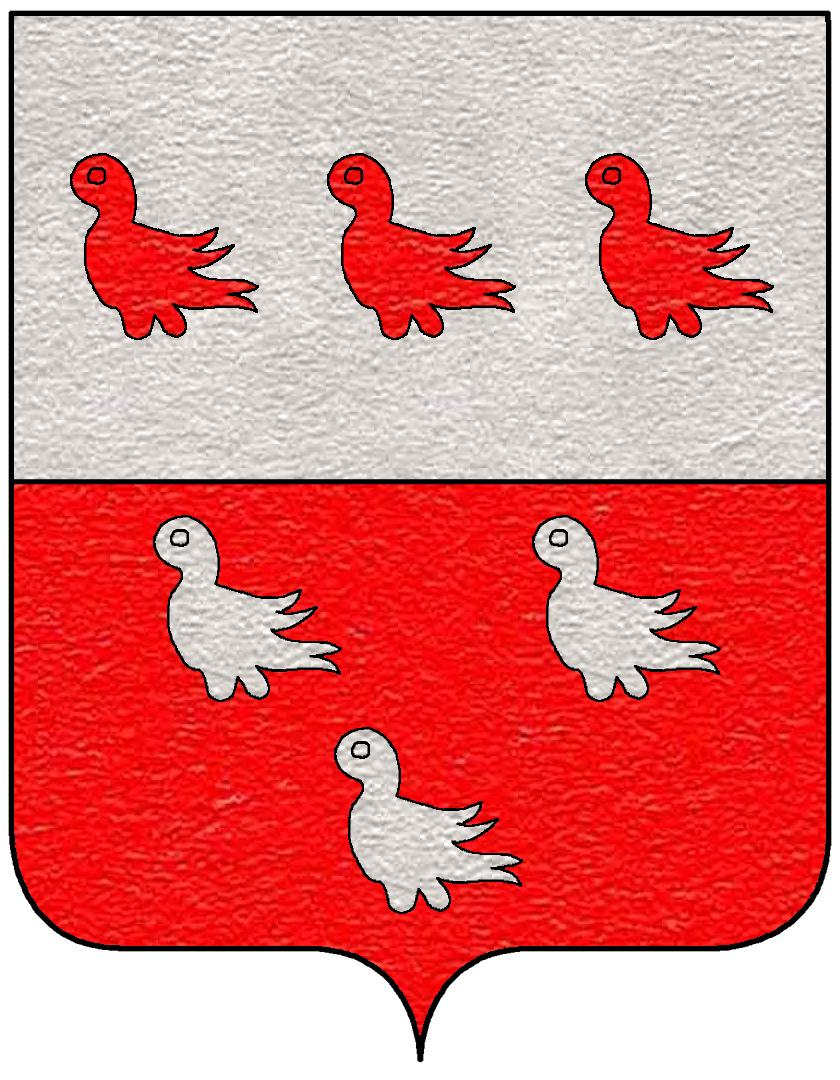
- Country: Italy Former countries: Kingdom of Naples; Two Sicilies; Kingdom of Italy
- Founded: 1080
- Founder: Pietro Sanfelice
- Titles: Prince of Monteverde; Prince of Viggiano; Duke of Rhodes; Duke of Bagnoli; Duke of Laureana Cilento; Duke of San Cyprian

Sanfelice or San Felice is the name of an old and influential Neapolitan aristocratic family of Italian nobles, holding numerous fiefs including duchies, counties, principalities and others. The family also enjoyed privileges in other cities of the Kingdom of Naples and in France.

== History ==
The origins of the family date back to the Norman era. The founder was Pietro Sanfelice, a Norman knight who came to Italy following Robert Guiscard. Pietro obtained the County of Sanfelice in Terra di Lavoro in 1080, giving rise to the Sanfelice family with his descendants. The family had Sanfelice as its first fief in 1230; then they became Counts and Marquesses of Corigliano Calabro; with the growth of their power they also acquired the County of Bagnoli del Trigno. In the 16th century they were received by the Order of Santiago of Spain and the Order of the Knights of Malta. In the 17th century they also became Dukes of Rhodes (1609), Bagnoli (1625), Laureana Cilento (1637), San Cipriano (1658), and feudal Lords of Agropoli (1660-1803) and Acquavella (1795); they also became Princes of Monteverde in 1646, and of Viggiano in 1891. In addition to these more significant fiefdoms, the Sanfelices had owned over fifty fiefdoms and held prestigious positions. In the 18th century they took part in the uprisings of the Neapolitan Republic of 1799.

== Notable members ==
- Pietro Sanfelice, founder of the family.
- Tancredi Sanfelice, son of Pietro, donated some buildings in the city of Troia to the co-cathedral of Troia in 1090.
- Tancredi Sanfelice, namesake of the previous one, took part in one of the Crusades in 1187 with 53 soldiers belonging to his fiefs.
- Pietro Sanfelice, Count of Corigliano in 1239, was part of the Comes. Emperor Frederick II, Duke of Swabia entrusted him with some prisoners captured in Lombardy.
- Giordano Sanfelice, relative of Charles I of Naples, was Justiciar of Basilicata and Vicar General on the Island of Corfu (1284).
- Pietro Sanfelice, Vicar in Terra di Lavoro and Viceroy of Calabria in 1343.
- Paride Sanfelice, Vicar in Terra di Lavoro and Lieutenant of the Chamber of Sommaria in 1392.
- Giovanni Sanfelice, born in Melfi; the Bishop of Alessano and Muro Lucano from 1405 to 1443.
- Antonio Sanfelice, Neapolitan scholar and man of letters who lived in the 16th century.
- Giovanni Tommaso Sanfelice, Governor of Perugia, Bishop of Cava de' Tirreni in 1520 and General Commissioner of the Council of Trent.
- Giovanni Vincenzo Sanfelice (c. 1575–1645), governor and master of the field in Brazil where he defeated the Dutch and was also master of the field in Flanders during the fighting of the Thirty Years' War; he was the first Prince of Monteverde.
- Giuseppe Maria Sanfelice (1615–1660), Archbishop of Cosenza, Governor of Fermo, Imola and Perugia and, in 1652, Apostolic Nuncio in Cologne.
- Camillo Sanfelice, Neapolitan nobleman, father of Ferdinando Sanfelice.
- Antonio Sanfelice, Bishop of Nardò, elder brother of Ferdinando Sanfelice.
- Ferdinando Sanfelice (1675–1748), Neapolitan architect and nobleman, was one of the major exponents of the Neapolitan Baroque.
- Fortunata Sanfelice, daughter of Ferdinando, noblewoman and amateur architect.
- Andrea Sanfelice (1763–1808), husband of Luisa Sanfelice, Regent of the Royal Library of Ferdinand of the Two Sicilies.
- Luisa Sanfelice (1764–1800), a follower of the Parthenopean Republic, was executed by order of King Ferdinand upon his return to power in Naples.
- Nazario Sanfelice, the Mayor of Naples from 1839 to 1847.
- Guglielmo Sanfelice d'Acquavilla (1834–1897), Cardinal and Archbishop of Naples from 1880.

== Residences ==
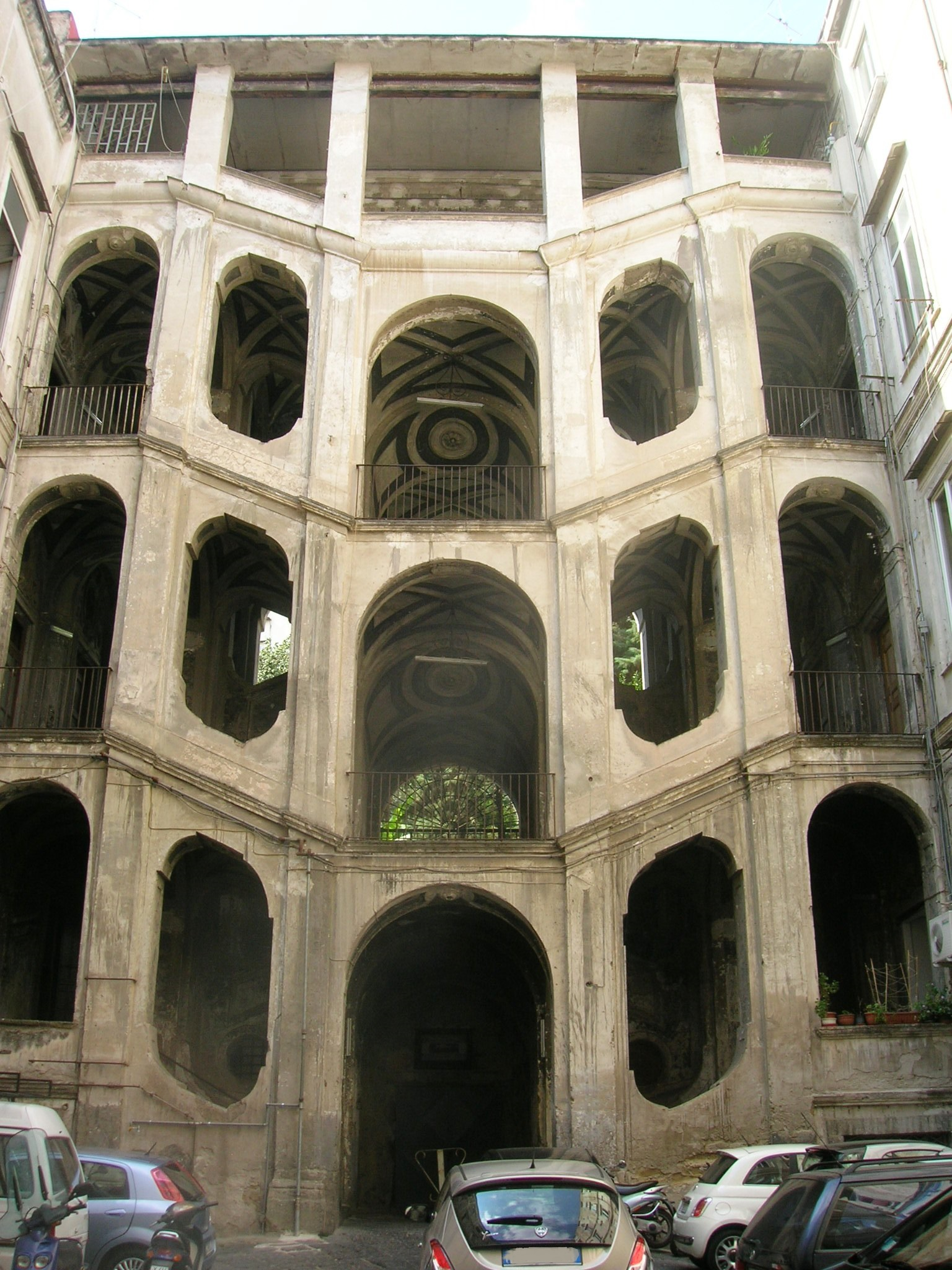
Courtyard staircases of Palazzo Sanfelice

=== Naples ===
- Palazzo Sanfelice, built at the beginning of the 18th century as a private residence by the architect Ferdinando Sanfelice.
- Palazzo Sanfelice di Bagnoli, a 16th-century building located in via Monte di Dio in Naples and which belonged to the family.
- Palazzo Sanfelice di Monteforte, located on Viale Gramsci. Commissioned by Prince Tommaso of Savoy to Augusto Ghidini in 1879, it was, however, purchased and inhabited by the Sanfelice di Monteforte family even before its completion.
- Palazzo Pisanelli, a building of late medieval origins, purchased and renovated at the beginning of the 18th century by the architect Ferdinando Sanfelice for his son Camillo. At the top of the portal is the quadripartite coat of arms which also shows the Sanfelice coat of arms.

=== Campania ===
- Villa Pandola Sanfelice, in Lauro a 19th-century building which at the end of the same century passed from the Pandola family to the Sanfelice family of Monteforte through a marriage.
