= Valentine de Riquet de Caraman-Chimay =

Belgian princess

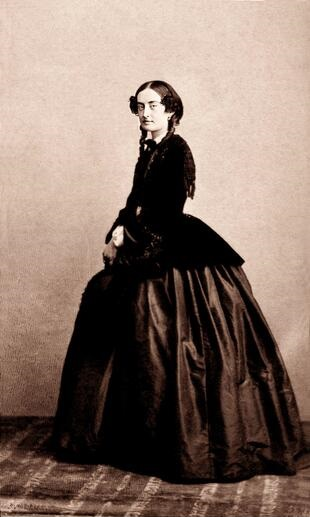
Valentine de Riquet de Caraman Chimay

Countess Valentine Marie Henriette de Riquet de Caraman–Chimay (15 February 1839 – 25 August 1914) was a Belgian princess.

== Early life ==
She was a younger daughter of Belgian diplomat and industrialist Joseph de Riquet de Caraman, 17th Prince de Chimay, and memoirist Émilie Pellapra, the widow of Comte de Brigode. From her parents' marriage, she had three siblings: Joseph de Riquet de Caraman-Chimay, Emilie de Riquet de Caraman (wife of Frédéric Lagrange), and Eugène de Riquet de Caraman (who married Louise de Graffenried-Villars). From her mother's first marriage, she had an elder half-brother, Henri, Marquis of Brigode who was the Mayor of Romilly (and married Annette du Hallay-Coëtquen).

Her paternal grandparents were François-Joseph-Philippe de Riquet, 16th Prince de Chimay, and Thérésa de Cabarrus, one of the leaders of Parisian social life during the Directory. His maternal grandparents were Françoise-Marie LeRoy and wealthy financier Henri de Pellapra, though Émilie claimed to be a daughter of Napoleon. Her niece, Hélène Marie de Riquet de Caraman, married John Francis Charles, 7th Count de Salis-Soglio.

== Personal life ==
Her first marriage was to Prince Paul de Bauffremont-Courtenay (1827–1893), son of Alphonse de Bauffremont, on 13 April 1861. He was a French general who known for leading the 'Charge de Sedan' alongside Gaston Alexandre Auguste in 1870. Before their divorce in 1875, they were the parents of two daughters:

- Princess Catherine-Marie-Josèphine de Bauffremont-Courtenay (1862–1932), who married diplomat Nicolas Wlassow, in Bucharest in 1888.
- Princess Jeanne-Marie-Émilie de Bauffremont-Courtenay (1864–1935), who married Don Luigi Sanfelice, Prince of Viggiano.

Before her divorce, she gave birth to a daughter, Marcela, she conceived with Romanian Prince Georges Bibescu. After their divorce, she gained custody of both children.

=== Second marriage ===
In 1875, she married Romanian Prince Georges Bibescu (1834–1902), son of Prince of Wallachia Gheorghe Bibescu and, his first wife, Zoe Brâncoveanu. Georges' elder brother, Grégoire (who inherited the Brâncoveanu patrimony), was the father of Princess Catherine Hélène Bibesco-Bassaraba, who married Valentine's nephew, Prince Alexandre de Caraman-Chimay (a son of her brother Joseph, 18th Prince de Chimay). After they married, Prince Georges and Valentine were the parents of three more children, only two of whom survived to adulthood:

- Princess Marcela Bibescu (1873–1957), who married Nicolae Vasile Cantacuzino; they were the parents of architect George Matei Cantacuzino.
- Princess Nadège Bibescu (1876–1955), who married Prince Barbu Știrbey, who became the 30th Prime Minister of the Kingdom of Romania in 1927; he was the son of Prince Alexandru Știrbey and his wife, Princess Maria Ghika-Comănești.
- Prince George Bibescu (1878–1879), who died in infancy.
- Prince Georges-Valentin Bibescu (1880–1941), who married writer Martha Lahovary, the third child of nobleman Ioan Lahovary and Princess Emma Mavrocordato.

The Princess died on 25 August 1914.
