= Francesco I Moncada, Prince of Paterno =

Francesco Moncada de Luna, 1st Prince of Paternò (1510 –23 February 1566) was an Italian nobleman in Spanish-ruled Sicily. He was invested as the first Prince of Paternò by King Philip II of Spain.

== Biography ==
He was born in Caltanissetta, son of Antonio, count of Adernò and Caltanissetta. In 1532 he wed Caterina Pignatelli Carafa, granddaughter of the viceroy of Sicily. Francesco served various roles in Sicily: Captain in Arms of Siracusa, Sicily, Catania, Augusta, Sicily, and the Val di Noto. He was named judge (stratigoto) of Messina. In 1565, to reward the loyalty of both Francesco and his father's family (Antonio had died in 1549), King Philip II of Spain invested the count Francesco with the hereditary title of Prince of Paternò.
