= La Tour-Blanche =

Commune in Dordogne, France

- Part of La Tour-Blanche-Cercles
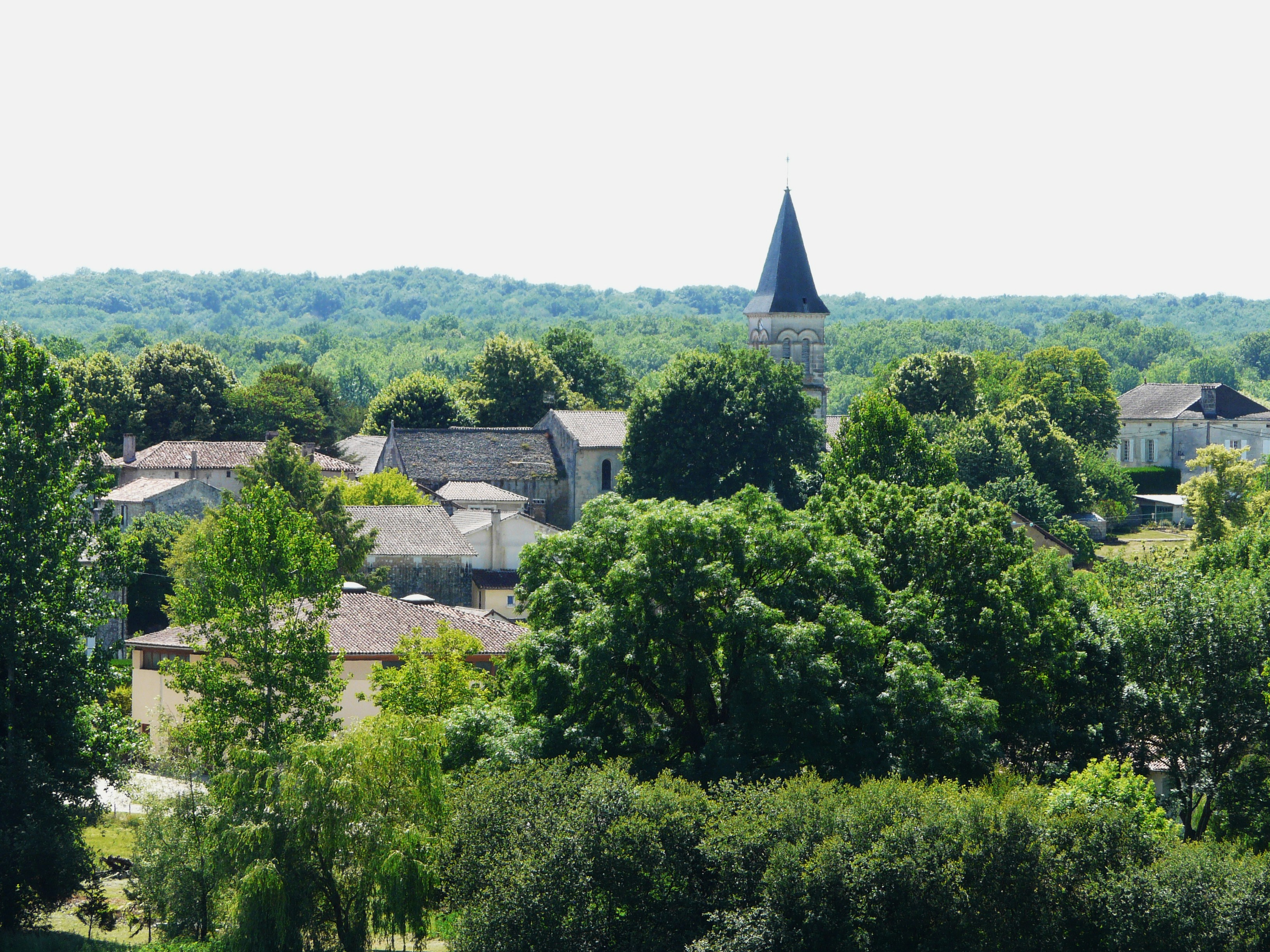
- Location of La Tour-Blanche
- Location within France Location within Nouvelle-Aquitaine
- Coordinates: 45°22′01″N 0°26′50″E
- Country: France
- Region: Nouvelle-Aquitaine
- Department: Dordogne
- Arrondissement: Périgueux
- Canton: Ribérac
- Commune: La Tour-Blanche-Cercles
- Area^{1}: 8.11 km^{2} (3.13 sq mi)
- Elevation: 145 m (476 ft)
- Highest elevation: 190 m (620 ft)
- Lowest elevation: 130 m (430 ft)
- Population (2023): 365
  - Density: 45.0/km^{2} (117/sq mi)
- Time zone: UTC+01:00 (CET)
  - Summer (DST): UTC+02:00 (CEST)
- Postal code: 24320
- ^{1} French Land Register data, which excludes lakes, ponds, glaciers > 1 km^{2} (0.386 sq mi or 247 acres) and river estuaries.

La Tour-Blanche (French pronunciation: [la tuʁ blɑ̃ʃ]; Occitan: La Tor Blancha) is a former commune in the Dordogne department in Nouvelle-Aquitaine in southwestern France. On 1 January 2017, it was merged into the new commune La Tour-Blanche-Cercles.

== See also ==
- Communes of the Dordogne department
