= House of Montcada =

Spanish noble family

Arms of the House of Montcada.

The House of Montcada (in Catalan; Moncada in Spanish and Italian) is an aristocratic and noble Catalan House with important ramifications in Sicily. Queen Elisenda of the Crown of Aragon was a member of the family.

== History ==
The House of Moncada was started by Guillem I de Muntanyola or de Vacarisses (b. ? - d. 1040). He was the son of Sunifred, the Vescomte de Girona (Viscount of Girona) who was granted the castle and lands of Montcada in Montcada i Reixac, Barcelona. Guillem I took the name Guillem I de Montcada in accordance with proper naming traditions upon being granted a landed title. Guillem I married Adelaida de Claramunt (b. 1000 - d. 1063). Their first child, Ramon I de Montcada, II Senyor del Castell de Montcada was appointed the office of Senescal of Barcelona and Catalonia. Their second son, Bernat I de Montcada became the Ardiaca (Archdeacon) of Barcelona. The third son, Renard de Montcada went on to become the Senyor del Castell (Lord of the Castle) of la Roca del Vallès and became the first head of the House of Sarroca or La Roca.

One of Ramón I's grandchildren, Guillem Ramon I de Montcada (b. ? - d. 1173), known as the Gran Senescal or the Dapifer became one of the infamous Nou Barons de la Fama who were the most influential nobles in the court of the Count of Barcelona. He became the Senescal of Ramon Berenguer III of Barcelona, Ramon Berenguer IV of Barcelona, and of Alfonso I of Aragón. During the governance of Ramon Berenguer IV, he negotiated the count's marriage with Petronilla of Aragon, the daughter of Ramiro I. This power move was the masterstroke in uniting the Kingdom of Aragon and the County of Barcelona. Guillemo Ramon was also present during the military campaigns in Tortosa and Fraga. He married his cousin, Beatriu de Montcada (another grandchild of Ramon I de Montcada), and the couple had two children. The firstborn, Guillem de Montcada, inherited the Viscounty of Béarn which passed in 1309 to the House of Foix-Castellbò. The second son, Ramon de Montcada el Vell, became the fourth Senescal and began the line of the lords of Tortosa and later of Fraga. His own son, Ramon de Montcada el Jove died fighting at the Battle of Portopí along with James I of Aragon in the Conquest of Majorca. His second son, Guillem Ramon, married Constance of Aragon, daughter of Peter II of Aragon and began a line that would hold lordship over Aitona. His cousin went on to further found a line of the family that moved to Sicily where they collaborated with the Sicilian Vespers.

The House of Montcada would go on to extend their roots throughout the Principality of Catalonia, Spain and parts of Europe. They intermarried with the noble houses of Aragon, Cardona, Béarn, Ayerbe, Cervera, Luna, Anglesola, Cornell, Aitona, Albalat, Abarca, Queralt, Vilaragut, Urgell, Entença, Illa Jordà, Pinós, Lloria, Seròs, Vilamarxant, Ribelles, Lioro, Tolsà, Caltanissetta, Vallgornera, Ventimiglia, Fenollar, and Sarrià amongst others.

== Titles ==
=== Princes of Paternò ===
Feudal era

- 1565–1568: Francesco Moncada de Luna Rosso
- 1568–1571: Cesare Moncada Pignatelli
- 1571–1592: Francesco Moncada de Luna Salviati
- 1612–1627: Antonio d'Aragona Moncada
- 1627–1673: Luigi Guglielmo Moncada d'Aragona La Cerda
- 1673–1713: Ferdinando Moncada d'Aragona Moncada
- 1713–1727: Caterina Moncada d'Aragona Fajardo
- 1747–1764: Francesco Rodrigo Moncada Ventimiglia
- 1764–1812: Giovanni Luigi Moncada Ventimiglia Ruffo

Post-feudal era

- 1812–1827: Giovanni Luigi Moncada Ventimiglia Ruffo
- 1827–1861: Pietro Moncada Beccadelli di Bologna
- 1861–1895: Corrado Moncada Bajada
- 1895–1920: Pietro Moncada Starrabba
- 1920–1946: Ugo Moncada Valguarnera

Post-monarchical era

- 1946–1973: Ugo Moncada Valguarnera
- 1973–2001: Pietro Moncada Lanza Branciforte
- 2001–2012: Francesco Rodrigo Moncada Lanza Branciforte
- 2012–Present: Ugo Moncada Verde

== See also ==
- Ramón I de Moncada
