= Gaston Palewski =

French politician (1901–1984)

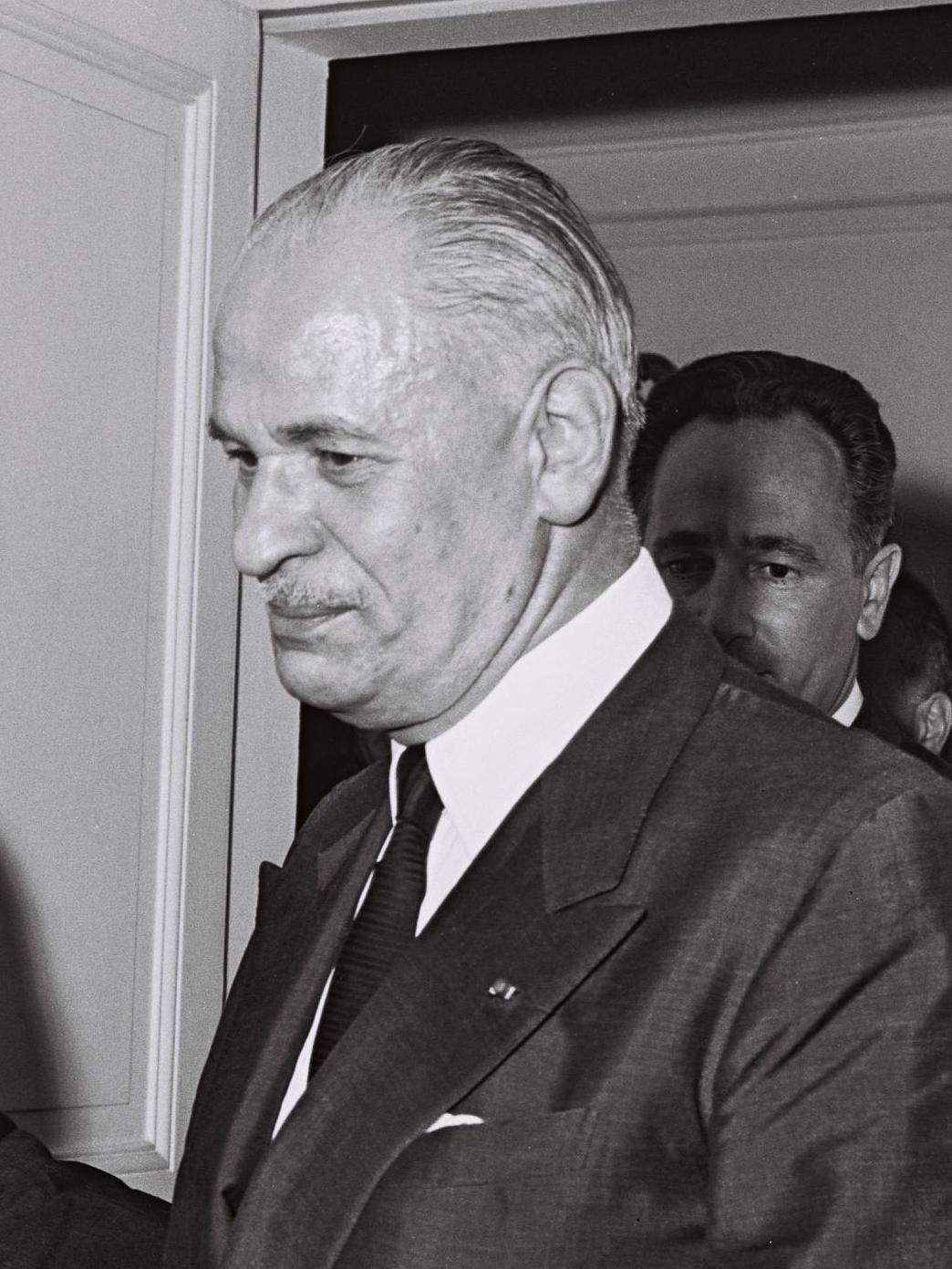

President of the Constitutional Council
- In office 5 March 1965 – 5 March 1974
- Appointed by: Charles de Gaulle
- Preceded by: Léon Noël
- Succeeded by: Roger Frey

Personal details
- Born: 20 March 1901 Paris, France
- Died: 3 September 1984 (aged 83) Le Val-Saint-Germain, France
- Education: University of Paris; University of Oxford

Gaston Palewski (20 March 1901 – 3 September 1984), a French politician, was a close associate of Charles de Gaulle during and after World War II. He is also remembered as the lover of the English novelist Nancy Mitford, and appears in a fictionalised form in two of her novels.

== Biography ==
Palewski was born in Paris into a Jewish family, the son of industrialist Maurice Serge Moïse Herch Palewski (1867 in Kobryń, Poland, (now Belarus), Russian Empire – 1938) and his wife Rose (née Diamant-Berger; 1869 in Buzău, Romania – 1954). Gaston Palewski was educated at the Sorbonne, at the École Libre des Sciences Politiques and at Oxford University—he spoke excellent English and was a convinced Anglophile. Using family connections, he obtained a post with Marshal Hubert Lyautey, the French Resident-General in Morocco. In 1928 he became principal private secretary to Paul Reynaud, a leading politician who was then Minister for Finances and who became Prime Minister of France in March 1940. Through Reynaud, in 1934, he first met Charles de Gaulle, and became a supporter of his political and military views.

On the outbreak of war in 1939 Palewski was commissioned as a lieutenant in the French Air Force, and saw action following the German invasion of France in May 1940. He was in French North Africa at the time of the armistice of June 1940. Refusing to accept France's defeat, he reached London at the end of August and joined de Gaulle's Free French Forces. De Gaulle appointed him Director of Political Affairs of the Free French movement, and he played a leading role in negotiations between de Gaulle and the British government, which at first regarded de Gaulle with scepticism. In March 1941 he was given the rank of lieutenant-colonel and command of the Free French Army in East Africa, leading it against the Italian forces during the recapture of French Somaliland (now Djibouti). In September 1942, he was recalled to London to become de Gaulle's Directeur du Cabinet, a post in which he followed de Gaulle from London to Algiers in 1943 and then in August 1944 to liberated Paris. He became known as de Gaulle's homme de confiance (right-hand man), and his diplomatic skills and knowledge of the British made him invaluable to de Gaulle, who neither understood the British nor trusted them.

Palewski remained director of de Gaulle's cabinet (that is, his private office) until de Gaulle's resignation as head of the Provisional Government in January 1946. He then became a leading proponent of Gaullism and one of the founders of the first Gaullist party, the Rassemblement du Peuple Français (Rally of the French People, or RPF) in 1947. In 1951 he was elected to the National Assembly as an RPF deputy for the Department of the Seine (Paris). From 1953 to 1955 he was vice-president of the National Assembly. Following the failure of the RPF, however, he withdrew from politics. In 1957, at de Gaulle's request, he was appointed Ambassador to Italy, a post he held until 1962. In 1962 Palewski was appointed by Prime Minister Georges Pompidou as Minister of State in charge of Scientific Research, Atomic Energy and Space Questions, the first French minister with specific responsibility for such matters. On 1 May 1962 Palewski witnessed the French underground nuclear test codenamed "Béryl" in Algeria. The test shaft failed to contain the blast and he was exposed to radiation as result of a leak of radioactive lava and dust into the atmosphere. He believed that the leukemia which he contracted later in life was caused by this accident. From 1965 to 1974 he was President of the Constitutional Council of France. Palewski died of leukemia in 1984, aged 83.

== Decorations and honorary positions ==
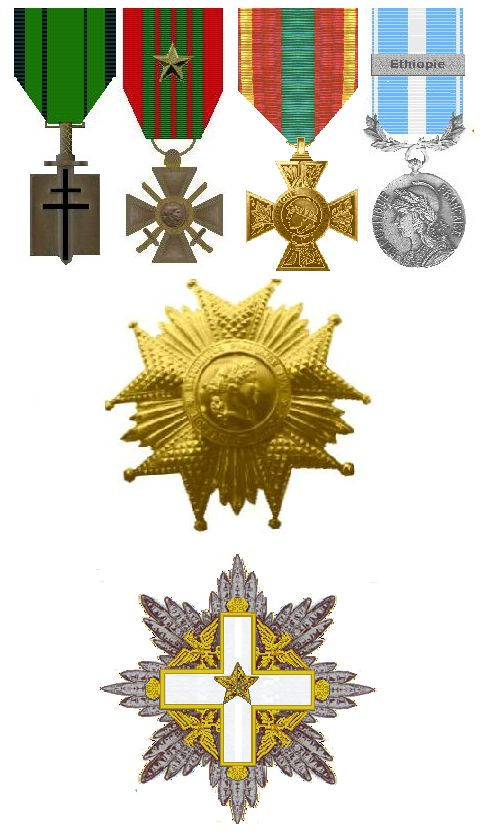
Palewski's decorations. The Compagnon de la Libération, Croix de Guerre with star, Croix du combattant volontaire, Médaille Coloniale with bar "Éthiopie" and the stars of the two grand-crosses

After 1974 he held a number of honorary posts. An amateur painter of some talent, he was a member of the Académie des Beaux-Arts.

Because of his high office and his record in the war Palewski was awarded several French decorations. After his term as an ambassador to the Italian government, not to the Holy See, he was awarded an Italian Grand Cross.

- The Grand Croix of the Légion d'Honneur,
- The title and cross of a Compagnon de la Libération,
- The Croix de Guerre (twice),
- The Médaille Coloniale, with a bar
- The Croix du combattant volontaire 1939–1945.
- The Grand Cross of the Order of Merit of the Italian Republic

== Personal life ==
Palewski was a notorious womaniser, and this earned him a reputation for frivolity that damaged his prospects for a serious political career. Only his standing with de Gaulle, to whom he was devoted and loyal, enabled him to hold high office. During the war in London he met the English writer and society figure Nancy Mitford, and began with her a long, passionate but intermittent affair. They were separated during the latter part of the war, but in 1946 she moved permanently to Paris, and their relationship, though never public, lasted until her death in 1973. This did not prevent him becoming involved with many other women. In 1969, without formally ending his affair with Mitford—he was with her when she died—he married Helen-Violette de Talleyrand-Périgord (1915–2003), Duchess of Sagan, the daughter of the seventh Duke of Talleyrand and his wife Anna Gould. The two had been having a long affair prior to the duchess's divorce from her first husband and had had a son out of wedlock.

In the English-speaking world, Palewski is known chiefly through his appearance as Fabrice, duc de Sauveterre, in two of Mitford's novels, The Pursuit of Love (1945) and Love in a Cold Climate (1949). The first of these contains a fairly accurate portrayal of their relationship, although it is moved from postwar to prewar Paris. Despite Mitford's love for Palewski, she did not hide his many infidelities in her novels. He took no offence at this, and when Mitford proposed to dedicate The Pursuit of Love to "The Colonel", he insisted on his real name being used.

Legal offices
Preceded by Léon Noël	President of the Constitutional Council; 1965–1974	Succeeded by Roger Frey
