= Duke of Talleyrand =

French noble title (1814–1968)

Coat of arms of the Dukes of Talleyrand, as borne by Charles Maurice de Talleyrand-Périgord

Duke of Talleyrand was a French noble title that was created in 1814 for the House of Talleyrand-Périgord. The title became extinct in 1968.

== Creation of the title ==
Charles Maurice de Talleyrand-Périgord was a statesman of the end of the 18th century and beginning of the 19th. As Minister of Foreign Affairs and Grand Chamberlain under Napoleon I, he received the title of Prince of Benevento in 1806.

At the time of the defeat of Napoleon in 1814, Talleyrand acted for the restoration of Louis XVIII and the establishment of a constitutional monarchy. As Foreign Minister, he negotiated the terms of the Treaty of Paris. As compensation for his work, he received the title of Prince Talleyrand and a seat in the Chamber of Peers.

In 1815, the title was made hereditary, then attributed in 1817 to his nephew Edmond; the letters patent of the title were published in 1818, with a promise of establishment of majorat effective in 1821.

== List of Dukes ==
1st Duke (1814–1838): Charles-Maurice de Talleyrand-Périgord (1754–1838) and Prince Talleyrand. His younger brother Archambaud de Talleyrand-Périgord (1762–1838) obtained the title Duke of Talleyrand by courtesy during the life of his brother.

2nd Duke (1838–1872): Alexander Edmond de Talleyrand-Périgord (1787–1872), nephew of Prince Talleyrand and son of Archambaud de Talleyrand. Also known as Duke of Dino.

3rd Duke (1872–1898): Napoléon Louis de Talleyrand-Périgord (1811–1898), son of Edmond de Talleyrand. Known initially as Duke of Valençay.

4th Duke (1898–1910): Charles William Frederick Boson of Talleyrand-Périgord (1832–1910), son of Louis de Talleyrand. Known under his other title of Duke of Sagan.

5th Duke (1910–1937): Marie Pierre Louis Hélie of Talleyrand-Périgord (1859–1937), son of Boson de Talleyrand. Known under his other title of Prince of Sagan.

6th Duke (1937–1952): Paul Louis Marie Archambault Boson de Talleyrand-Périgord (1867–1952), brother of Hélie de Talleyrand. Known as the Duke of Valençay.

7th Duke (1952–1968): Hélie de Talleyrand-Périgord (1882–1968), cousin of Boson de Talleyrand, first known as Marquis de Talleyrand.

== See also ==
- Duke of Dino
- Duke of Sagan
