= Boson II de Talleyrand-Périgord =

French nobleman (1867–1952)

- Born: Paul Louis Marie Archambault Boson de Talleyrand-Périgord; July 20, 1867; Paris
- Died: May 9, 1952 (aged 84); Valençay
- Spouses: Helen Stuyvesant Morton (m. 1901; div. 1904) Silvia Victoria Rodiguez de Rivas de Castillesa de Guzman (m. 1938; div. 1943) Antoinette Marie Joséphine Morel (m. 1950)
- Parent(s): Boson de Talleyrand-Périgord; Jeanne Seillière

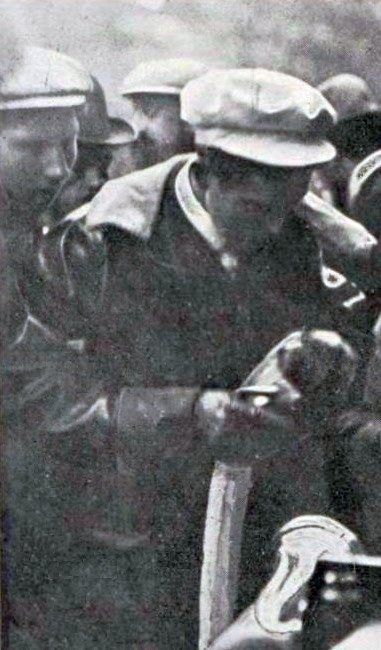
Boson II in 1901

Paul Louis Marie Archambault Boson de Talleyrand-Périgord (July 20, 1867 – May 9, 1952), 6th Duke of Talleyrand and Duke de Valençay, Prince, then Duke of Sagan, was a French nobleman and son of Boson de Talleyrand-Périgord.

== Early life ==
Boson was born on July 20, 1867, as the son of Boson de Talleyrand-Périgord, the Duke of Żagań and the Duke of Talleyrand (1832–1910) and Jeanne Seillière (1839–1905), heiress of the Baron de Seilliere, a supplier of military supplies who got rich during the Franco-Prussian War. His older brother was Hélie de Talleyrand-Périgord (1859–1937), the Duke of Żagań and the later Duke de Talleyrand-Périgord.

His paternal grandparents were Napoleon de Talleyrand-Périgord (1811–1898), the Duke of Żagań, the Duke de Talleyrand and the Duke de Valençay and Anne Louise Charlotte de Montmorency (1810–1858). His paternal great-grandparents were Edmond de Talleyrand-Périgord, prince Dino (1787–1872), and later prince de Talleyrand, and Dorothea of Courland, duchess of Sagan (1793–1862).

=== Peerage ===
When on May 27, 1929, his nephew Howard Maurice de Talleyrand-Périgord, Duke of Sagan, committed suicide, Boson was awarded the title of Duke of Sagan. He was a prince until 1935, when the authorities of the Third Reich confiscated Żagań. Despite this, the title of prince continued to be held by Boson II, who held it until May 9, 1952, and then was ruled by his cousin Hélie de Talleyrand-Périgord de Pourtalès (1882–1968). On October 25, 1937, his brother Hélie de Talleyrand-Périgord, Duke de Talleyrand-Périgord, dies of a heart attack, the title of Duke de Talleyrand-Périgord then falls to Boson II, as the only son Hélie died in 1929. Boson becomes His Serene Highness, Duke de Talleyrand, and hold this title until his death in 1952. Boson II was also the Duke of Valençay.

== Personal life ==
On October 5, 1901, he married Helen Stuyvesant Morton (1876–1952), daughter of former US Vice President Levi Morton. They divorced in 1904. Boson remarried on November 26, 1938, to Silvia Victoria Rodríguez de Rivas de Castilles de Guzmán. The couple divorced in 1943. On January 16, 1950, Boson marries Antoinette Marie Joséphine Morel for the third time.

Talleyrand died childless on May 9, 1952, in Valençay.

== See also ==
- House of Talleyrand-Périgord
