= Marie Clotilde Bonaparte =

- Countess Serge de Witt
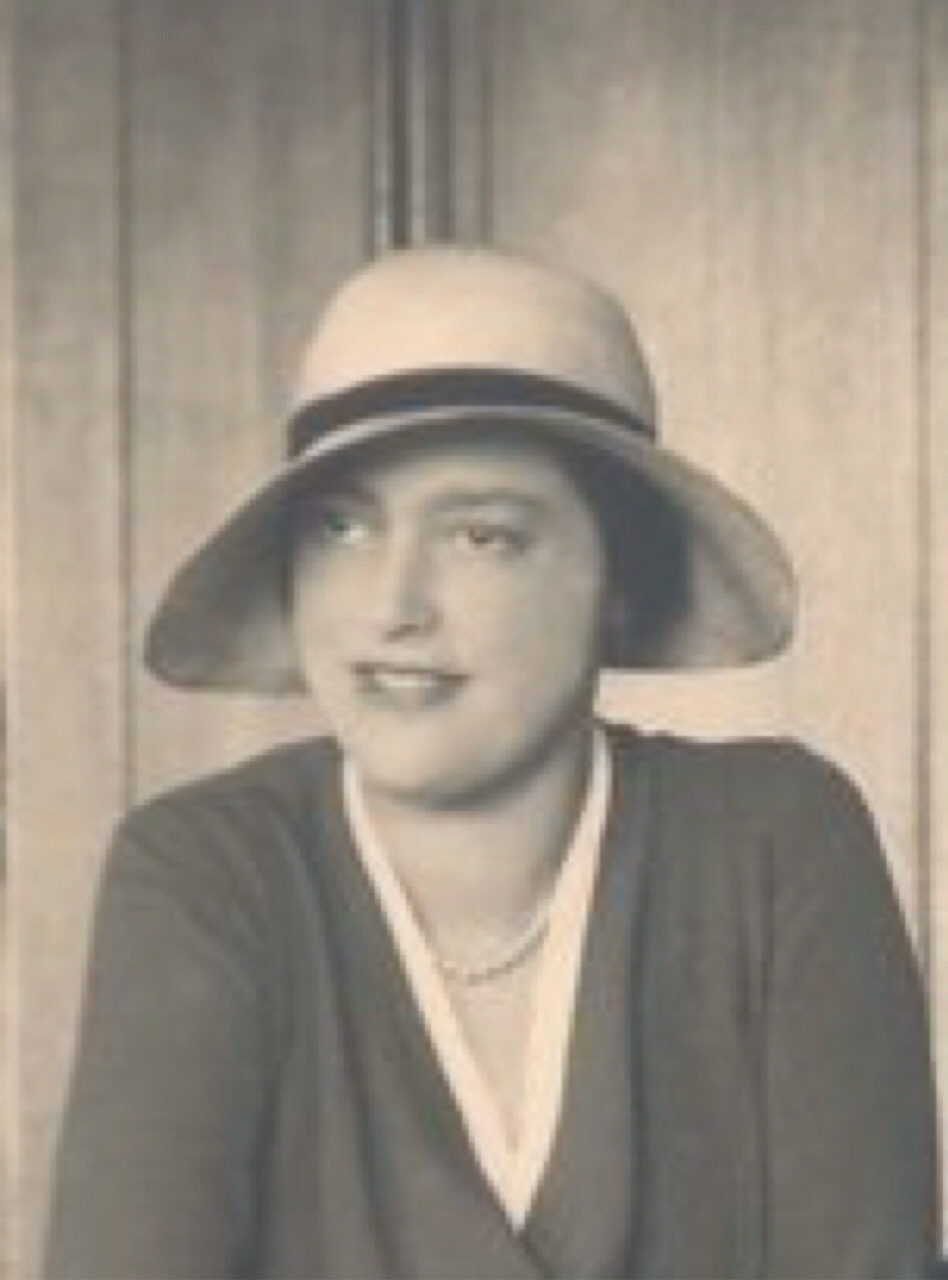
- Born: 20 March 1912; Brussels, Belgium
- Died: 14 April 1996 (aged 84); Cendrieux, France
- Spouse: Count Serge de Witt (m. 1938; died 1990)
- Issue: Marie Eugénie de Witt; Hélène de Witt; Napoléon Serge de Witt; Yolande de Witt; Vera de Witt; Baudoin de Witt; Isabelle de Witt; Jean Jerome de Witt; Vladimir de Witt; Anne de Witt
Names
- Marie Clotilde Eugénie Alberte Laetitia Geneviève
- House: Bonaparte
- Father: Victor, Prince Napoléon
- Mother: Princess Clémentine of Belgium

Marie Clotilde Eugénie Alberte Laetitia Geneviève Bonaparte (20 March 1912, Brussels, Belgium – 14 April 1996, Château de la Pommerie, Cendrieux, France) was a French princess of the Bonaparte dynasty, the eldest child of Victor, Prince Napoléon and his wife, Princess Clémentine of Belgium.

== Birth ==
Marie Clotilde Bonaparte was born on 20 March 1912, in Brussels, Belgium. When she was born, her parents were already 50 and 40 years old, respectively, as they had not been allowed to marry each other as long as Clémentine's father, King Leopold II of Belgium, had been alive (he died in 1909).

One of her aunts was Stephanie, once a Crown Princess of Austria-Hungary.

== Marriage ==
On 17 October 1938, in London, England, she married Count Serge de Witt (30 December 1891 – 21 July 1990, Cendrieux, France), with whom she had ten children:

- Marie Eugénie de Witt (b. 29 August 1939), married, firstly, Count Peter Cheremetieff on 9 November 1961, no issue, divorced in 1975. Married, secondly, Count Hélie de Pourtalès (grandson of Hélie de Talleyrand-Périgord, Duke of Sagan, and his wife, Anna Gould) on 24 October 1975, no issue.
- Hélène de Witt (b. 22 November 1941, Sousse, Tunisia), married Henri du Lau d'Allemans, Marquis du Lau d'Allemans (b. 17 Mar 1927 in Paris) on 17 October 1959, in Paris, and had three children.
- Napoléon Serge de Witt (2 November 1942 – 6 November 1942), died young.
- Yolande de Witt (9 November 1943 – 6 July 1945), died young.
- Vera de Witt (b. 7 November 1945 in Monastir, Tunisia) married Godefroi de Commarque, Marquis de Commarque (b. 18 December 1938 in Urval, France, on 11 April 1966, in Paris, France and had two children. Her younger son was married to Cecilie, daughter of Kraft, Prince of Hohenlohe-Langenburg.
- Baudoin de Witt (b. 24 January 1947) married Isabelle de Rocca-Serra (b. 8 January 1950 in Vienna, Austria) on 24 August 1968, in Cendrieux, and had three children (Alexandra de Witt [Madame de Montaudoüin], Jean-Emmanuel de Witt and Laëtitia de Witt [Countess de Villelume]).
- Isabelle de Witt (b. 26 January 1949) married Remmest Laan (b. 29 July 1942), on 25 June 1970, in Vienna, and had three sons.
- Jean Jerome de Witt (b. 12 April 1950) married firstly Véronique de Dryver (b. 26 December 1950) on 21 October 1970, in Sint-Genesius-Rode, Belgium, had three children (Alexandre de Witt, Marie-Clothilde de Witt and Iliona de Witt), and divorced before August 1992. Married secondly Viviane Jutheau (b. 1947) on 31 August 1992, no issue.
- Wladimir de Witt (b. 27 January 1952) married, firstly, Marguerite Mautner von Markhof (b. 15 March 1954) on 30 April 1976, and had three children (Elena de Witt [Baroness von Gravenreuth], Victor de Witt and Ségolène de Witt) before divorcing in 1993. Married, secondly, Françoise Martin-Flory (b. 28 May 1959) on 20 November 1993, in Paris, and had three children (Hortense de Witt [Madame Barry de Longchamps], Dimitri de Witt and Igor de Witt).
- Anne de Witt (b. 28 September 1953 in Bergerac) married Henry Robert de Rancher (1949–1995) on 7 June 1975, in Cendrieux, and had two sons.

== Ancestry ==
Ancestors of Marie Clotilde Bonaparte

8. Jérôme, King of Westphalia
4. Prince Napoléon-Jérôme Bonaparte
9. Princess Catharina of Württemberg
2. Victor, Prince Napoléon
10. Victor Emmanuel II of Italy
5. Princess Maria Clotilde of Savoy
11. Archduchess Adelaide of Austria
1. Princess Marie Clotilde Oldenburg Bonaparte
12. Leopold I of Belgium
6. Leopold II of Belgium
13. Princess Louise of Orléans
3. Princess Clémentine of Belgium
14. Archduke Joseph, Palatine of Hungary
7. Archduchess Marie Henriette of Austria
15. Duchess Maria Dorothea of Württemberg
