= Château de Sainte-Alvère =

Medieval castle in Nouvelle-Aquitaine, France

Coordinates: 44.9462°N 0.8091°E

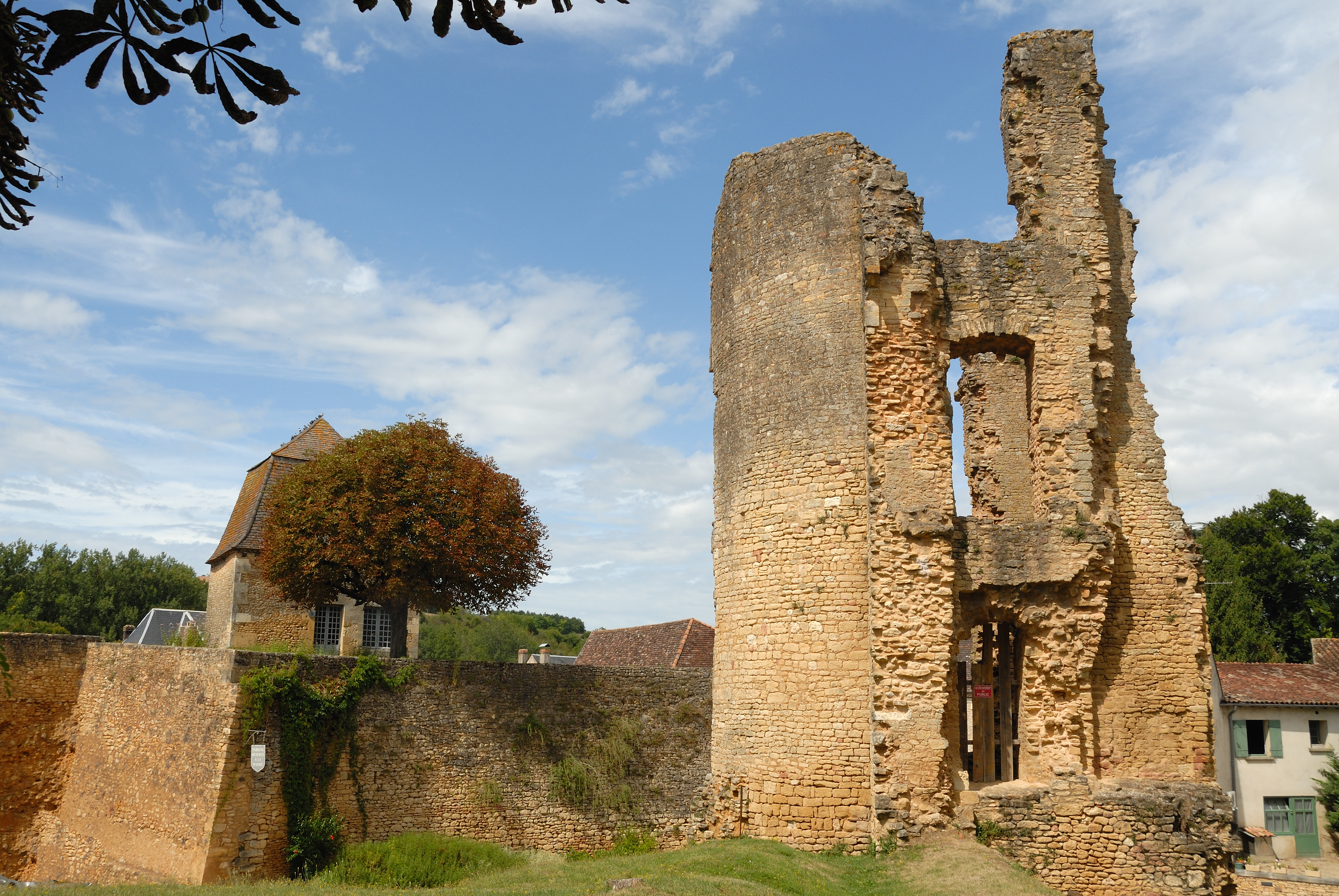
Remains of the Master tower of Sainte-Alvère castle

The château de Sainte-Alvère, also known as the château de Lostanges, is a medieval castle in the town of Sainte-Alvère, in the commune of Val de Louyre et Caudeau in the department of Dordogne, in the Nouvelle-Aquitaine in France.

== History ==
A first lord, Pierre de Limeuil, was mentioned in 1284. In 1448, the castle came into the possession of the Lostanges family, who owned it until the French Revolution. In 1778, the castle was described as "vast, surrounded by a beautiful moat flanked by beautiful towers, and surrounded by walls that in the past may have been its defence". In 1795, a large part of the castle was demolished, as ordered by Joseph Lakanal, administrator of the Dordogne department.

== Architecture ==
Of the castle and its enclosure, several remains have survived.

The tour maîtresse (master tower) is the only remnant of the actual castle. It is a circular tower 18 metres (59 ft) high with a diameter of 8.8 metres (29 ft), composed of four levels. Often referred to as a keep, it is actually not the original main tower of the 13th century castle, but a more modest tower from the late 15th century, endowed with gunholes. The gatehouse is a 15 metres (49 ft) high rectangular tower. It provided access to the castle by means of a drawbridge. Currently, the gatehouse is undergoing restoration. The tour des dames (ladies' tower) is located at the north-west corner of the enclosure. The gendarmerie tower is located at the northernmost part of the enclosure, close to the former gendarmerie building. Like the ladies' tower, its ground plan is horseshoe-shaped. The north-east tower has a horseshoe-shaped ground plan, flattened at the salient. It has a mansard roof which may date from the 17th century.

The dovecote is a small tower is located not far from the south-east corner of the enclosure, and has several pigeonholes.

== Protection ==
The castle has been inscribed as a monument historique by the French Ministry of Culture since 1948.

== Gallery ==
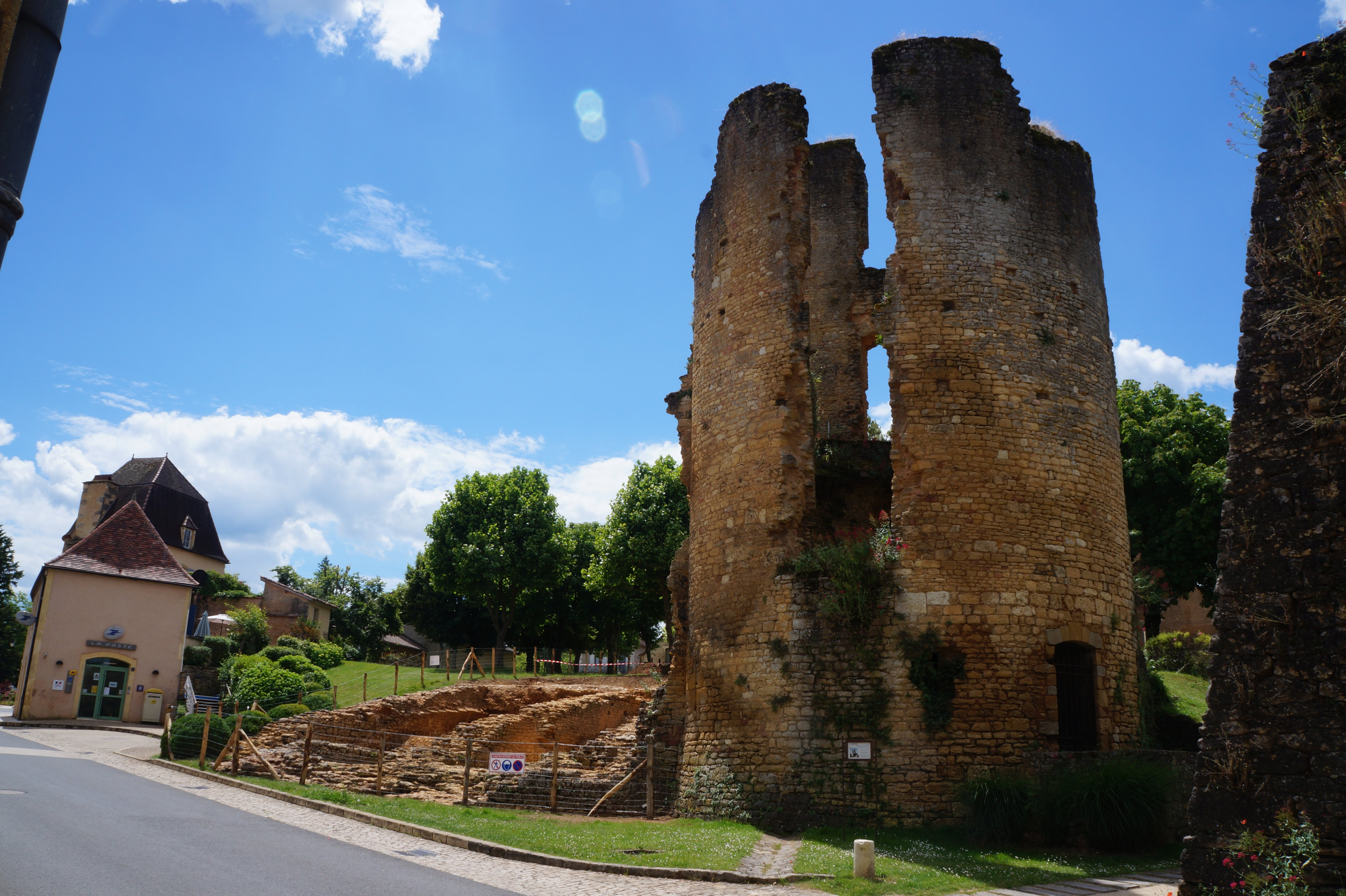
The master tower

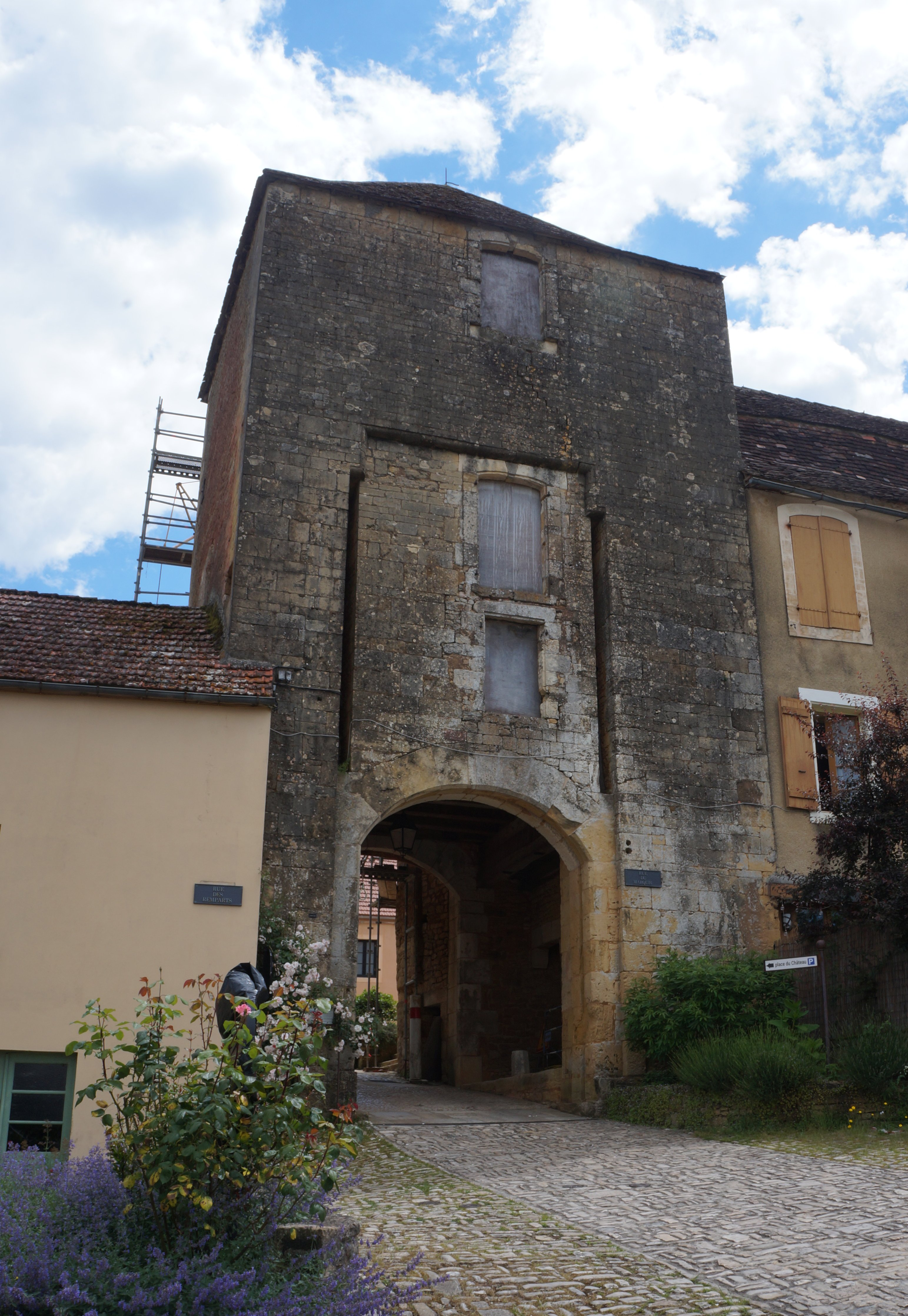
The gatehouse or châtelet

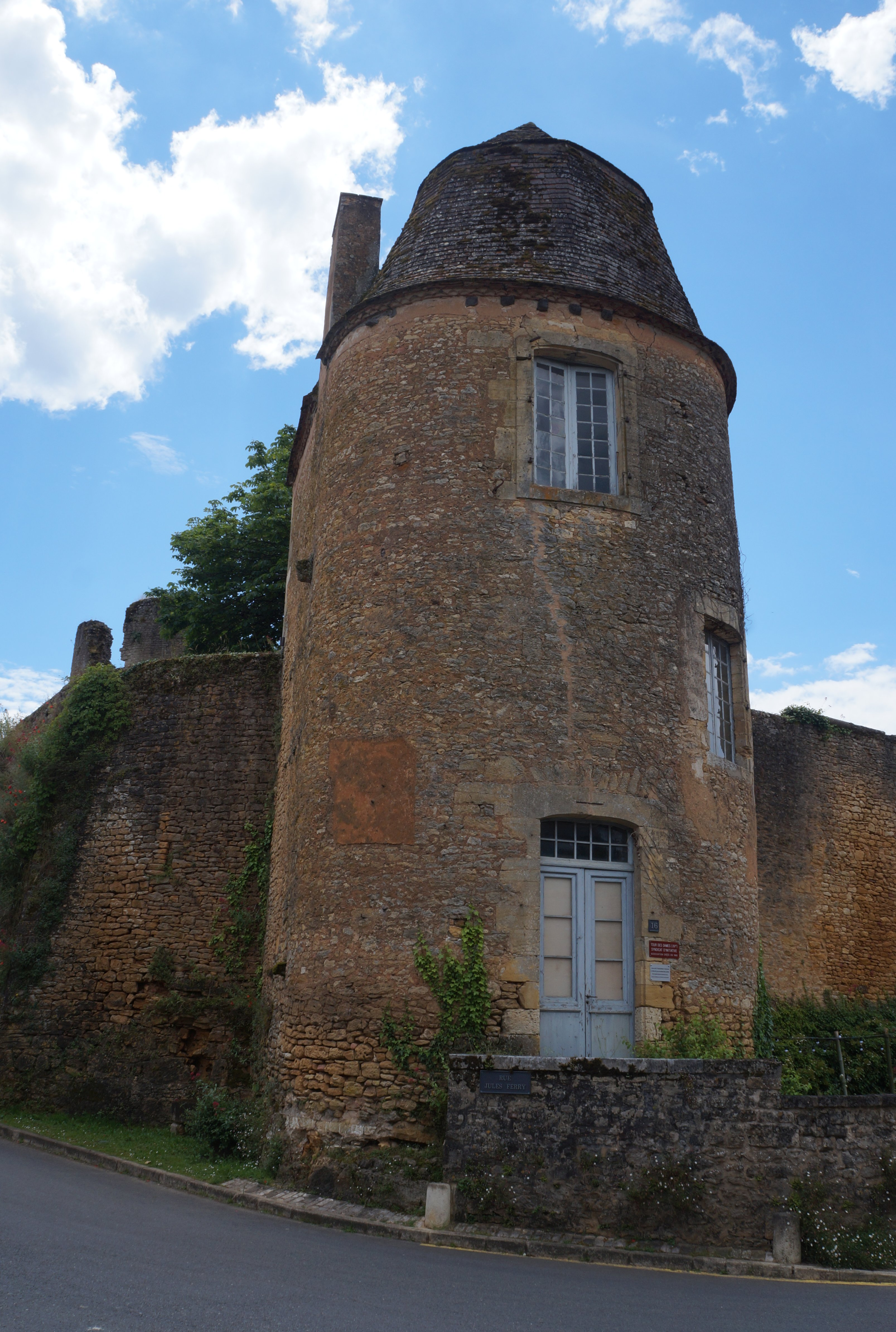
The ladies' tower

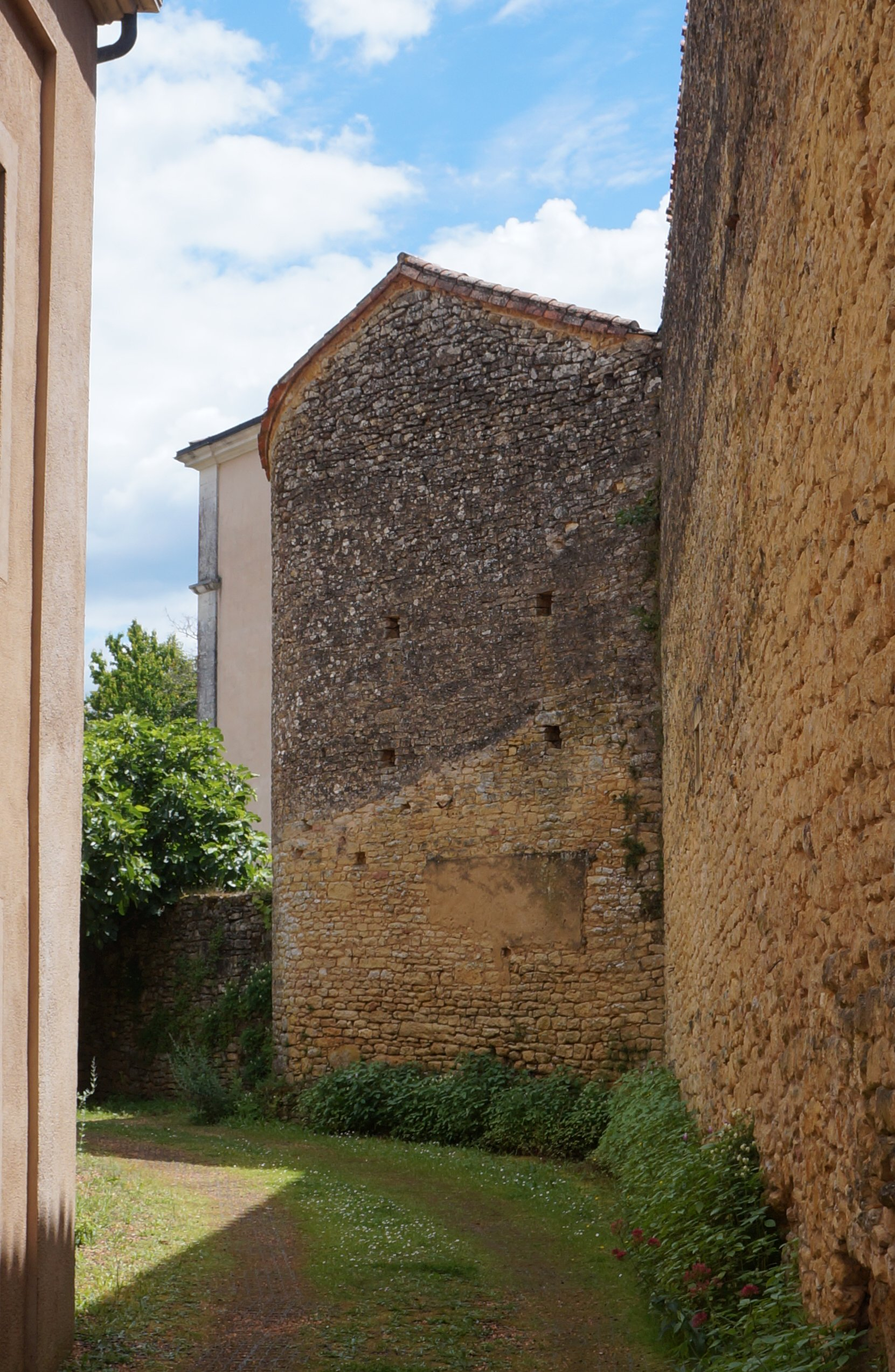
The gendarmerie tower

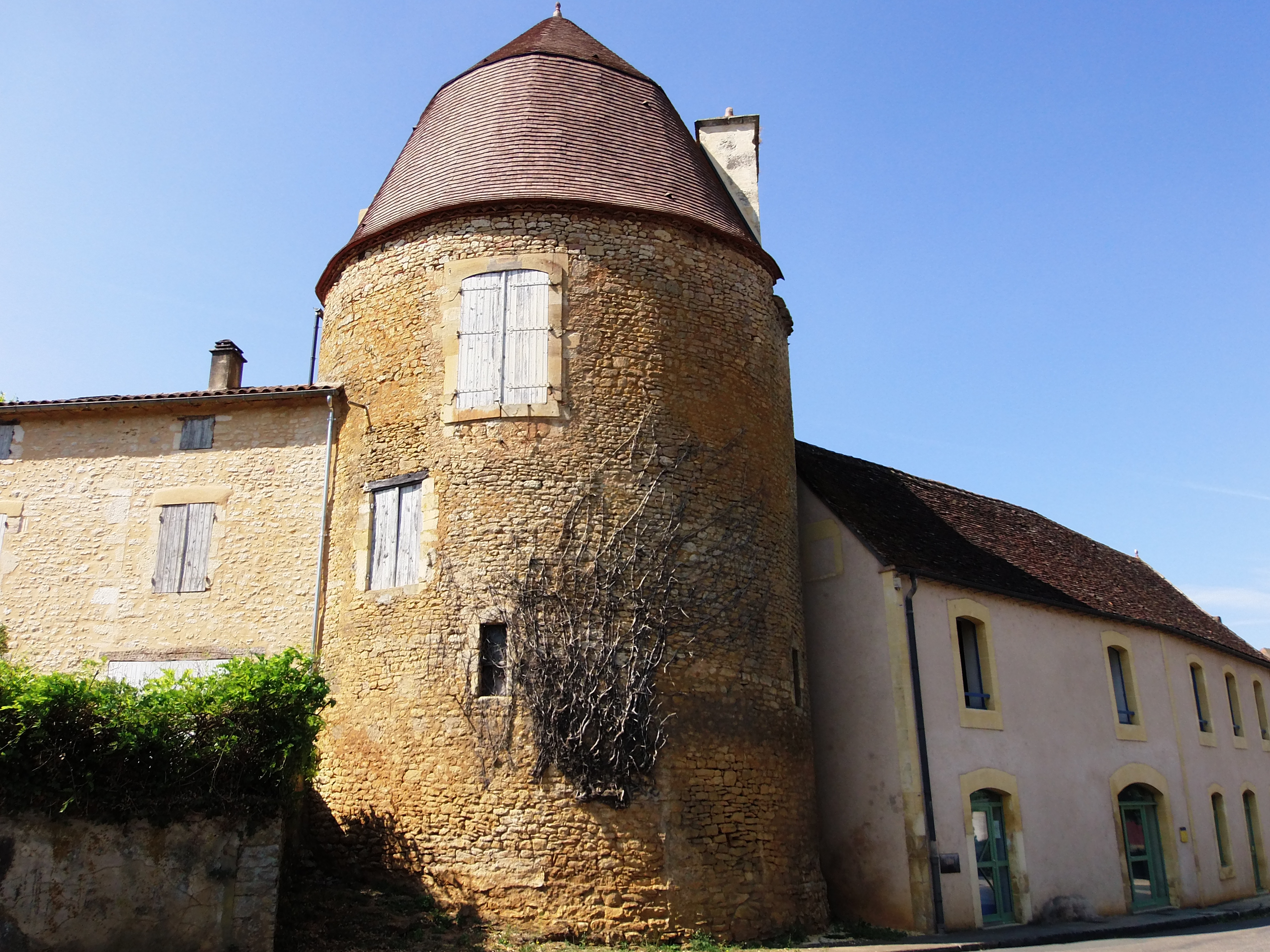
The north-east tower

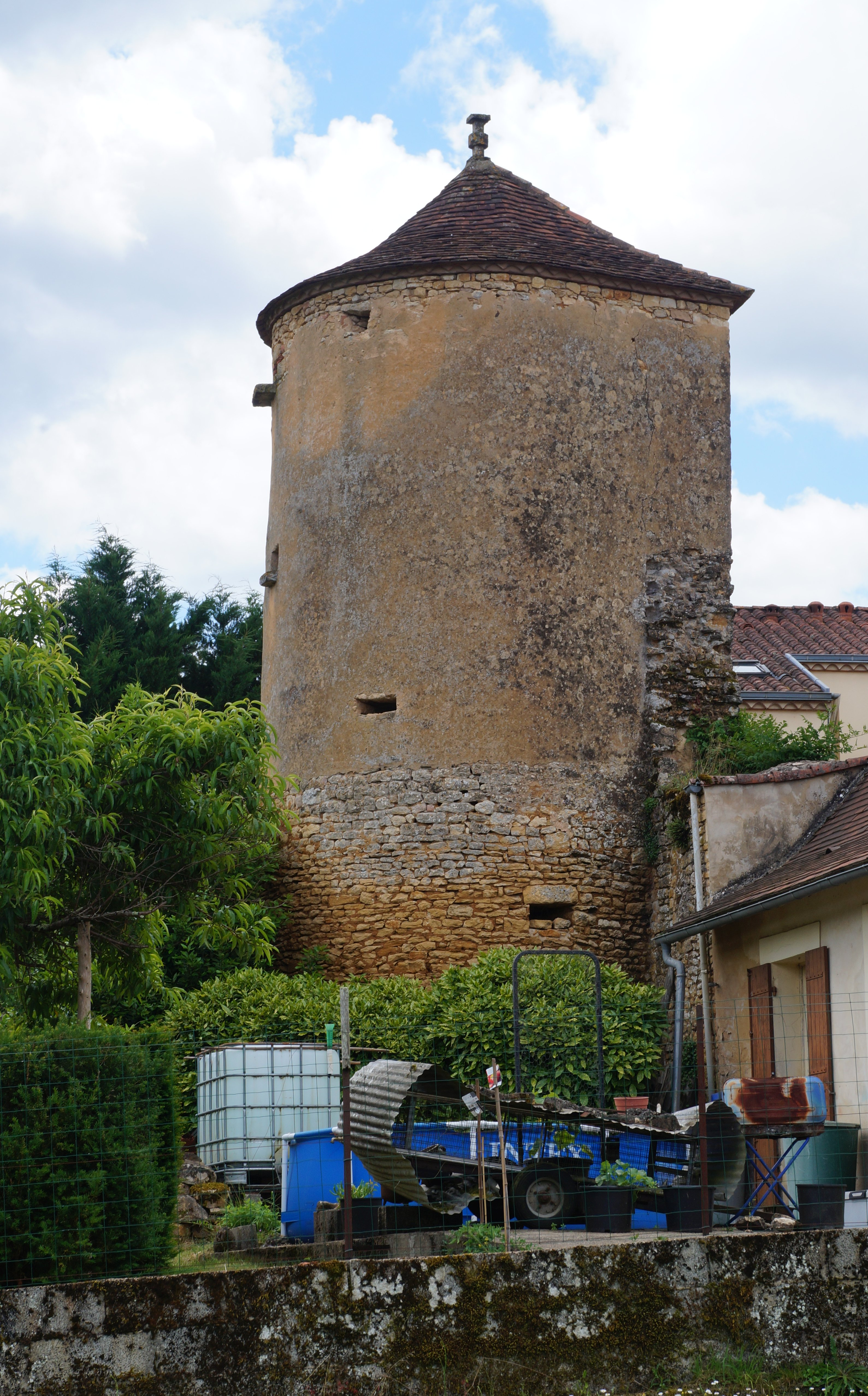
The dovecote

== See also ==
- List of castles in France

== Bibliography ==
- Anne Bécheau, Histoire du château et des remparts de Sainte-Alvère. Dossier documentaire, 2022.
- Cyril Yovitchitch, Le château et les fortifications de Sainte-Alvère. Diagnostic sommaire d’archéologie du bâti, 2023.
