= Anna Gould =

American heiress and socialite (1875–1961)

- Duchess of Talleyrand and Dino; Duchess of Sagan
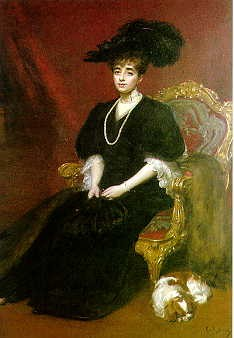
- circa 1900
- Born: June 5, 1875
- Died: November 30, 1961 (aged 86)
- Spouses: Boni de Castellane (m. 1895; div. 1906) Hélie de Talleyrand-Périgord (m. 1908; died 1937)
- Issue: Boniface de Castellane
- Parents: Jay Gould; Helen Day Miller

Anna Gould (June 5, 1875 – November 30, 1961) was an American socialite and heiress as the daughter of financier Jay Gould. She was the last private owner of the historic Lyndhurst estate in Tarrytown, New York.

== Life ==
Anna Gould was born on June 5, 1875, in New York City. She was the daughter of Jay Gould (1836–1892) and Helen Day Miller (1838–1889). Her siblings included George Jay Gould I, Edwin Gould I, Helen Miller Gould Shepard, Howard Gould, and Frank Jay Gould.

== Personal life ==
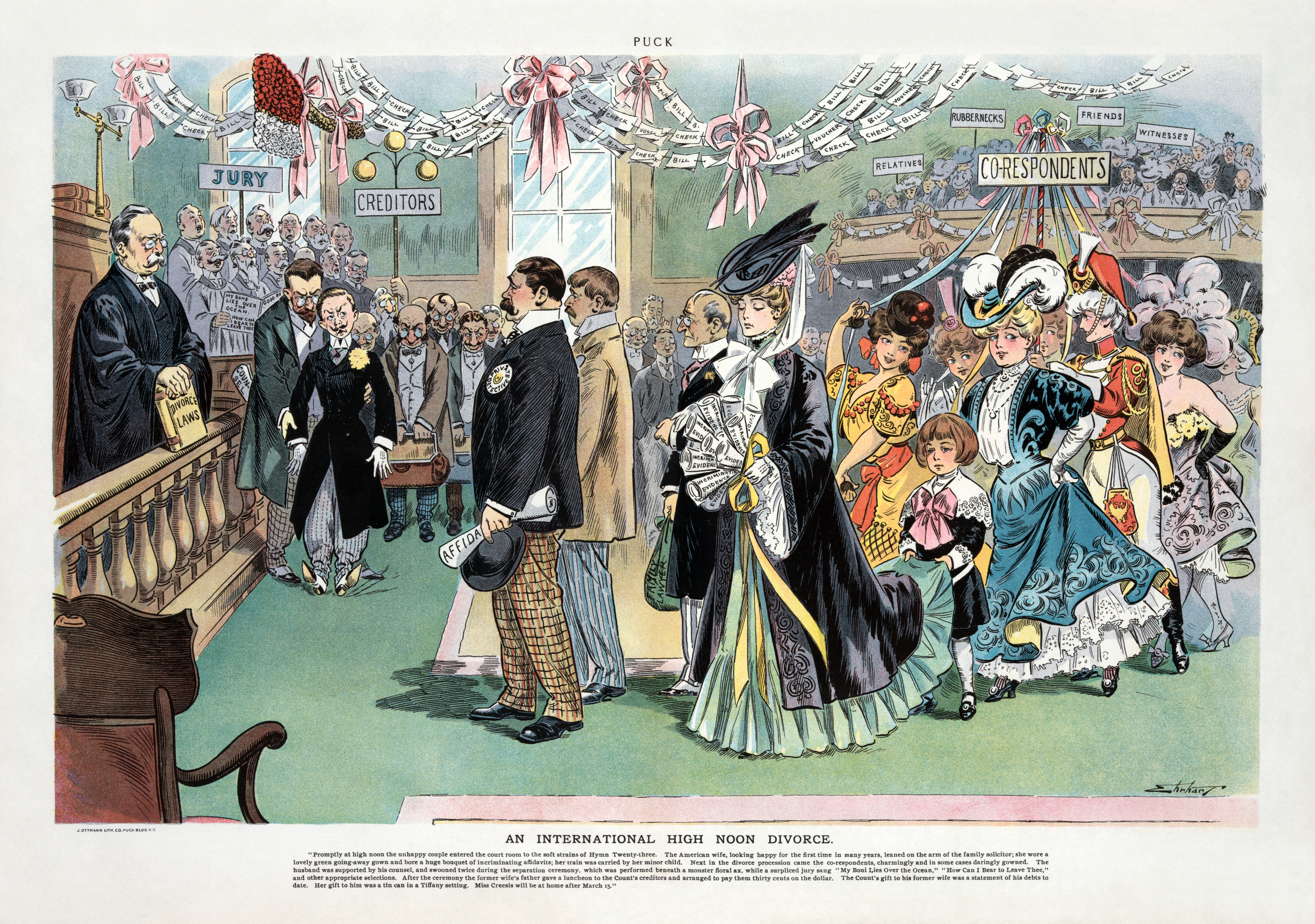
A parody of the circus-like atmosphere of the divorce proceedings of Anna Gould, shown holding a bouquet made of indictments against her husband, Boni de Castellane.

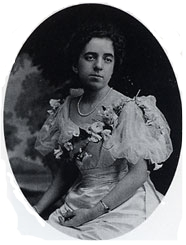
Anna Gould (1875-1961)

Prior to her societal debut, Miss Gould attended the Ogontz Seminary, a girls' school in the suburbs of Philadelphia. On March 14, 1895, she married Paul Ernest Boniface de Castellane (1867–1932), elder son and heir apparent of the Marquis of Castellane, in Manhattan, New York. He was commonly referred to as Boniface de Castellane with the nickname "Boni" and used the courtesy title of Count of Castellane (Comte de Castellane). Before their divorce, Boni and Anna had four children together:

- Marie Louise de Castellane (1896–1896), died in infancy
- Marie Louis Jean Jay Georges Paul Ernest Boniface, Marquis de Castellane (1897–1946), who married Yvonne Patenôtre, a daughter of Jules Patenôtre and Eleanor Elverson, the daughter of James Elverson, owner of The Philadelphia Inquirer.
- Georges Gustave Marie Antoine Boniface Charles de Castellane (1897–1944), who married Florinda Fernández Anchorena (1901-1995), owner, at that time, of the Fernández Anchorena Palace in Buenos Aires.
- Jason Honoré Louis Sever de Castellane (1902–1956)

They divorced in 1906, after Boniface had spent about $10 million of her family's money. Boniface then sought an annulment from the Vatican in 1924. After several appeals the validity of the marriage was upheld. On April 13, 1925, Time magazine wrote: "Probably not since Henry VIII tried in vain to get an annulment of his marriage with Catherine of Aragon has a matrimonial case been so long in the courts of the Roman Catholic Church as that on which nine Cardinals have just handed down a final decision."

In 1908, she married Boni's cousin Hélie de Talleyrand-Périgord, Duc de Sagan (1859–1937), son of the dandy Boson de Talleyrand-Périgord. As eldest son and heir to the Duke of Talleyrand, he was styled Marquis of Talleyrand-Périgord and Duke of Sagan. With Talleyrand, Anna had the following two children:

- Howard de Talleyrand-Périgord, Duc de Sagan (1909-1929), who took his own life when his parents refused him permission to marry until he was 21.
- Hélène Violette de Talleyrand-Périgord (1915-2003), who married Comte James Robert de Pourtalès on March 29, 1937, in Le Val-Saint-Germain. They divorced in 1969 and on March 20, 1969, she married Gaston Palewski (1901–1984), former Minister of Scientific Research, Atomic Energy and Space Questions. She had Issue.

She briefly traveled to the United States four months before her death and died on December 8, 1961, in Paris. She is entombed in Passy Cemetery in Paris.

=== Descendants ===
Anna was a grandmother to Elisabeth de Castellane (1928-1991), who married Jean Bertrand Jacques Adrien Nompar Comte de Caumont La Force (1920-1986) in Paris on December 7, 1948. She was also a grandmother to Diane Rose Anne Marie de Castellane (b. 1927), who married Philippe François Armand Marie Duc de Mouchy Prince-Duc de Poix (1922-2011) in Paris (civil ceremony) on April 14, 1948 (religious ceremony) on April 20, 1948. After having children, they divorced on March 13, 1974. Anna was also grandmother to Comte Hélie de Pourtalès who married as the second husband of Comtesse Marie-Eugénie de Witt, the eldest daughter of Princess Marie Clotilde Bonaparte.

== See also ==
- Jenny Jerome, an American who married the Lord Randolph Churchill
