= Hélie de Talleyrand-Périgord =

Hélie de Talleyrand-Périgord may refer to:

- Hélie de Talleyrand-Périgord (cardinal) (1301–1364), Catholic bishop in France, dean and archdeacon in England
- Hélie de Talleyrand-Périgord, Duke of Sagan (1859–1937) French socialite and noble
