= Sainte-Alvère =

- Part of Val de Louyre et Caudeau
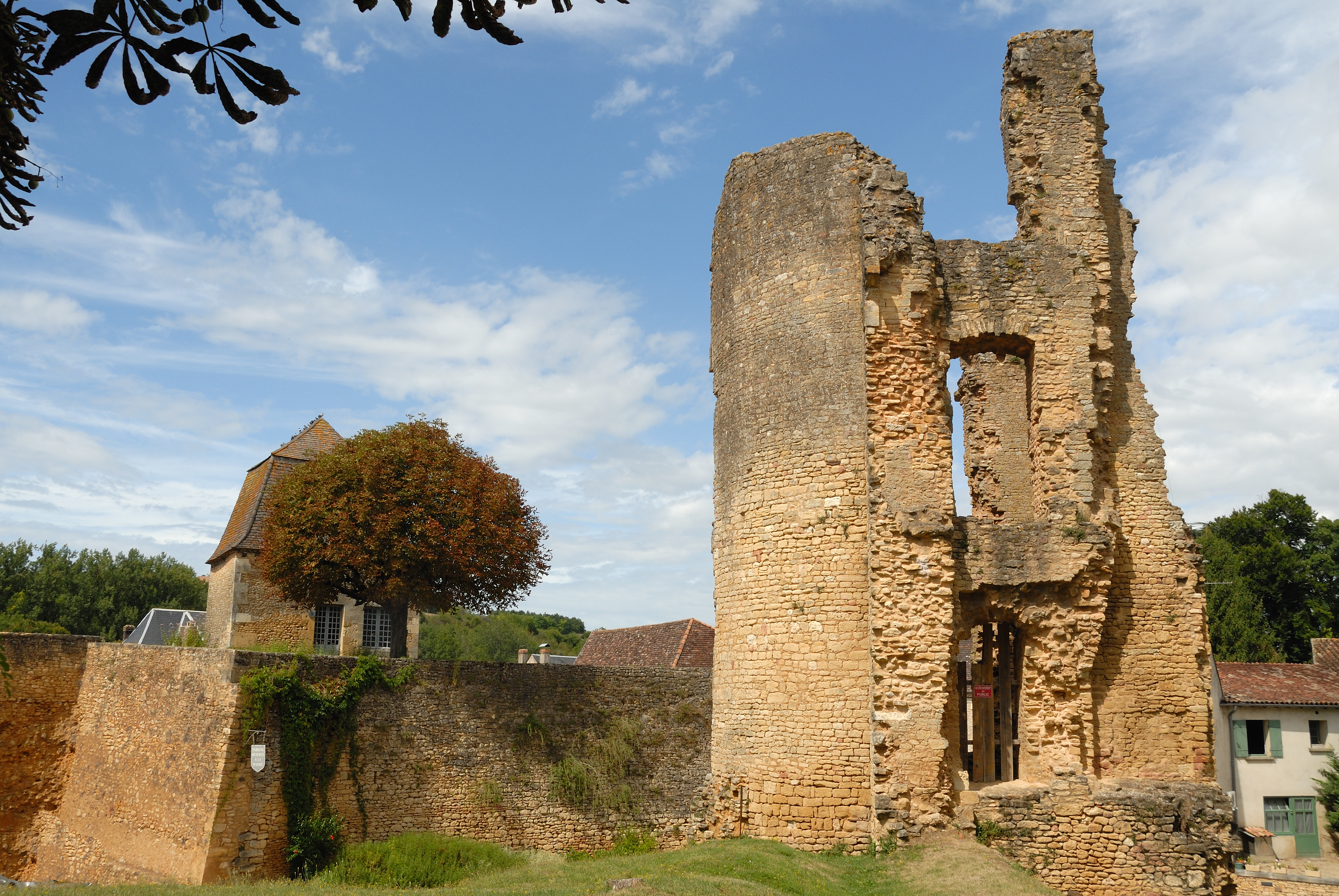

- Coat of arms
- Location of Sainte-Alvère
- Location within France Location within Nouvelle-Aquitaine
- Coordinates: 44°56′51″N 0°48′34″E
- Country: France
- Region: Nouvelle-Aquitaine
- Department: Dordogne
- Arrondissement: Périgueux
- Canton: Périgord central
- Commune: Val de Louyre et Caudeau
- Area^{1}: 32.42 km^{2} (12.52 sq mi)
- Elevation: 284 m (932 ft)
- Highest elevation: 251 m (823 ft)
- Lowest elevation: 105 m (344 ft)
- Population (2023): 777
  - Density: 24.0/km^{2} (62.1/sq mi)
- Time zone: UTC+01:00 (CET)
  - Summer (DST): UTC+02:00 (CEST)
- Postal code: 24510
- ^{1} French Land Register data, which excludes lakes, ponds, glaciers > 1 km^{2} (0.386 sq mi or 247 acres) and river estuaries.

Sainte-Alvère (French pronunciation: [sɛ̃t alvɛʁ]; Occitan: Senta Alvèra) is a town and former commune in the Dordogne department in southwestern France. On 1 January 2016, it was merged into the new commune Sainte-Alvère-Saint-Laurent Les Bâtons, which merged into the new commune Val de Louyre et Caudeau on 1 January 2017.

The remains of the Château de Sainte-Alvère are located in the town centre.

== See also ==
- Communes of the Dordogne department
