= Saint-Laurent-des-Bâtons =

- Part of Val de Louyre et Caudeau
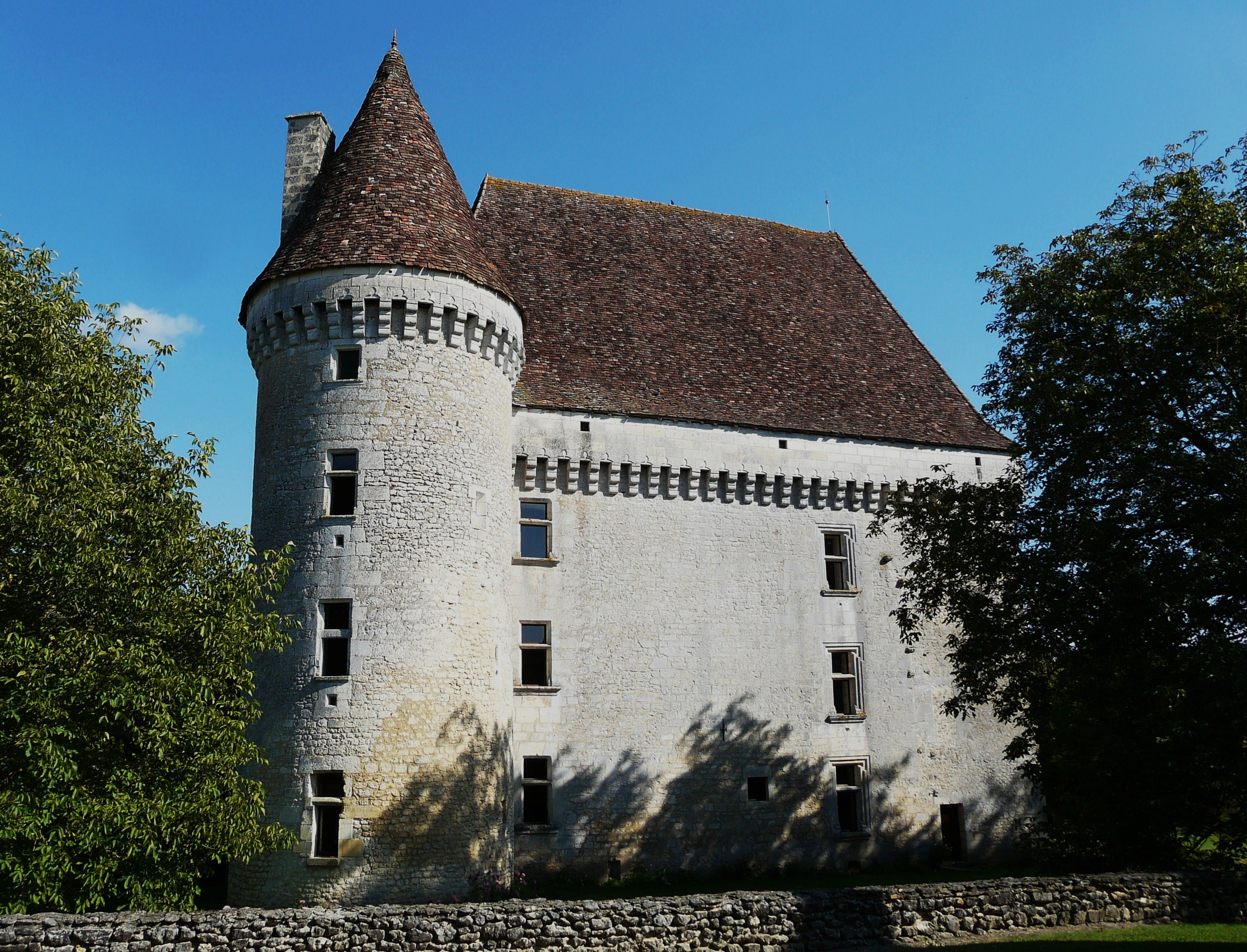
- Chateau Saint-Maurice
- Location of Saint-Laurent-des-Bâtons
- Location within France Location within Nouvelle-Aquitaine
- Coordinates: 44°57′34″N 0°44′19″E
- Country: France
- Region: Nouvelle-Aquitaine
- Department: Dordogne
- Arrondissement: Périgueux
- Canton: Périgord central
- Commune: Val de Louyre et Caudeau
- Area^{1}: 19.47 km^{2} (7.52 sq mi)
- Elevation: 146 m (479 ft)
- Highest elevation: 221 m (725 ft)
- Lowest elevation: 95 m (312 ft)
- Population (2023): 217
  - Density: 11.1/km^{2} (28.9/sq mi)
- Time zone: UTC+01:00 (CET)
  - Summer (DST): UTC+02:00 (CEST)
- Postal code: 24510
- ^{1} French Land Register data, which excludes lakes, ponds, glaciers > 1 km^{2} (0.386 sq mi or 247 acres) and river estuaries.

Saint-Laurent-des-Bâtons (French pronunciation: [sɛ̃ loʁɑ̃ de batɔ̃]; Occitan: Sent Laurenç deus Bastons) is a former commune in the Dordogne department in southwestern France. On 1 January 2016, it was merged into the new commune Sainte-Alvère-Saint-Laurent Les Bâtons, which merged into the new commune Val de Louyre et Caudeau on 1 January 2017.

== See also ==
- Communes of the Dordogne department
