= Sainte-Alvère-Saint-Laurent Les Bâtons =

- Part of Val de Louyre et Caudeau
- Location of Sainte-Alvère-Saint-Laurent Les Bâtons
- Location within France Location within Nouvelle-Aquitaine
- Coordinates: 44°56′46″N 0°48′32″E
- Country: France
- Region: Nouvelle-Aquitaine
- Department: Dordogne
- Arrondissement: Périgueux
- Canton: Périgord central
- Commune: Val de Louyre et Caudeau
- Area^{1}: 51.89 km^{2} (20.03 sq mi)
- Population (2016): 1,023
  - Density: 19.71/km^{2} (51.06/sq mi)
- Time zone: UTC+01:00 (CET)
  - Summer (DST): UTC+02:00 (CEST)
- Postal code: 24362
- ^{1} French Land Register data, which excludes lakes, ponds, glaciers > 1 km^{2} (0.386 sq mi or 247 acres) and river estuaries.

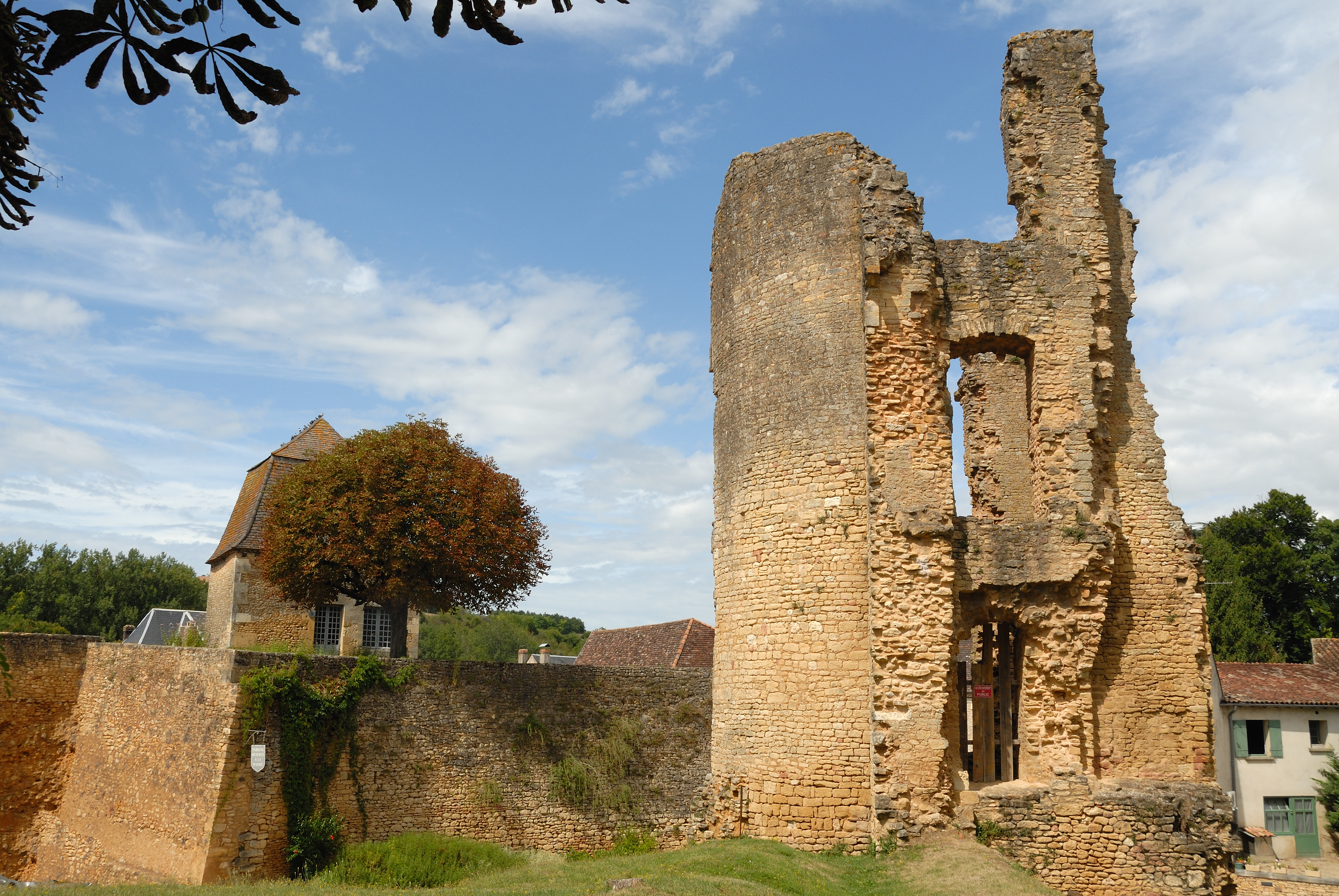

Sainte-Alvère-Saint-Laurent Les Bâtons (French pronunciation: [sɛ̃t alvɛʁ sɛ̃ loʁɑ̃ le batɔ̃]; Occitan: Senta Alvèra e Sent Laurenç deus Bastons) was a short-lived commune in the department of Dordogne, southwestern France. The commune was established on 1 January 2016 by merger of the former communes of Sainte-Alvère and Saint-Laurent-des-Bâtons. On 1 January 2017, it was merged into the new commune Val de Louyre et Caudeau.

== See also ==
- Communes of the Dordogne department
