= Léon Noël =

French diplomat, politician and historian

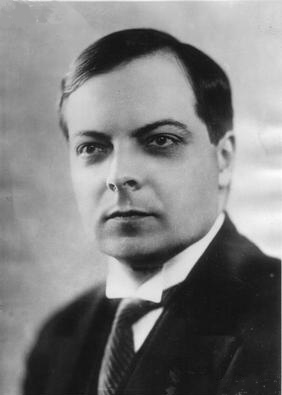

President of the Constitutional Council
- In office 5 March 1959 – 5 March 1965
- Appointed by: Charles de Gaulle
- Succeeded by: Gaston Palewski

Deputy for the RPF
- In office 1951–1955

French Ambassador in Poland
- In office 1935–1940

Plenipotentiary Minister in Prague
- In office 1932–1935

Prefect of Haut-Rhin
- In office 1930–1931

Délégué Général of the High Commissioner of the French Republic in Rhineland
- In office 1927–1930

Personal details
- Born: 28 March 1888 Paris, France
- Died: 6 August 1987 (aged 99) Toucy, France
- Education: Paris Law Faculty
- Profession: Lawyer; Diplomat
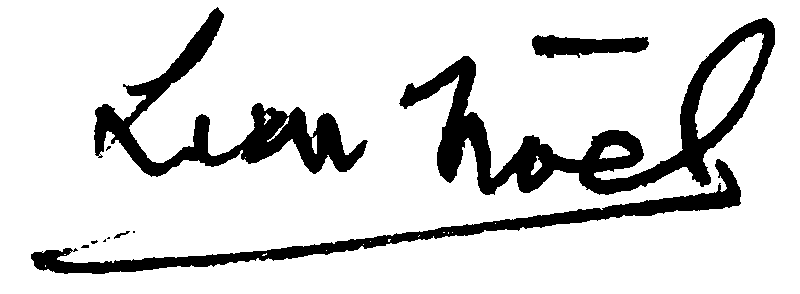
- Signature

Léon Philippe Jules Arthur Noël (28 March 1888 – 6 August 1987) was a French diplomat, politician and historian.

== Biography ==
He is the son of Jules Noël, conseiller d'Etat, and Cécile Burchard-Bélaváry. He received a Doctor of Laws in 1912 and then became Conseiller d'État. In 1927 he became Délégué Général of the High Commissioner of the French Republic in Rhineland.

He became Prefect of Haut-Rhin in 1930, Plenipotentiary Minister in Prague (1932–1935), and then French Ambassador to Poland (1935–1940).

He represented the French Minister of Foreign Affairs in the Second Armistice at Compiègne on 22 June 1940. He was named delegate general in the territories occupied on 9 July 1940. Ten days later he resigned, and he joined de Gaulle in 1943. He is member (1944) next president of French Academy of Moral and Political Sciences (1958).

He was a Member of the French Parliament (RPF) (1951–1955).

He was the first President of the Constitutional Council of France (1959–1965).

== Distinctions ==
- Grand'croix of the Légion d'honneur
- Grand'croix of the Ordre national du Mérite
- Krzyż Wielki (Grand cross) of the Polonia Restituta
- Grand'croix of the Order of the White Lion
- Knight of the Ordre des Palmes Académiques

...

== Bibliography ==
- Léon Noël, L'agression allemande contre la Pologne, Flammarion, 1946.
- Collectif, In memoriam Léon Noël (1888–1987), Bulletin de la Société des Sciences Historiques et Naturelles de l'Yonne, 1987, p. 5-8.
- Yves Beauvois, Léon Noël, de Laval à de Gaulle, via Pétain, Presses universitaires du Septentrion, 2001
- Id., « Le Conseil constitutionnel à ses débuts », Commentaire, hiver 2006-2007, p. 943-954

Legal offices
New title	President of the Constitutional Council; 1959–1965	Succeeded by Gaston Palewski
