= Château de la Pommerie =

Château in Nouvelle-Aquitaine, France

Coordinates: 44°58′28″N 0°50′13″E

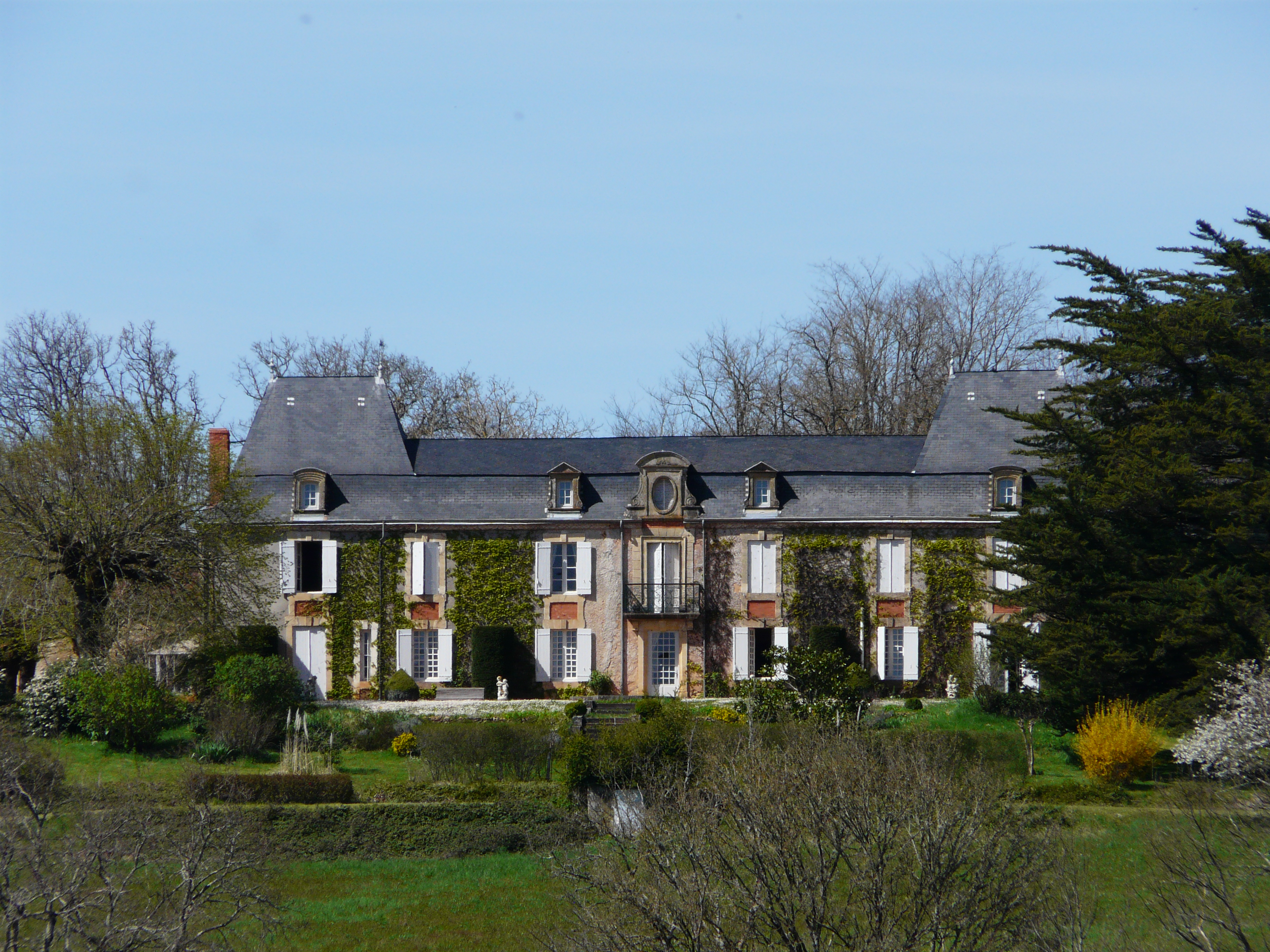

The Château de la Pommerie is a château in the commune of Val de Louyre et Caudeau (formerly Cendrieux), Dordogne, Nouvelle-Aquitaine, France. It was listed as a monument historique in 2002. Since 1999 it has accommodated a museum about Napoleon I and his times.
