= Boson de Talleyrand-Périgord =

French nobleman (1832–1910)

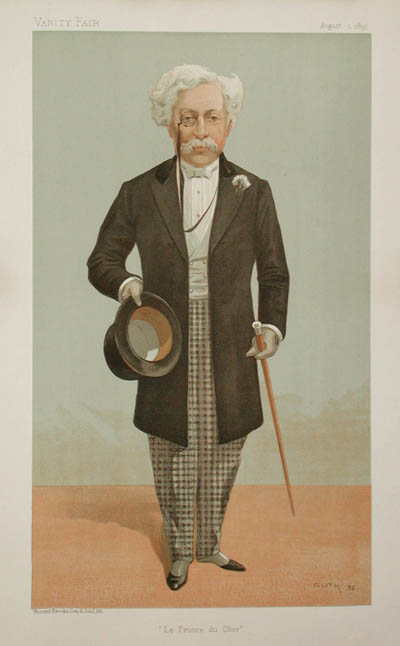
- Picture of Talleyrand, 1910
- Born: Charles Guillaume Frédéric Boson de Talleyrand-Périgord; May 16, 1832; Auteuil, Paris, France
- Died: February 21, 1910 (aged 77); Paris, France
- Spouse: Jeanne Seillière (m. 1858; died 1905)
- Children: Hélie de Talleyrand-Périgord, Boson II de Talleyrand-Périgord
- Parent(s): Napoléon Louis de Talleyrand-Périgord; Anne Louise Charlotte Alix de Montmorency

Charles Guillaume Frédéric Boson de Talleyrand-Périgord (16 May 1832 – 21 February 1910), prince of Sagan (from 1845), duke of Sagan and duke of Talleyrand (from 1898) was a famous French dandy, and the grandson of Dorothea von Biron.

== Early life ==
He was the son of Napoléon Louis, III. duc de Talleyrand-Périgord (1811-1898) and Anne Louise Charlotte Alix de Montmorency (1810-1858). His paternal grandparents were Alexandre de Talleyrand-Périgord, Duke of Dino (1787–1872) and later duc de Talleyrand-Périgord, and of Dorothea of Courland, Duchess of Sagan (1793–1862). His maternal grandfather was the Duke of Montmorency.

== Career ==
A cavalry officer, he was one of the major figures in French high society in the second half of the 19th century. Boni de Castellane wrote of him:

A cabotin, brave, amiable, high but without airs-and-graces, he had a supreme elegance, with the air of a grand seigneur, but with a certain something of the actor Gil-Pérès. Quite diplomatic, very ignorant, without taste for things of value, he was full of a "chic" which showed itself in all his sounds, gestures, poses and even the black band of his spectacles. He excelled in the art of paying homage to women who showed themselves attentive to him, like a cat, without good-faith or law. He reigned in Paris over a crowd of personalities from the "grand monde", just as over more dubious people. A prince as well as a prince of fashion, he held the titles of peer of France and compère of the revue.

=== Peerage ===
In 1898, upon the death of his father, he succeeded to his father's titles, becoming His Serene Highness, the 4th Duke of Talleyrand and Herzog zu Sagan. On 10 July 1912, he was confirmed as the 5th Duke of Dino by King Victor Emmanuel III of Italy. After his death, his titles passed to his son, Hélie de Talleyrand-Périgord, Duke of Sagan.

== Personal life ==
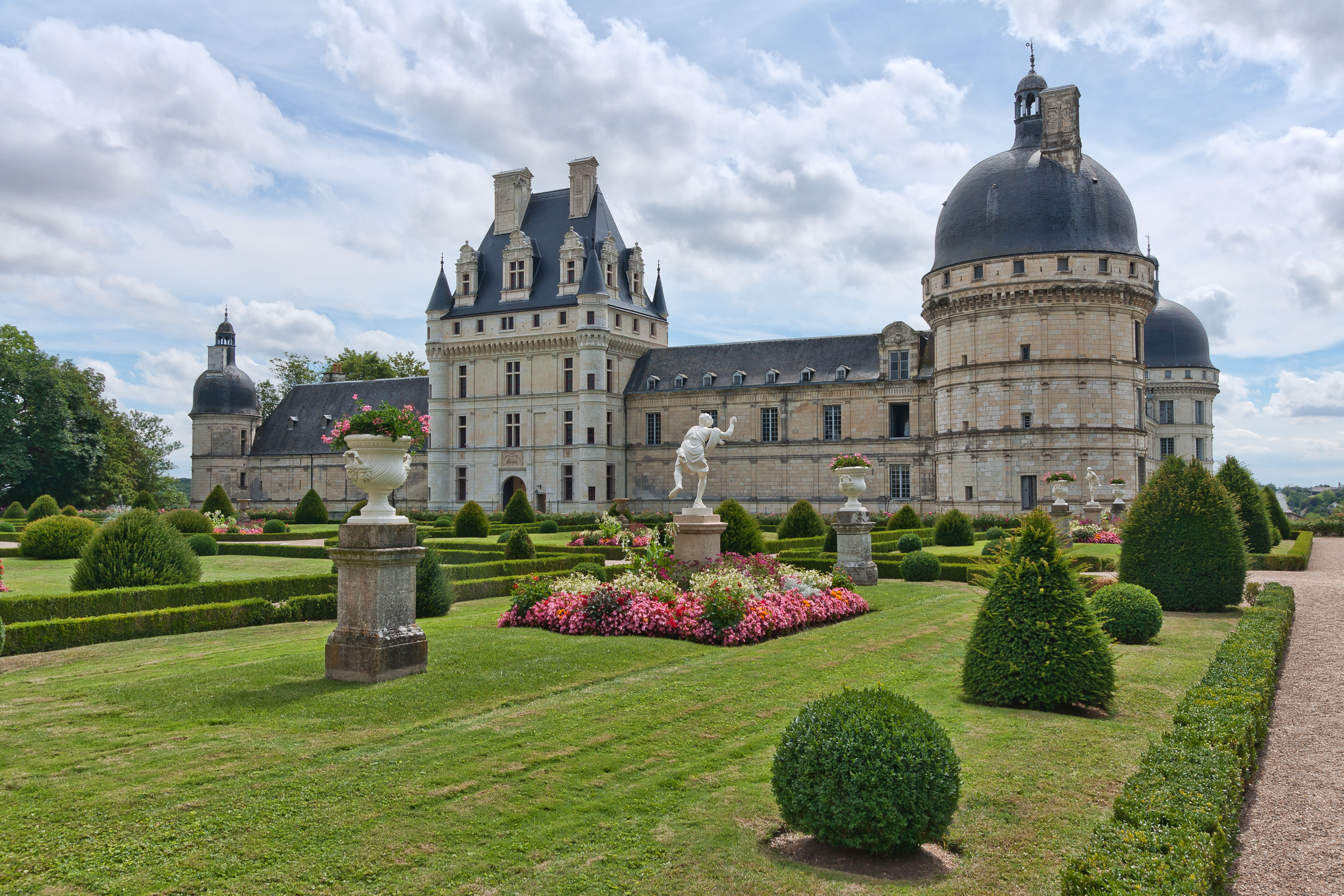
Château de Valençay, Duke de Talleyrand-Périgord's property

In 1858, he married Jeanne Seillière (1839-1905), the heiress to Baron de Seilliere, army supply contractor who had enriched himself during the Franco-Prussian War. Together, they had two children:

- Marie Pierre Camille Louis Hélie de Talleyrand-Périgord, 5th Duke of Talleyrand (1859-1937), who married Anna Gould. She was previously married to Hélie's cousin Boni de Castellane from 1895 to 1906.
- Paul Louis Marie Archambault Boson de Talleyrand-Périgord, a.k.a. "Duke de Valençay", 5th Duke of Talleyrand (1867-1952), who married Helen Stuyvesant Morton (1876–1952), daughter of former U.S. Vice President Levi P. Morton. They divorced in 1904.

Talleyrand died on 21 February 1910.

French nobility
| Preceded by Napoléon-Louis de Talleyrand-Périgord | Duke of Talleyrand and Dino; 1898–1910 | Succeeded by Marie Pierre Camille Louis Hélie de Talleyrand-Périgord |
