= Cendrieux =

- Part of Val de Louyre et Caudeau
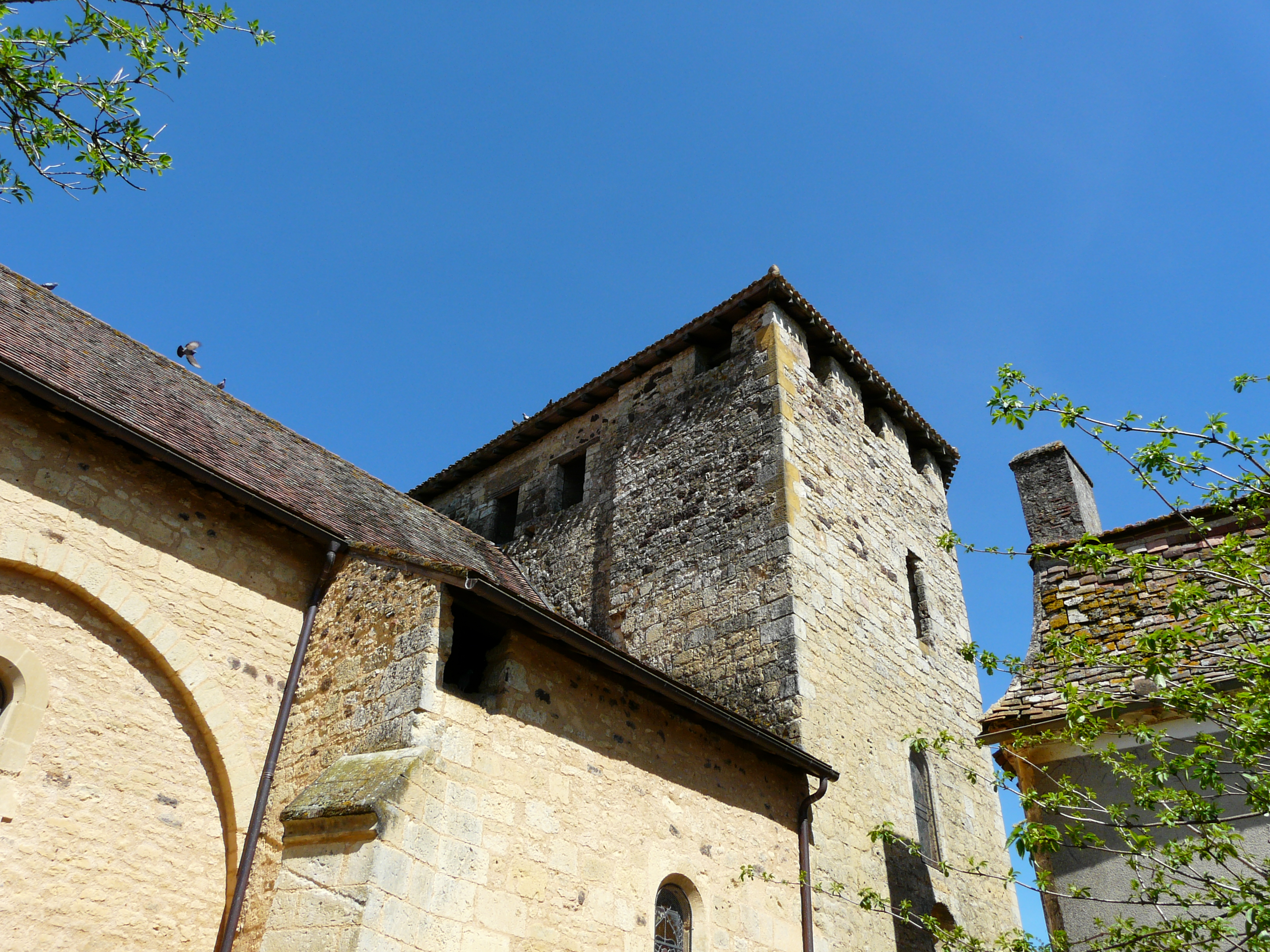
- Location of Cendrieux
- Location within France Location within Nouvelle-Aquitaine
- Coordinates: 44°59′49″N 0°49′25″E
- Country: France
- Region: Nouvelle-Aquitaine
- Department: Dordogne
- Arrondissement: Périgueux
- Canton: Périgord Central
- Commune: Val de Louyre et Caudeau
- Area^{1}: 30.23 km^{2} (11.67 sq mi)
- Elevation: 226 m (741 ft)
- Highest elevation: 263 m (863 ft)
- Lowest elevation: 150 m (490 ft)
- Population (2023): 591
  - Density: 19.6/km^{2} (50.6/sq mi)
- Time zone: UTC+01:00 (CET)
  - Summer (DST): UTC+02:00 (CEST)
- Postal code: 24380
- ^{1} French Land Register data, which excludes lakes, ponds, glaciers > 1 km^{2} (0.386 sq mi or 247 acres) and river estuaries.

Cendrieux (French pronunciation: [sɑ̃dʁijø]; Occitan: Sendrius) is a former commune in the Dordogne department, Nouvelle-Aquitaine, southwestern France. On 1 January 2017, it was merged into the new commune Val de Louyre et Caudeau.

== Monuments ==
- Château de la Pommerie

== See also ==
- Communes of the Dordogne department
