= Hélie de Talleyrand-Périgord, Duke of Sagan =

French socialite

Hélie de Talleyrand-Périgord
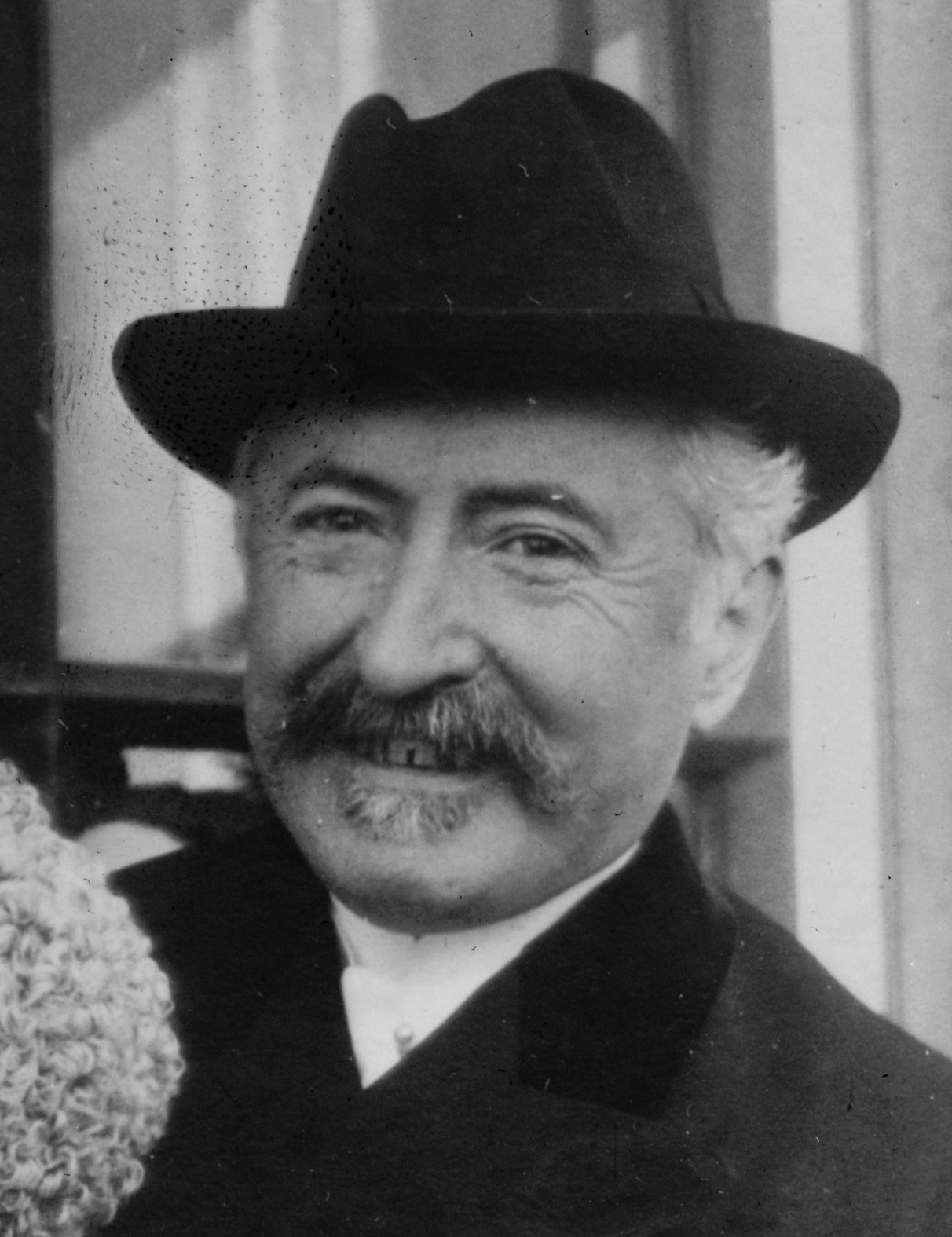
- Born: Marie Pierre Camille Louis Hélie de Talleyrand-Périgord; August 23, 1859; Mello, Oise, France
- Died: October 25, 1937 (aged 78); Paris, France
- Spouse: Anna Gould (m. 1908)
- Children: Howard de Talleyrand; Hélène Violette de Talleyrand
- Parent(s): Boson de Talleyrand-Périgord; Jeanne Seillière

Marie Pierre Louis Hélie de Talleyrand-Périgord (August 23, 1859 – October 25, 1937), 5th Duke of Talleyrand and Dino, Prince, then Duke of Sagan, was a French socialite and son of Boson de Talleyrand-Périgord.

== Early life ==
Talleyrand was born on August 23, 1859, to Boson de Talleyrand-Périgord, the 4th Duke of Talleyrand (1832-1910) and Jeanne Seillière (1839-1905), the heiress to Baron de Seilliere, army supply contractor who had enriched himself during the Franco-Prussian War. His younger brother was Boson de Talleyrand-Périgord (1867-1952), duc de Valençay.

His paternal grandparents were Napoléon Louis, III. duc de Talleyrand-Périgord (1811-1898) and Anne Louise Charlotte Alix de Montmorency (1810-1858). His paternal great-grandparents were Alexandre de Talleyrand-Périgord, Duke of Dino (1787–1872) and later duc de Talleyrand-Périgord, and Dorothea of Courland, Duchess of Sagan (1793–1862). Another great-grandfather was the Duke of Montmorency.

=== Peerage ===
In 1910, upon the death of his father, he succeeded to his father's titles, becoming His Serene Highness, the 5th Duke of Talleyrand and Herzog zu Sagan. On 10 July 1912, he was confirmed as the 5th Duke of Dino by Victor Emmanuel III, the King of Italy. After his death, his titles passed to his younger brother, as his only son predeceased him.

== Personal life ==
In 1908, he married Countess Anna de Castellane (1875–1961). Anna was the daughter of Jay Gould (1836–1892), an American railroad developer who has been referred to as one of the ruthless robber barons of the Gilded Age. Anna was the sister of George Jay Gould I, Edwin Gould I, Helen Miller Gould, Howard Gould, and Frank Jay Gould. She had previously married (1895-1906) to his cousin, Comte Boni de Castellane, later Marquis de Castellane. They had the following children:

- Howard de Talleyrand, Prince of Sagan (1909–1929), who took his own life on May 28, 1929.
- Hélène Violette de Talleyrand (1915–2003), who married James Robert de Pourtalès on March 29, 1937, in Le Val-Saint-Germain. They divorced in 1969, and on March 20, 1969, she married Gaston Palewski (1901–1984), the Minister of Scientific Research and Atomic and Space Questions from 1962 to 1966. They married in Paris. She had Issue.

Their son, Howard, took his own life on May 28, 1929, at his parents’ home in Paris when told he could not marry. He was taken to a hospital on Rue Puccini, where he died. His parents thought at the age of 19, he was too young to marry. Hélie and Anna said: "... we had no objection to the girl, but only opposed the marriage because of our son's age."

Talleyrand died on October 25, 1937, of a heart attack in Paris.

=== Descendants ===
He was the grandfather of Hélie Alfred Gérard de Pourtalès (b. 1938) who married, as his second wife, Marie Eugénie de Witt (b. 1939), the eldest daughter of Princess Marie Clotilde Bonaparte.

== See also ==
- House of Talleyrand-Périgord

French nobility
Preceded by Charles Guillaume; Frédéric Boson	Duke of Talleyrand and Dino; 1910–1937	Succeeded by Paul Louis Marie; Archambault Boson
