= Val de Louyre et Caudeau =

- Commune
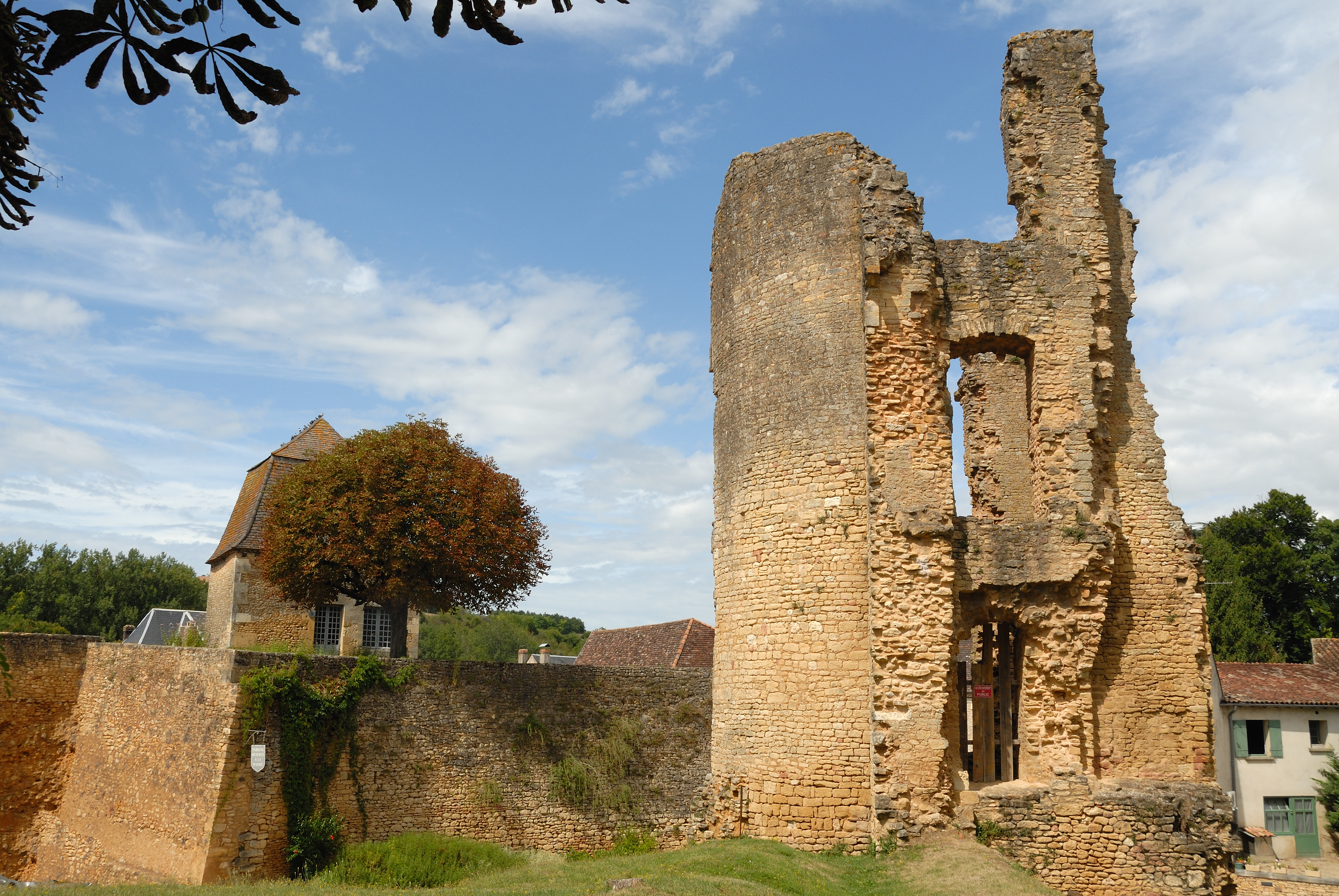
- Lostanges castle ruins in Sainte-Alvère
- Location of Val de Louyre et Caudeau
- Location within France Location within Nouvelle-Aquitaine
- Coordinates: 44°56′49″N 0°48′32″E
- Country: France
- Region: Nouvelle-Aquitaine
- Department: Dordogne
- Arrondissement: Périgueux
- Canton: Périgord central
- Intercommunality: Le Grand Périgueux
- Area^{1}: 82.12 km^{2} (31.71 sq mi)
- Population (2023): 1,585
  - Density: 19.30/km^{2} (49.99/sq mi)
- Time zone: UTC+01:00 (CET)
  - Summer (DST): UTC+02:00 (CEST)
- INSEE/Postal code: 24362 /24510
- ^{1} French Land Register data, which excludes lakes, ponds, glaciers > 1 km^{2} (0.386 sq mi or 247 acres) and river estuaries.

Val de Louyre et Caudeau (Occitan: Vallée de Louyre e Caudeau) is a commune in the department of Dordogne, southwestern France. It was established on 1 January 2017 by the merger of the former communes of Cendrieux and Sainte-Alvère-Saint-Laurent Les Bâtons. Sainte-Alvère-Saint-Laurent Les Bâtons was the result of the merger of the communes of Sainte-Alvère and Saint-Laurent-des-Bâtons on 1 January 2016.

In 2021, the comune had 1,590 inhabitants.

The most important towns located in the commune are Cendrieux, Saint-Laurent-des-Bâtons and Sainte-Alvère. There are also several other small villages and hamlets.

== See also ==
- Communes of the Dordogne department
