= Le Val-Saint-Germain =

Commune in Île-de-France, France

- Commune
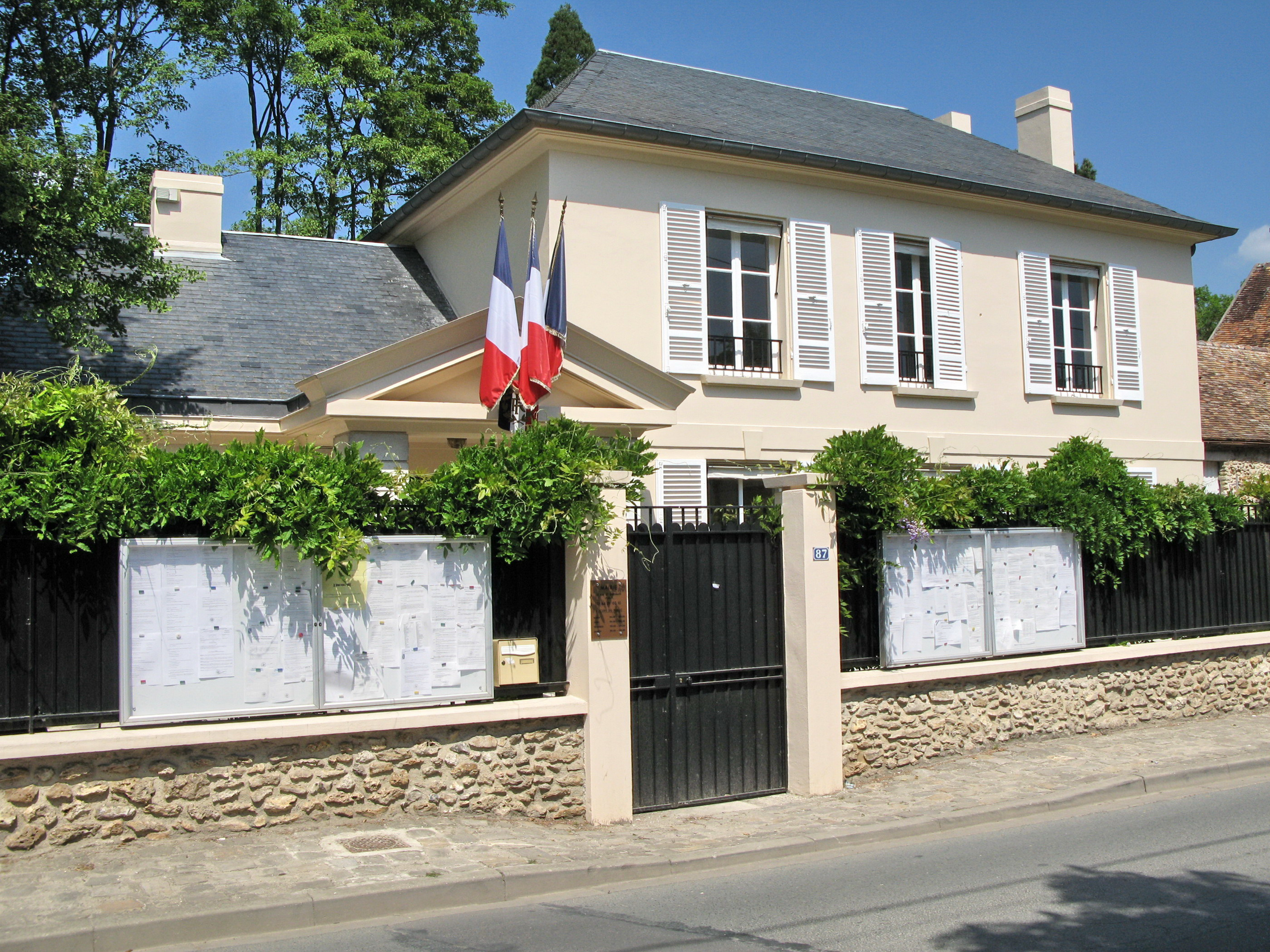
- The town hall of Le Val-Saint-Germain

- Coat of arms
- Location of Le Val-Saint-Germain
- Location within France Location within Île-de-France (region)
- Coordinates: 48°33′56″N 2°03′36″E
- Country: France
- Region: Île-de-France
- Department: Essonne
- Arrondissement: Étampes
- Canton: Dourdan
- Intercommunality: CC Le Dourdannais en Hurepoix

Government
  - Mayor (2020–2026): Serge Deloges
- Area^{1}: 12.57 km^{2} (4.85 sq mi)
- Highest elevation: 159 m (522 ft)
- Lowest elevation: 62 m (203 ft)
- Population (2023): 1,576
  - Density: 125.4/km^{2} (324.7/sq mi)
- Demonym: Val-Saint-Germinois
- Time zone: UTC+01:00 (CET)
  - Summer (DST): UTC+02:00 (CEST)
- INSEE/Postal code: 91630 /91530
- Website: le-val-saint-germain.fr
- ^{1} French Land Register data, which excludes lakes, ponds, glaciers > 1 km^{2} (0.386 sq mi or 247 acres) and river estuaries.

Le Val-Saint-Germain (French pronunciation: [lə val sɛ̃ ʒɛʁmɛ̃]) is a commune in the Essonne department in Île-de-France in Northern France. It is best known for its 18th-century Château du Marais by Jean-Benoît-Vincent Barré, built from 1772 to 1779 in Louis XVI style. Both the château and town church are featured on the town's coat of arms.

Inhabitants of Le Val-Saint-Germain are known as Val-Saint-Germinois (masculine) and Val-Saint-Germinoises (feminine) in French.

== Gallery ==
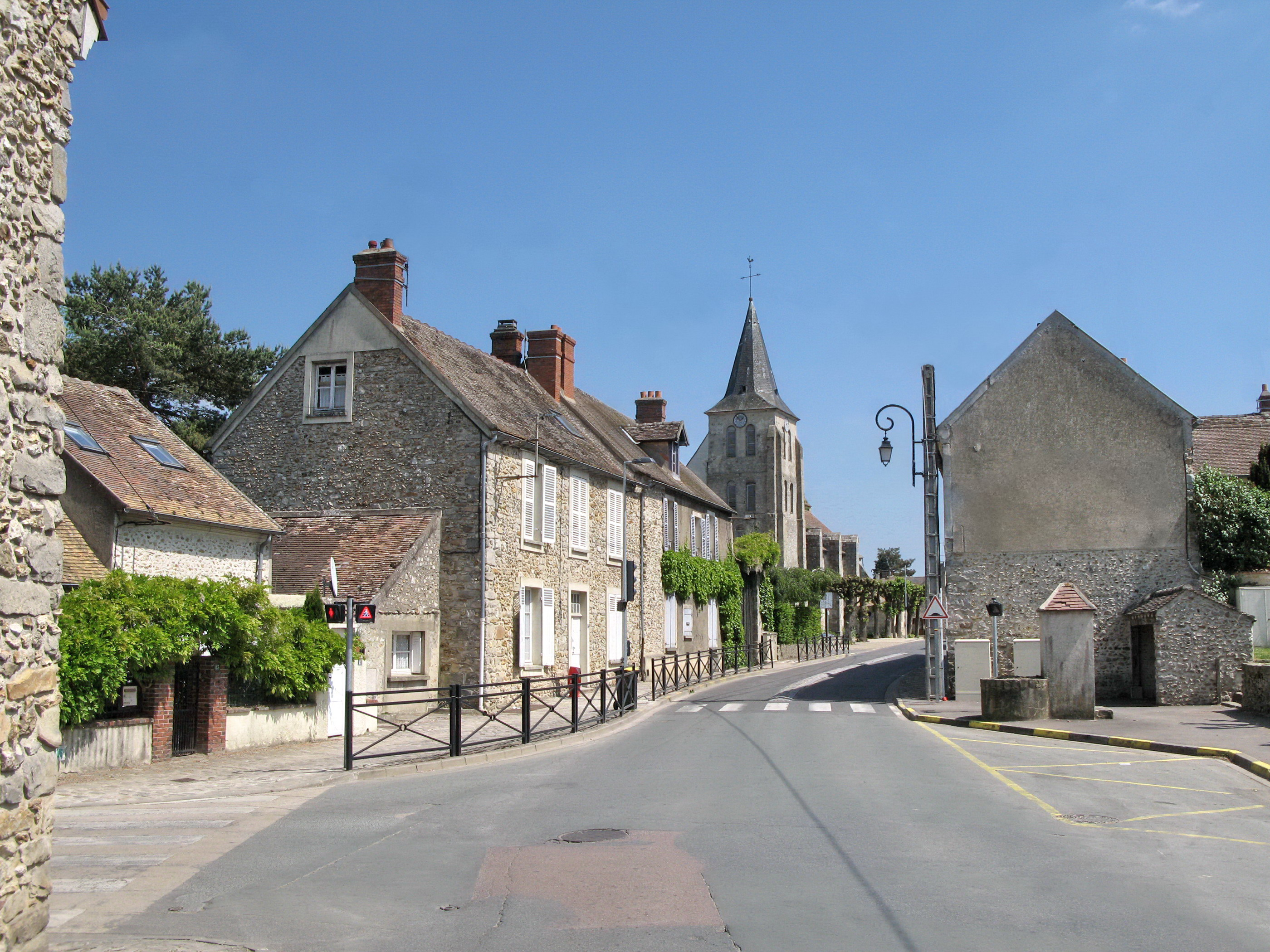
Town centre and Église Saint-Germain-de-Paris

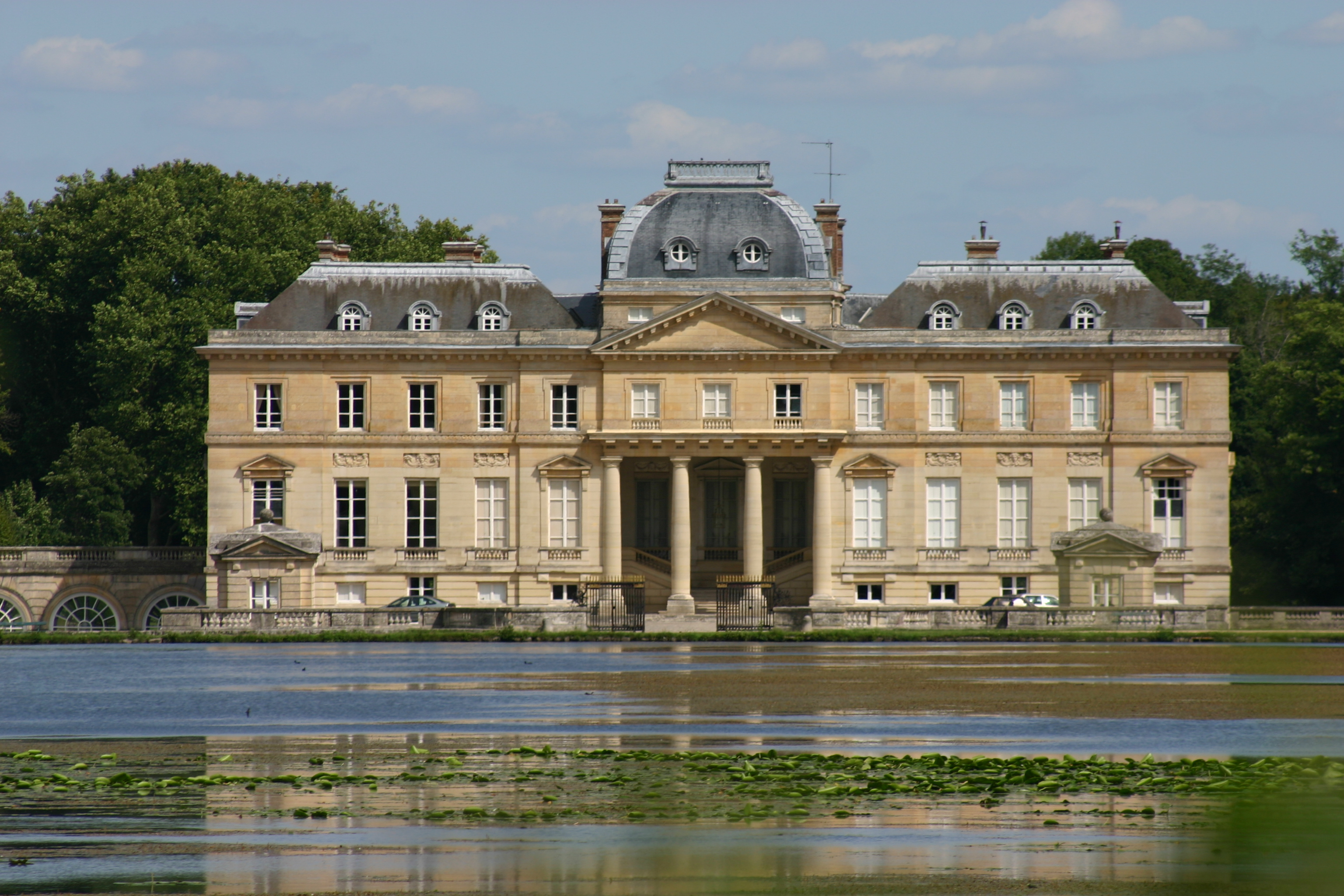
Château du Marais

== See also ==
- Communes of the Essonne department
