= House of Talleyrand-Périgord =

French noble house

House of Talleyrand-Périgord Maison de Talleyrand-Périgord
- Noble family
- Country: Kingdom of France
- Founded: 845
- Founder: Boson I de la Marche
- Titles: Duke of Talleyrand; Duke of Dino; Duke of Sagan; Prince of Benevento; Count of Périgord; Count of La Marche (ex)
- Estate: Château de Valençay
- Dissolution: 2003

The House of Talleyrand-Périgord (pronounced [talɛjʁɑ̃peʁiɡɔʁ]) is an ancient French noble house. A well-known member of this family was Charles Maurice de Talleyrand-Périgord (1754–1838), who achieved distinction as a French statesman and diplomat. The family name became extinct in 2003 upon the death of Violette de Talleyrand-Périgord.

== Origins ==
A cadet branch of the family of sovereign counts of Périgord, they took their name from the estate of Périgord owned by these counts, and date back to Boso I, Count of la Marche. The first to have borne this name was Hélie de Talleyrand, who lived around 1100.

Their motto was "Re que Diou" (an Old French dialectal form for "Nothing But God"): their ancestor was one of the great men of the kingdom of France, and participated in the election of Hugh Capet as King of France. An anecdote reports that Capet asked Boson "Mais qui donc t'as fait comte?" ("But who then made you a count?") to which he replied "Ceux là même qui t'ont fait Roi" ("The same ones who made you King"). The Périgords considered their entitlements to emanate from the same power that entitled the French kings themselves to govern, divine right of civil authority being a cornerstone of most Christian doctrine emanating from the Bible since the earliest days.

== Notable family members ==
- Hélie de Talleyrand-Périgord (1301–1364), a Cardinal and Bishop of Auxerre
- Henri de Talleyrand-Périgord (1599–1626), Count of Chalais
- Alexandre Angélique de Talleyrand-Périgord (1736–1821), a Cardinal and Archbishop of Paris
- Charles Maurice de Talleyrand-Périgord (1754–1838), Prince of Bénévent and later Prince of Talleyrand
- Hélie de Talleyrand-Périgord, Duc de Sagan (1859–1937), Prince and Duke of Sagan

== First branch ==
 Augustin Marie Elie Charles (1788- ), duc de Périgord
 x (1807) Marie de Choiseul-Praslin (1789–1866)
 │
 ├──> Elie Roger Louis (born 1809), prince de Chalais
 │    x Elodie de Beauvilliers de Saint-Aignan (d. 1835)
 │
 └──> Paul Adalbert René (born 1811), comte de Périgord
      x Amicie Rousseau de Saint-Aignan (d. 1854)
      │
      └──> Cécile Marie (08.01.1854-11.12.1890 à Pau)
           x 10.05.1873 Gaston marquis de Brassac, prince de Béarn
           (source dates: page de garde du Formulaire de Prières de la princesse Cécile)
           │
           └──> Blanche (source: idem)
                Henri prince de Béarn et autres: voir                 https://web.archive.org/web/20080111075617/http://web.genealogie.free.fr/Les_dynasties/Les_dynasties_celebres/France/Dynastie_de_Galard_de_Bearn.htm

== Second branch ==
 Alexandre Edmond (1787–1872), 2nd duc de Talleyrand
 x (1809) Dorothée de Courlande (1793–1862), duchesse de Dino, duchesse de Sagan
 │
 ├──> Napoléon Louis (1811–1898), 3rd duc de Talleyrand
 │    x (1829) Anne Louise Alix de Montmorency (1810–1858)
 │    │ │
 │    │ ├──> Caroline Valentine (1830–1913)
 │    │ │    x (1852) Vicomte Charles Henri d'Etchegoyen (1818–1885)
 │    │ │
 │    │ ├──> Charles Guillaume Frédéric Boson (1832–1910), duc de Sagan, 4th duc de Talleyrand
 │    │ │    x (1858) Anne Alexandrine Jeanne Marguerite Seillière (1839–1905)
 │    │ │    │
 │    │ │    ├──> Marie Pierre Camille Louis Hély (1859–1937), prince et duc de Sagan
 │    │ │    │    x (1908) Anna Gould (1875–1961)
 │    │ │    │    │
 │    │ │    │    ├──> Howard (1909–1929), duc de Sagan
 │    │ │    │    │
 │    │ │    │    └──> Helen Violette (1915–2003)
 │    │ │    │         x (1937) Comte James de Pourtalès (1911- )
 │    │ │    │         │
 │    │ │    │         x Gaston Palewski (1901–1984) 
 │    │ │    │
 │    │ │    └──> Paul Louis Marie Archambault Boson (1867–1952), duc de Valençay
 │    │ │         x (1) Helen Stuyvesant Morton (1876– )
 │    │ │         x (2) Silvia Victoria Rodriguez de Rivas de Castilleja de Guzman (1909– )
 │    │ │         x (3) Antoinette Marie Joséphine Morel (1909– )
 │    │ │
 │    │ ├──> Marie Pauline Yolande (1833- )
 │    │ │
 │    │ └──> Nicolas Raoul Adalbert (1837–1915), duc de Montmorency (1864)
 │    │      x (1866) Ida Marie Carmen Aguado y MacDonnel (1847–1880)
 │    │      │
 │    │      └──> Napoléon Louis Eugène Alexandre Anne Emmanuel (1867–1951)
 │    │           x (1) Marie-Joséphine-Henriette-Anne de Rohan-Chabot (1873–1903) (see House of Rohan-Chabot)
 │    │           x (2) Cecilia (née Ulman) Blumenthal (1863–1927)
 │    │           x (3) Gabrielle-Ida (née Lefaivre) Grandjean (1896–1985)
 │    │
 │    x (1861) Rachel Elisabeth Pauline de Castellane (1823–1895) (see House of Castellane)
 │      │
 │      └──> Marie Dorothée Louise Valençay (1862–1948)
 │           x (1) (1881) Charles Egon IV, Prince of Fürstenberg
 │           │
 │           x (2) (1898) Jean de Castellane (1868–1965) (see House of Castellane)
 │
 ├──> Alexandre Edmond (1813–1894), 3rd duc de Dino (1838), marquis de Talleyrand
 │    x (1839) Marie Valentine Joséphine de Sainte-Aldegonde (1820–1891)
 │    │
 │    ├──> Clémentine Marie Wilhelmine (1841–1881)
 │    │    x (1860) Comte Alexandre Orlowski (1816–1893)
 │    │       dont postérité
 │    │
 │    ├──> Charles Maurice Camille (1843–1917), 4th duc de Dino, 2nd marquis de Talleyrand
 │    │    x (1) (1867) Elizabeth Beers-Curtis (1847-1933)
 │    │       │
 │    │       └──> Pauline Marie Palma (1871–1952)
 │    │            x (1890) Mario Ruspoli, 2nd Prince of Poggio Suasa (1867–1963)
 │    │              dont postérité
 │    │
 │    ├──> Elisabeth Alexandrine Florence (1844–1880)
 │    │    x (1863) Comte Hans d'Oppersdorff (1832–1877)
 │    │      dont postérité
 │    │
 │    └──> Archambaud Anatole Paul (1845–1918), 3rd marquis de Talleyrand
 │         x (1876) Marie de Gontaut-Biron (1847- )
 │         │
 │         ├──> Anne-Hélène (1877–1945)
 │         │    x (1907) Édouard Dreyfus y Gonzalez, comte, then duc de Premio Real (1876–1941)
 │         │      dont postérité
 │         │
 │         ├──> Félicie (1878–1981)
 │         │    x (1907) Louis Dreyfus y Gonzalez, marquis de Villahermosa (1874–1965)
 │         │      dont postérité
 │         │
 │         ├──> Hély (1882–1968), 4th marquis de Talleyrand, 7th duc de Talleyrand et Dino,
 │         │    6th duc de Sagan (1952) 20 Mar 1968)
 │         │    x (1938) Lela Emery (1902-1962)
 │         │
 │         └──> Alexandre (1883–1925), comte de Talleyrand
 │              x (1914) Anne-Marie Röhr
 │                sans postérité
 │
 └──> Joséphine Pauline (1820–1890) (disputed paternity)
      x (1839) Henri de Castellane (1814–1847) (see House of Castellane)

== Third branch ==
 │ 
 ├──>   Auguste (d. 1832), comte de Talleyrand-Périgord, peer of France
 │      x Caroline d'Argy (d. 1847)
 │      │ 
 │      ├──> Louis Marie (born 1810), comte de Talleyrand-Périgord
 │      │    x (1839) Stéphanie de Pomereu (1819–1855)
 │      │    │
 │      │    x (1868) Marie-Thérèse de Brossin (1838- )
 │      │
 │      └──> Ernest (1807–1871)
 │           x Marie Louise Lepelletier de Morfontaine (1811- )
 │           │
 │           └──> Marie Louise Marguerite (1832- )
 │                x (1851) Prince Henri de Ligne
 │
 │ 
 └──>   Alexandre Daniel (1776–1839), baron de Talleyrand-Périgord, peer of France (1838)
        x Charlotte Elisabeth Alix Sara (illegitimate daughter of Prince Charles Maurice de Talleyrand-Périgord and Mme Grand)
        │ 
        ├──> "Charles Angélique  (1821–1896), baron de Talleyrand-Périgord, senator
        │    x (1862) Véra de Bernardaky
        │    │ 
        │    ├──> Marie Marguerite (1863- )
        │    │
        │    └──> ? (1867- )
        │
        ├──> Marie-Thérèse (1824- )
        │    x (1842) Jean Stanley of Huggerston-Hall
        │
        └──> Louis Alexis Adalbert (1826–1873)
             x (1868) Marguerite Yvelin de Béville (1840- )
             │ 
             ├──> Charlotte Louise Marie-Thèrèse (1869- )
             │
             └──> Charlotte Louise Marie Adalberte (1873- )
