= Château de Beauregard =

Château de Beauregard may refer to:

- Château de Beauregard, a castle in La Celle-Saint-Cloud, Paris, in the département of Yvelines
- Château de Beauregard, in Cellettes, in the Loire Valley
- Château de Beauregard, in Beauregard-l'Évêque in the département of Puy-de-Dôme
- Château de Beauregard, in Chens-sur-Léman over the Lake Léman, in the département of Haute-Savoie
- Château de Beauregard, in Juillac-le-Coq, in the département of Charente
- Château de Beauregard, in Mareuil, in the département of Dordogne
- Château de Beauregard, in Mons in the département of Var
- Château de Beauregard, in Saint-Jean-de-Beauregard, in the south suburbs of Paris, in the département of Essonnes
- Château de Beauregard, in Saint-Jeoire-en-Faucigny, in the département of Haute-Savoie
- Château de Beauregard (Isère) in Seyssinet-Pariset, Isère, France

== See also ==
- Château Beauregard, a Pomerol winery
- Beauregard (disambiguation)
