= Beauregard =

Beauregard or Beauregarde may refer to:

== People ==
- Beauregarde (wrestler) (1936–2024), ring name of American wrestler Larry Pitchford
- Charles Costa de Beauregard (1835–1909), French historian and politician
- Christopher Beauregard Emery (born 1957), American White House Usher, enterprise architect, and author
- DJ Paul (born 1975), American rapper born Paul Beauregard
- Élie Beauregard (1884–1954), Canadian lawyer and politician
- Georges de Beauregard (1920–1984), French producer
- Gilbert de Beauregard Robinson (1906–1992), Canadian mathematician
- James Beauregard-Smith (fl. late 20th century), Australian life prisoner
- Jean-Nicolas Beauregard (1733–1804), French-born religious leader
- Keith Beauregard (born 1983), American baseball coach
- Nathan Beauregard (1887–1970), American musician
- Olivier Costa de Beauregard (1911–2007), French relativistic and quantum physicist,
- P. G. T. Beauregard (1818–1893), Confederate general, inventor, civic leader
- Pantaléon Costa de Beauregard (1806–1864), French statesman, archaeologist, historian and ornithologist
- Pierre Raphaël Paillot de Beauregard (1734–1799), French general of the French Revolutionary Wars
- Robin Beauregard (born 1979), American amateur athlete, water polo
- Stéphane Beauregard (born 1968), Canadian professional athlete, hockey
- Miss Violetta Beauregarde, Italian singer and model
- Harriet Howard (1823–1865), English actress and Comtesse de Beauregard
- Blanche Lamontagne-Beauregard (1889–1958), Canadian poet
- Paradime (born 1975), American musician born Freddie Beauregard
- Jefferson Beauregard Sessions III (born 1946), Attorney General of the United States

== Characters ==
- Beauregard, offspring of fictional Elsie the Cow
- Beauregard (Muppet), theater janitor
- Beauregard the Demon, in the Xanth fantasy novel series
- Bo Brady or Beauregard Aurelius Brady, a character on the American soap opera Days of our Lives
- Beauregard "Beau" Bennet, outlaw in film Face to Face
- Beauregard, "Bo", vampire in Robin Mckinley's novel Sunshine
- Beauregard Bottomley, main character in the movie Champagne for Caesar
- Beauregard Bugleboy, a recurring character in comic strip Pogo
- Beauregard Duke, character from Dukes of Hazzard in short as Bo Duke
- Beauregard 'Beau' Felton, a detective character in the TV series Homicide: Life on the Street
- Beauregard Jackson, pilot in Land of the Lost
- Beauregard Jackson Pickett Burnside, Southern aristocrat in musical comedy Mame, and in works it was based on
- Beauregard LaFeyettane, in American Dad! episode "Irregarding Steve"
- Beauregard Langdon, a character in American Horror Story: Murder House
- Beauregard Lionett, a human monk in the D&D Web Series Critical Role
- Colonel Beauregard, from an episode of The Scooby-Doo Show
- Jack Beauregard, gunfighter in film My Name Is Nobody
- Kennebrew Beauregard, a character in the movie BlacKkKlansman
- Mr. Beauregard, a one-off character in Rick and Morty, season 2, episode 4
- Remy Beauregard Hadley, commonly known as "Thirteen", in the House MD television series
- Silena Beauregard, a character in Rick Riordan's "Percy Jackson and the Olympians" series
- Characters in the book Charlie and the Chocolate Factory:
  - Violet Beauregarde
  - Mrs. Beauregarde
  - Mr. Beauregarde

== Places ==
=== France ===
- Château de Beauregard (disambiguation), any of several by that name
- Beauregard, Ain
- Beauregard, Lot
- Saint-Jean-de-Beauregard
- Beauregard-et-Bassac
- Clermont-de-Beauregard
- Beauregard-Baret
- Beauregard-de-Terrasson
- Beauregard-Vendon
- Beauregard, Martinique, see List of populated places in Martinique

=== United States ===
==== Louisiana ====
- Beauregard Parish, Louisiana
- Beauregard Town, district of Baton Rouge
- Fort Beauregard, Army base
- Louisiana National Guard Training Center Pineville, previously Camp Beauregard, Louisiana National Guard base

==== Other ====
- Beauregard, Alabama
- Beauregard, Mississippi

=== Quebec, Canada ===
- Lac Beauregard Water Aerodrome
- Sainte-Lucie-de-Beauregard Aerodrome

== Other ==
- American "Beauregard", a variety of sweet potato
- Château Beauregard, a Pomerol winery
- Les Beauregards, a Premier cru vineyard in Chablis
- "Beauregard" (song), by RAQ
- Beauregard v Canada, court case
- Beauregard claim, a type of claim in United States patent prosecution
- General Beauregard Lee, American Groundhog's Day icon
- USS Beauregard (1861), former Confederate warship
