= Ballets roses =

1959 French sex abuse scandal

The ballets roses ("pink ballets"), also known as the ballets roses affair (French: Affaire des Ballets roses), was a sex abuse scandal that was publicised in 1959 in France. In a fashionable country house near Paris, the Pavillon du Butard in La Celle-Saint-Cloud, belonging to the National Assembly, a group of girls aged 15 to 17 performed "ballets" attended by prominent figures of the political and social worlds, notably, André Le Troquer, at the time president of the National Assembly. The performances were alleged to have ended in orgies.

The scandal came to light when four mothers of the girls became suspicious. 23 people were charged in relation to the ballets roses, including Le Troquer, who was charged with "offences against morality", as well as actress Elisabeth Pinajeff. 22, including Le Troquer and Pinajeff, were found guilty and sentenced in court.

== Bibliography ==
- Manheim, Ralph Nord by Louis-Ferdinand Céline ISBN 1-56478-142-9, p. 441
