= Pavillon du Butard =

Hunting lodge in La Celle-Saint-Cloud, France

Coordinates: 48°50′24″N 2°08′35″E

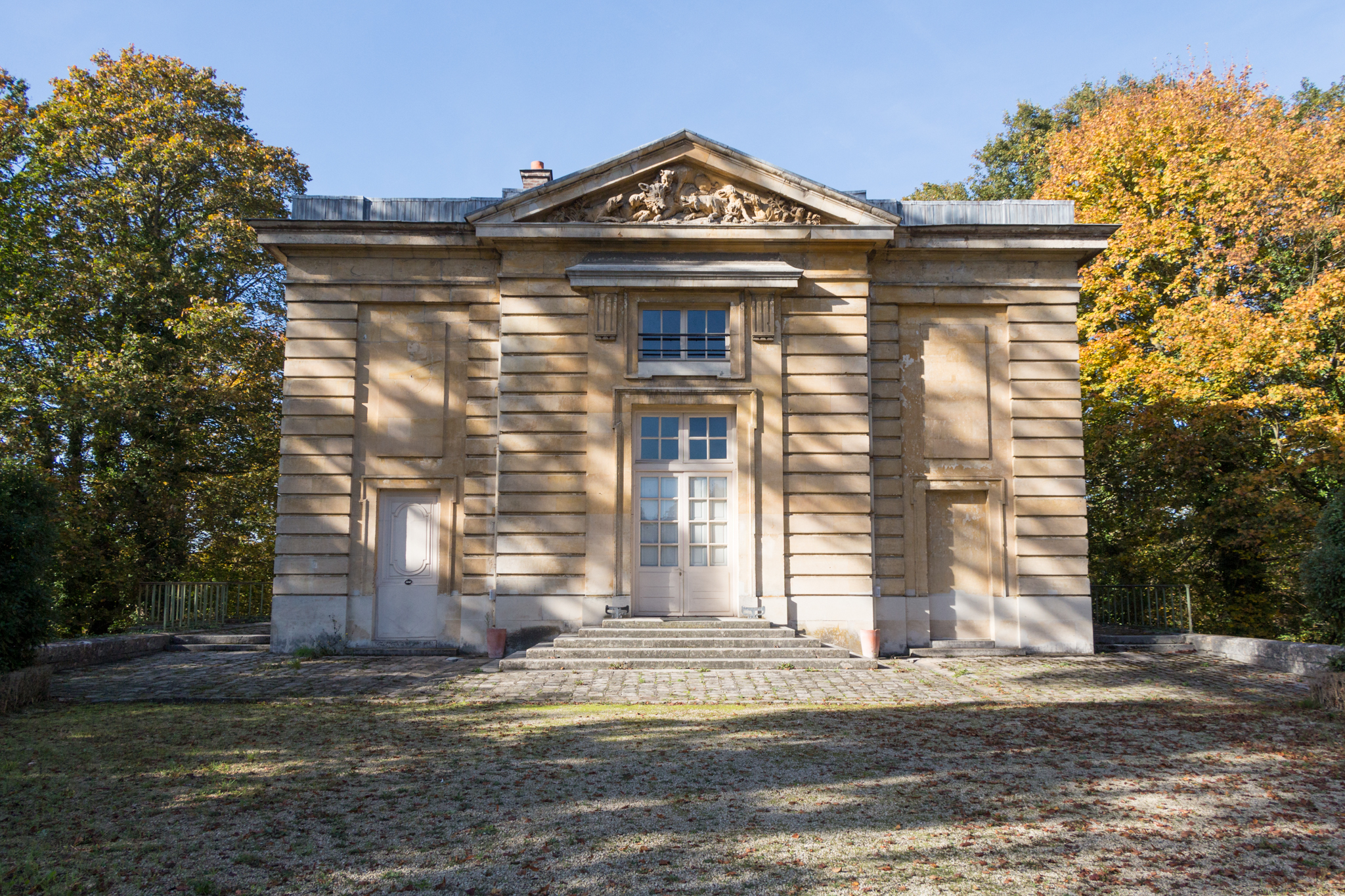
Main façade

The Pavilion du Butard (French pronunciation: [pavijɔ̃ dy bytaʁ]) is a hunting lodge in the Forêt de Fausses-Reposes in the territory of La Celle-Saint-Cloud in Yvelines, France.

== History ==
Historically part of the gardens of Versailles, it was designed by Ange-Jacques Gabriel for Louis XV and built between 1750 and 1754. It was made state property on 27 June 1794 by François-Nicolas Périgon, notary at Paris, during the French Revolution. On 23 April 1802 it became the property of empress Joséphine de Beauharnais, who wished to merge it with her Malmaison estate, but it returned to being state property on her divorce from Napoleon in 1809. It was later also enjoyed by Charles X and emperor Napoleon III.

It was occupied by the Prussians during the Franco-Prussian War. Still state property, it was made a monument historique on 29 August 1927. Later in the 20th century, it because associated with the Ballets roses affair. As of 2019, the pavilion was the subject of interest from the Centre des monuments nationaux, with a view to a hypothetical purchase.

== Sources ==
- Detailed history of the Pavillon du Butard by Ed Christen – on Gallica
- Philippe Loiseleur des Longchamps Deville, La Celle Saint-Cloud, cellule d'histoire, Pontoise, Graphédis, 1979
