= Philippe Loiseleur des Longchamps Deville =

French historian

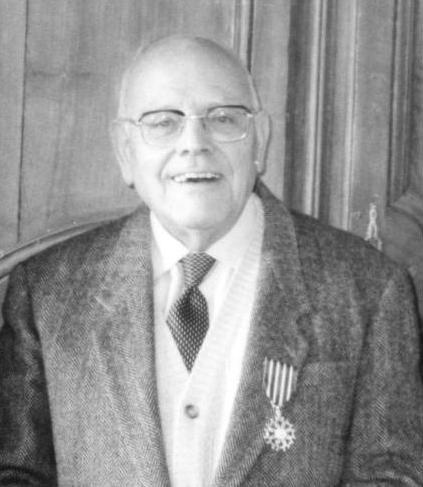

Philippe Loiseleur des Longchamps Deville (27 July 1923 – 24 February 2003) was a French historian.

== Life ==
Born in Dakar, he was the eldest son of Henry Loiseleur des Longchamps Deville (1887, Paris – 1956, Sarlat), chief administrator of France d'outre-mer, and Marie Gramain (1889–1966). He studied at the Collège Saint-Joseph and in Sarlat, before attending the Faculté de Toulouse. In parallel to his career as an 'attaché de direction' at the Banque Française du Commerce Extérieur from 1948 to 1953 then at the société H. Ernaut-Somua, he wrote his first monographs on the towns of La Celle Saint-Cloud then on those of Payrac. Keen on the history of the Languedoc, south-west France and the Ile-de-France and influenced by several historical figures, he produced a large number of monographs and biographies and also frequently organised conferences. Some were presented to members of the Vieilles maisons françaises (V.M.F.), Philippe Loiseleur des Longchamps having joined that association's Lotoise section.

For several years he attended international French-speaking colloquia in the canton of Payrac organised by the Association des écrivains de langue française and its president Edmond Jouve. There he organised an annual conference on subjects linked to literary questions, the history of manufacture, art history and the history of gastronomy. He also followed his wife Simonne Loiseleur des Longchamps Deville (1928–2018), president of the Cercle d'Étude du Gourdonnais from 1989 to 2018 and 'chevalier des Arts et des Lettres' (2011) in the inventory of church furniture of Le Haut-Quercy and as organiser of public exhibitions marking the 'Journées européennes du Patrimoine'. They were both members of the Association de Sauvegarde des Maisons et Paysages du Quercy and in that role were consulted on expanding the "La Bouriane" guide.

Philippe Loiseleur des Longchamps Deville received the knight's cross of the ordre des Arts et des Lettres from Pierre Messmer in September 1997 at the 7th Colloque francophone international du Canton de Payrac (Lot). He died in Toulouse.

== Family ==
The Loiseleur des Longchamps family was an old middle-class family from Thymerais, originally from Brézolles where the author Martin Loiseleur died in 1624. It added the toponym des Longchamps in the 17th century. Early in the 19th century Jean-Joseph Loiseleur-Deslongchamps (Philippe and Louis-Albert's great-grandfather) added Deville to the family name in homage to his mother Basilide-Barthélémie Deville, daughter of a consul in Arles.

Jacques-François Loiseleur-Deslongchamps (1747–1843) was engineer-geographer to the French king and took part in expanding the Cassini maps in the Rouergue and south-west France, whilst Jean-Louis-Auguste Loiseleur-Deslongchamps (1774–1849) was a botanist and member of the Académie de médecine. Jean-Louis-Auguste's second son Auguste Loiseleur-Deslongchamps (1805–1840) was an orientalist and worked in the manuscripts department of the Bibliothèque du Roi. Louis-Albert Loiseleur des Longchamps Deville (1919–2005) was a diplomat.

== Selected publications ==
=== Biographies and studies on the Loiseleur des Longchamps Deville family ===
- La famille Douzon de Bourran d'après ses archives, Paris, privately published, 1962.
- Portraits de famille, Paris, Les Presses réunies, March 1964.
- De Cèdre et de rose : vie et œuvre du botaniste Loiseleur-Deslongchamps (1774–1849), La Celle Saint-Cloud, self-published, December 1973, 109 p.
- Henry Loiseleur des Longchamps mon père (1887–1956), Payrac, privately published, June 1987, 55 p.
- Inventaire des œuvres des membres de la famille Loiseleur des Longchamps, Payrac, privately published, 1988.
- Origine de notre famille : Brezolles, Dreux, Payrac, privately published, 1991.
- Le Docteur et Madame Deville : témoins et acteurs du XIXe siecle, Payrac, privately published, 2002.
- "Qui était la femme du géographe Loiseleur des Longchamps ?" Revue du Rouergue, 1960, n°53, pp. 69–75.
- "Deux frères et la Révolution", Revue du Rouergue, 1961, n°58, pp. 190–204.
- "A propos de Jacques-François Loiseleur des Longchamps", Revue du Rouergue, 1977.
- "Le botaniste Loiseleur-Deslongchamps et le cèdre du Liban", Actes du Colloque internationale francophone de Payrac, 1996.

=== Monographs and local history ===
- Histoire de H. Ernault-Somua : ses origines, sa double histoire, Paris, Les Presses Réunies, July 1963, 18 x 24 cm, broché, 38 p. + photos, plans etc. (edition of 5000).
- La Celle Saint-Cloud, cellule d'histoire, Pontoise, Graphédis, April 1979, 254 p. (out of print).
- Chroniques de Payrac : du Moyen Âge au XIXe siecle, Cahors, Publi Fusion, 1997, 120 p. + 28 p. of photographs and old postcards.

=== Articles on history ===
- "Le Centenaire H. Ernault-Somua, Les activités industrielles du XIVe arrondissement", Bulletin officiel du Comité municipal des fêtes du XIVe arrondissement de Paris, Paris, October 1963, n°32, pp. 11 and 12, with a sketch of the author
- "Un voyage aux Grandes Indes en 1818", Revue Maritime, April 1964, n°209.
- "La naissance d'Alfred Chauchard", Revue du Rouergue, April–June 1965.
- « Science et foi » (sur Jean-François-Albert du Pouget, marquis de Nadaillac), L’écho du Gourdonnais, May 1982, numero 159.
- "Pèlerinage à Rocamadour au XIX siecle", L’écho du Gourdonnais, November 1982, n°164.
- "A Beauregard et La Jonchère, Bertrand et Fanny", Revue de l'Histoire de Versailles, 1983.
- "A la découverte des petits sanctuaires du Gourdonnais", Vieilles Maisons Françaises, Paris, July 1884, numero 103, pp. 50–53.
- "Brin d’histoire : le pape Pie VII à Payrac", L’écho du Gourdonnais, November 1984, n°186; December 1984, numero 187; February 1985, n°189.
- "François Espaillat de Masclat à Saint-Domingue", L’écho du Gourdonnais, November 1985, numero 197.
- "A Laval, jour des morts, jour des vivants", L’écho du Gourdonnais, December 1985, numero 198.
- "Thomas Gobert et le système d'adduction d'eau de Versailles sur le territoire de la Celle Saint-Cloud", Revue de l'Histoire de Versailles, 1986.
- "Sonnent les cloches de Masclat", L’écho du Gourdonnais April 1986, numero 202.
- "Visite de nos ports de guerre par des bourgeois parisiens au XIX^{e} siècle", Neptunia, 1987, numero 165, pp. 26–31.
- "La paroisse de Payrac pendant la Révolution", L’écho du Gourdonnais, July–August 1989, numero 238.
- "Survol de l’histoire de Payrac", L’Ogache, numero 1, 1989.
- "Installation d'un archiprêtre à Payrac au XVIII siecle", L’écho du Gourdonnais January 1990, n°243.
- "Les plaisirs de la table chez Pierre Benoit", Actes du Colloque international francophone de Payrac, A.D.E.L.F., September 1991.
- "Les Nouvelles de Kadaré ", Actes du Colloque international francophone de Payrac, A.D.E.L.F., September 1992.
- "A Sylvain Toulze, paladin mystique de l'Occitanie", Actes du Colloque international francophone de Payrac, A.D.E.L.F., September 1993.
- "Maurice Constantin-Weyer, trappeur, romancier et historien", Actes du Colloque international francophone de Payrac, A.D.E.L.F., sept. 1994.
- "Analyse d'une instruction pastorale de Mgr de Montesquiou en faveur des Jésuites (1764), sauvée de la lacération et des flammes", Bulletin de la Société d'Art et d'Histoire de Sarlat et du Périgord Noir, 1995, numero 61, pp. 67–72.
- "Fénelon et le Quercy", Actes du Colloque international francophone de Payrac, A.D.E.L.F., September 1995.
- [en collaboration avec Simonne Loiseleur des Longchamps, née Durand (1928–2018)] "Restauration d'une maison paysanne dans le Haut-Quercy", Maisons paysannes de France, Paris, 3e trimestre 1995, n°117.
- "Bourgeois de Bordeaux contre vin de Cahors", Bulletin de la Société des études du Lot, volume CXVII, 1996, pp. 11–24.
- "Le service de la Poste à Payrac à travers les âges", L'Ogache, Bulletin municipal de Payrac, 1997, numero 10, p. 2.
- "La Vie au Roucal pendant la dernière guerre", Bulletin de la Société d'Art et d'Histoire de Sarlat et du Périgord Noir, I, 1998, numero 75, pp. 159–166; II, 1999, numero 76, pp. 43–48.
- "Caux : l'ingénieur Jean Durand, fils de Caux" Groupe de Recherches et d’Études du Clermontais, 1999, numero 86–87–88, pp. 11–16.
- "Les Cavaignac et le Payracois", L'Ogache, Bulletin municipal de Payrac, 2000, numero 13, p. 10.

== Sources and citations ==
- (in French) [edited by] Isabelle Havelange, Histoire de l'éducation, published by the Institut national de Recherche pédagogique, September 1998, n°79–80, pp. 176, on the subject of "l'Analyse d'une instruction pastorale...".
- (in French) Michel Laverret, « Voyage dans l’Empire de Flore en Basse-Marche et en Poitou au XVIIe», Cahiers du GRHAIJ, n°1 – 1998, 420 pp. (supplement to Bulletin n°7, Groupe de recherches historiques et archéologiques de l’Isle-Jourdain), p. 5, on botanist Jean-Louis Auguste Loiseleur des Longchamps.
- (in French) François Nadaud, Payrac de 1900 aux années d’après guerre, La belle endormie, Cahors, December 2014, 444pp, ISBN 978-2-7466-7585-8, p. 3 (preface by Bernard Choulet), p. 305 (on the château de Payrac).
