= Queering Chinese Kinship =

2022 non-fiction book by Lin Song

Queering Chinese Kinship: Queer Public Culture in Globalizing China
- Author: Lin Song
- Publisher: Hong Kong University Press
- Publication date: 1 March 2022
- ISBN: 978-9-888-52873-8

Queering Chinese Kinship: Queer Public Culture in Globalizing China is a non-fiction book about queer culture in Chinese culture and family structures. Written by Lin Song, it was published in 2022 by Hong Kong University Press as part of their Queer Asia series.
