= French people in Hong Kong =

Total population
- 25,000 (2016, French Consulate); 6,534 (2019, Immigration Department)

The French Consulate estimates there are over 25,000 French citizens in Hong Kong. The Immigration Department of Hong Kong estimated that 6,534 French nationals were in Hong Kong in 2019, an increase from 2,375 in 2009; the IMMD counts people physically present in Hong Kong because some people with Hong Kong permanent residency may have left the city.

It is the largest French community in Asia.

== Education ==
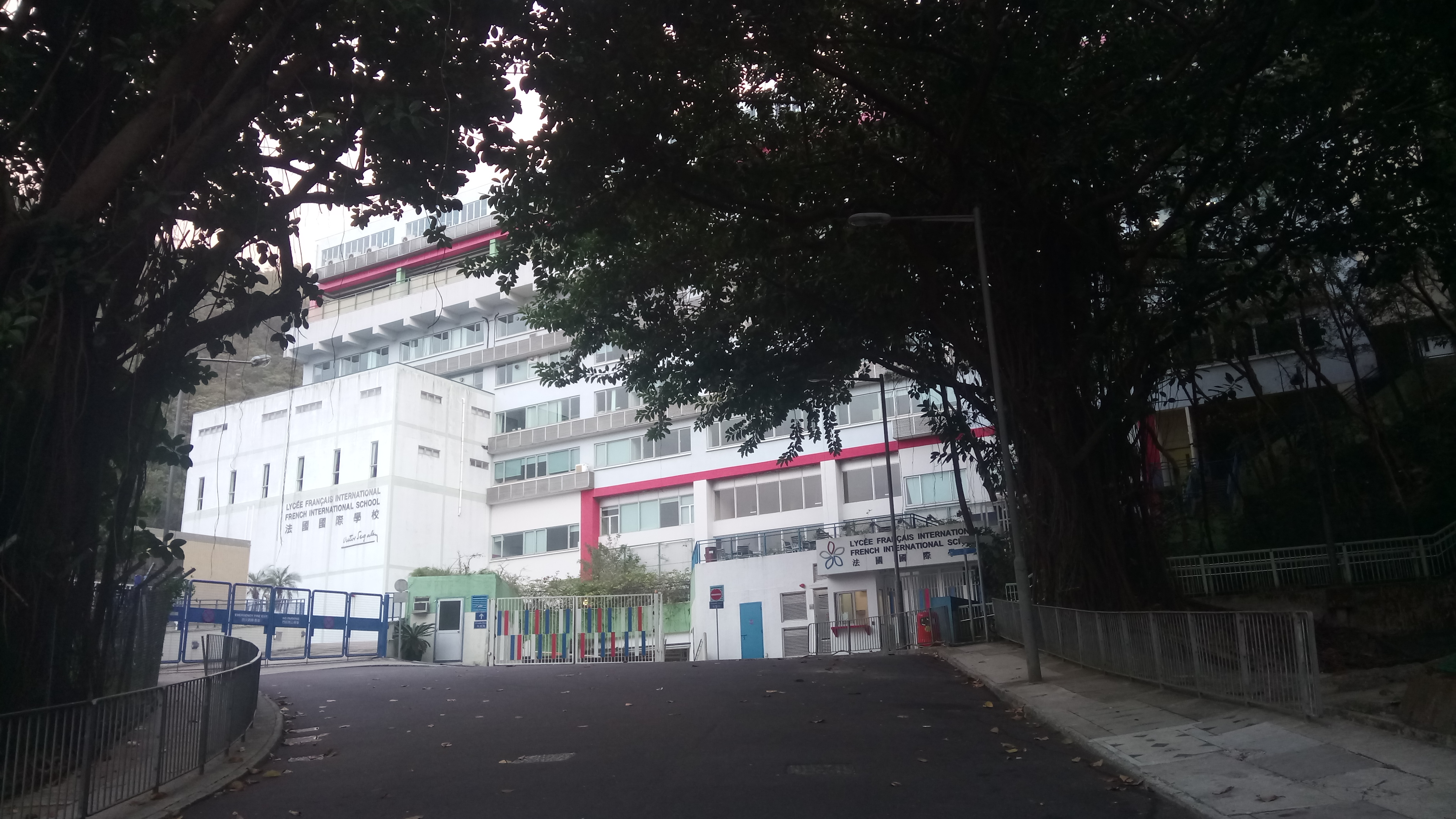
French International School of Hong Kong Blue Pool Road Campus, Happy Valley

The French International School of Hong Kong operates multiple campuses in Hong Kong.

== Famous ethnic French people ==
- Camille Cheng: Swimmer
- Alexandre Dujardin: Footballer
- Remi Dujardin: Footballer
- Henri Vetch: Publisher, and first head of Hong Kong University Press

== See also ==
- France–Hong Kong relations
- Le French May
- Former French Mission Building
- Béthanie (Hong Kong)
