= Hôtel de Ville, La Celle-Saint-Cloud =

Town hall in La Celle-Saint-Cloud, France

Hôtel de Ville
- The main frontage of the Hôtel de Ville in April 2013

General information
- Type: City hall
- Architectural style: Modern style
- Location: La Celle-Saint-Cloud, France
- Coordinates: 48.8484°N 2.1362°E
- Completed: 1971

The Hôtel de Ville (French pronunciation: [otɛl də vil], City Hall) is a municipal building in La Celle-Saint-Cloud, Yvelines, in the western suburbs of Paris, standing on Avenue Charles de Gaulle.

== History ==
The old town hall

Following the French Revolution, the new town council initially met in the home of the mayor at the time. This arrangement continued until July 1829, when Charles-Gilbert, Viscount Morel de Vindé, whose seat was at Château de la Celle, paid for a building to serve as a combined town hall and school. The building was located on the northwestern side of what is now Avenue Yves Levallois.

The new building was designed in the neoclassical style, built in brick with a cement render finish and probably completed around 1832. The design involved a symmetrical main frontage of nine bays facing onto the street. The central bay featured a doorway with a stone surround and a keystone on the ground floor, and a segmental-headed window with a stone surround and a keystone on the first floor. There was a doorway for the girls' school in the third bay from the left, and a doorway for the boys' school in the third bay from the right. The remainder of the building was fenestrated by square-headed windows with stone surrounds on the ground floor, and by segmental-headed windows with stone surrounds and keystones on the first floor. In the central bay, there was a panel inscribed "Ancienne Mairie" below the first-floor window and, in the other bays, there were plain panels in same position. The central bay was flanked by full-height Doric order pilasters supporting a cornice.

After the École Louis-Pasteur opened on Avenue Auguste Dutreux in October 1937, the building was used exclusively for municipal purposes and, after the council relocated as well, it was converted to serve as an arts centre initially known as "Assartx" and then, from 2012, as "Le Carré des Arts".

In the late 1960s, following significant population growth, the council led by the mayor, Lucien-René Duchesne, decided to commission a modern municipal building. The site they selected had formed part of the large park which surrounded the Château de la Celle. The new building was designed in the modern style, built in concrete and glass and was completed in January 1971.

The building was laid out in a square formation with an inner courtyard, also in the form of a square. The design of the three-storey building involved an asymmetrical main frontage of 20 bays facing south onto the Parvis de la Mairie. The left-hand section of eight bays was projected forward and clad in alternating rows of glass and grey panelling, while the right-hand section of 12 bays contained a glass entrance on the ground floor and but was otherwise also clad in the same style. Internally, the principal room was the Salle du Conseil (council chamber).

A new two-storey media library was built at a cost of €8.6 million and opened in front of the left-hand section of the main frontage in December 2025.
