= Wartime Macau =

2016 book by Geoffrey C. Gunn

- First edition
- Editor: Geoffrey C. Gunn
- Language: English
- Genre: Non-fiction
- Publisher: Hong Kong University Press
- Publication date: 2016

Wartime Macau: Under the Japanese Shadow is a 2016 non-fiction book edited by Geoffrey C. Gunn, published by Hong Kong University Press. It explores Macau, a neutral Portuguese colony during World War II that was surrounded by Japanese-held territory.

== Contents ==
Although the text is presented as an edited volume, Gunn wrote three of the six chapters plus the introduction, epilogue, and conclusion. Gunn's chapters included Chapter 1: "Wartime Macau in the Wider Diplomatic Sphere," Chapter 3: "Hunger amidst Plenty: Rice Supply and Livelihood in Wartime Macau," and Chapter 6: "The British Army Aid Group (BAAG) and the Anti-Japanese Resistance Movement in Macau."

Three chapters were contributed by others – Chapter 2: "Macau 1937–45: Living on the Edge: Economic Management over Military Defences" by João F.O. Botas; Chapter 4: "The Macanese at War: Survival and Identity among Portuguese Eurasians during World War II" by Roy E. Xavier; and Chapter 5: "Nossa Gente (Our People): The Portuguese Refugee Community in Wartime Macau" by Stuart Braga. Wartime Macau studies the struggles Macau faced to obtain food, medicine, and other supplies during World War II. It explores in the influence of Japan, Chinese nationalists, British intelligence, and other external powers on Macau. Overall, the book studies the financial, economic, and geo-political impacts on Macau, in addition to telling the stories of individuals living there.

== Critical Reception ==
Peter Gordon wrote in a review published in Asian Review of Books that Wartime Macau has "more coherence of style and focus" compared to other books made up of essays written by multiple people. Another review stated that "the major contribution of the book is the substantial advance it makes in our understanding of the very difficult economic and financial predicament of Macao and its government." Other reviews noted that this text filled in an existing knowledge gap - the lack of English-language publications on the topic of Macau during World War II.
