= André Le Troquer =

French politician (1884–1963)

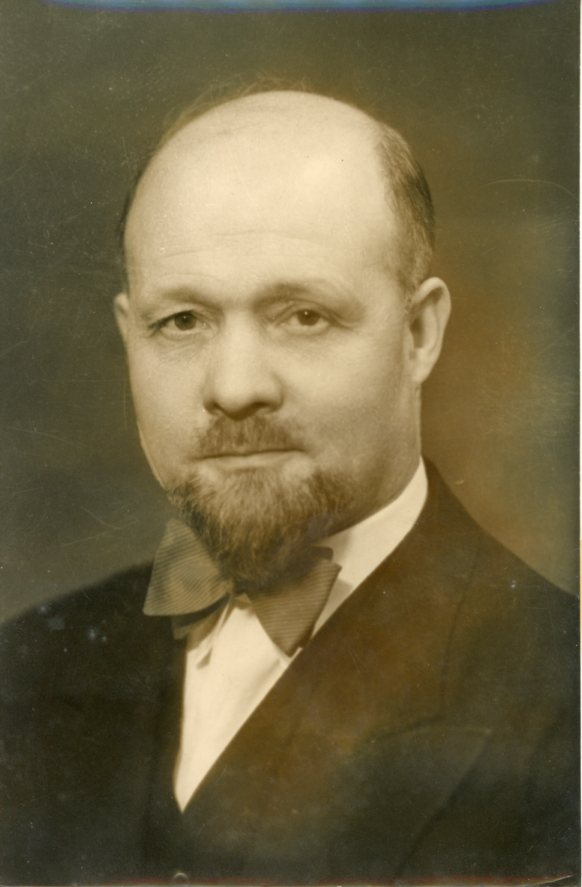
Le Troquer in 1936

André Le Troquer (27 October 1884 – 11 November 1963) was a French politician and socialist lawyer. He served as president of the National Assembly from 12 January 1954 to 10 January 1955, and a second time from 24 January 1956 to 4 October 1958.

== Biography ==
Elected deputy of Paris in 1936, he sat on the National Assembly from 1945 to 1958. André Le Troquer spoke out against the demands of the armistice of June 1940. In 1942, with Félix Gouin, he defended Léon Blum during the Process of Riom. He sat on the Consultative Assembly of Algiers before being named commissioner of War. He was at the side of Charles de Gaulle at the liberation of Paris.

In 1945, Le Troquer became minister of the interior from 23 January 1946 to 2 June 1945 in the Félix Gouin government and minister of national defense in Léon Blum's government from 13 December 1946 to 13 January 1947. Vice President of the National Assembly, he was the interim president of the Congress of Versailles at the time of the election of René Coty to the presidency of the Republic in December 1953.

In his capacity as president of the National Assembly, he played an important role throughout the events of May–June 1958 that marked the return of General de Gaulle to power. He went with Senate president Gaston Monnerville to Saint-Cloud for a decisive conference with de Gaulle and was there assured that de Gaulle's return would be carried out in conformance to constitutional practices. He read René Coty's message announcing that he had "appealed to the most renowned of the French" and presided over the sittings from the first to the third of June 1958 (inauguration of de Gaulle and powers to refine the new constitution). Defeated in the legislative elections of November 1958, he left politics in 1960 but not without having called for a "no" vote on the referendum of 8 January 1961 about Algeria.

Le Troquer was charged with "offenses against morality" in the 1959 ballets roses scandal for which he was sentenced to probation and charged a modest fine.

He was president of the Municipal Council of Paris. He was decorated with the Croix de guerre for his participation in World War I where he was injured, resulting in the amputation of his right arm.

| Preceded by Édouard Herriot | President of the National Assembly; 1954–1958 | Succeeded by Jacques Chaban-Delmas |
