= France–Hong Kong relations =

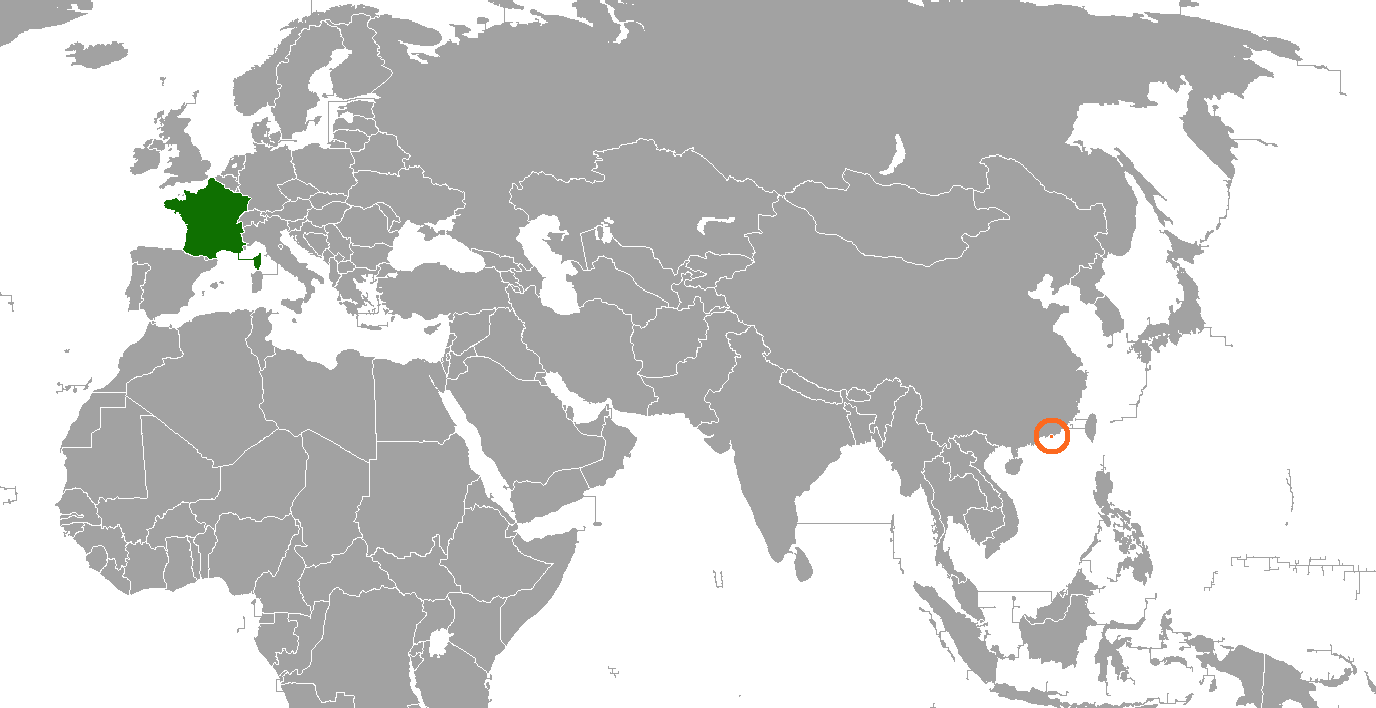
- France: Hong Kong

France–Hong Kong relations refers to international relations between France and Hong Kong.

== History ==
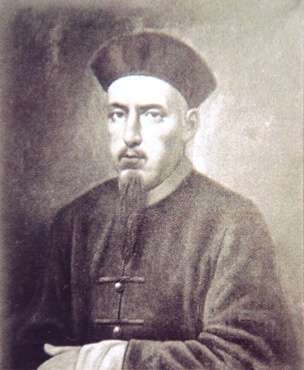
The execution of the Paris Foreign Missions Society missionary Auguste Chapdelaine was the official cause of the French involvement in the Second Opium War.

France and Hong Kong bilateral relations could be traced back to the period of the Second French Empire (1852 to 1870). Hong Kong had been a British colony since the First Opium War. In 1856, a French missionary, Father Auguste Chapdelaine, was executed by Chinese local authorities in Guangxi province, which at that time was not open to foreigners. As a response, the French Empire joined with the British navy and prompted the Second Opium War. As a result of the victory of the joint navy, the Qing Empire ceded Kowloon Peninsular to the British Empire as an extension of the colony of Hong Kong.

The French Consulate General Hong Kong in Admiralty, Hong Kong has been the representation of France in Hong Kong. The consul to Hong Kong was first appointed by decree from Emperor Napoleon III in 1862. The connection between the two continued when the United Kingdom retreated from Hong Kong in 1997. Since then, Hong Kong had full autonomy in relations with foreign countries in a broad range of appropriate fields. The Hong Kong Economic and Trade Office in Brussels is responsible for the European Union and covering also the relations with France and other nations.

== Trade ==
France is Hong Kong's seventh largest export destination in Europe, while Hong Kong is France's sixth largest export destination in Asia. As at 2015, the value of exports from Hong Kong to France was worth US$1.01 billion, while the exporting goods from France to Hong Kong was worth US$5 billion. Major exports from Hong Kong to France are integrated circuits (14.2%), semiconductor devices (7.94%), broadcasting equipment (7.91%), and jewellery (12%). Major exports from France to Hong Kong are trunks and cases (18.2%), planes, helicopters, and/or spacecraft (16.2%), wine (7.82%), and beauty products (5.12%).

Over 600 French companies are operating in Hong Kong, among which 73 French companies established regional headquarters in Hong Kong, while another 109 had regional offices.

== Social and Cultural ==
French investment is substantial in Hong Kong, with the total stock of direct investment amounted to US$8.4 billion. Reflecting France's diverse activities, 2600 French nationals resided in Hong Kong as at 2016. The Alliance Française de Hong Kong located in Wan Chai, Shatin, and Jordan, Hong Kong are found to promote French culture and language in Hong Kong.

Both France and Hong Kong have offered "Working Holiday Programs". The program allows 750 youngsters to holiday in France or Hong Kong and to take temporary employment as needed to cover the expenses of their visit.

== Incidents ==
=== 1884 Anti-France Strike and Riot ===
Hong Kong dock workers in Whampoa Dock, Hung Hom started an anti-France strike on 11 September 1884 in order to protest French involvement in Indochina, South China Sea, and Taiwan. The workers involved were arrested by the Royal Hong Kong Police and fined by the court. That was followed by a riot starting on 3 October. Negotiation between the government and the protesters eventually resulted in the return of the fine to the workers. The long term strike and riot affected French fleet's reparation and supply. French faced several military setbacks in Indochina and Taiwan in late 1884 and early 1885, but ended up with a diplomatic success with the recognition of French protectorate over Annam and Tonkin in the Treaty of Tientsin concluded on 9 June 1885.

=== 2014 Umbrella Movement ===
In Fall 2014, Hong Kong had seen a large scale protest, the Umbrella Movement, in striving for full democracy in Hong Kong. The French Foreign Ministry expressed that the ministry was "closely following" street demonstrations in Hong Kong and emphasized Hong Kongese's right to march peacefully. French Foreign Ministry spokesman Romain Nadal expressed in the news conference, "We are closely following the evolution of the situation and we reiterate our attachment to the right to demonstrate peacefully".

== See also ==
- French people in Hong Kong
