= French International School of Hong Kong =

Private school

Coordinates: 22.26771°N 114.23674°E

The French International School of Hong Kong
- Lycée Français International de Hong Kong
- Chai Wan (Primary); Jardine's Lookout (Kindergarten and Secondary); Happy Valley (Secondary); Tseung Kwan O (Primary and Secondary); Hong Kong

Information
- Type: International School, Private, comprehensive, Secondary, Primary, Kindergarten international, secondary, co-educational
- Established: 1963
- Faculty: 300
- Enrollment: 2,800
- Language: English, French
- Campuses: Chai Wan, Jardine's Lookout, Blue Pool Road, Tseung Kwan O
- Accreditation: International Curriculum Association, International Baccalareaut, Cambridge Examinations, IBDP, AEFE, IGCSE
- Website: www.fis.edu.hk

French International School of Hong Kong

Chinese name
- Traditional Chinese: 香港法國國際學校
- Simplified Chinese: 香港法国国际学校
Transcriptions
Standard Mandarin
- Hanyu Pinyin: Xiānggǎng Fǎguó Guójì Xuéxiào
Yue: Cantonese
- Jyutping: hoeng1 gong2 faat3 gwok3 gwok3 zai3 hok6 haau6

French name
- French: Lycée français international Victor-Segalen

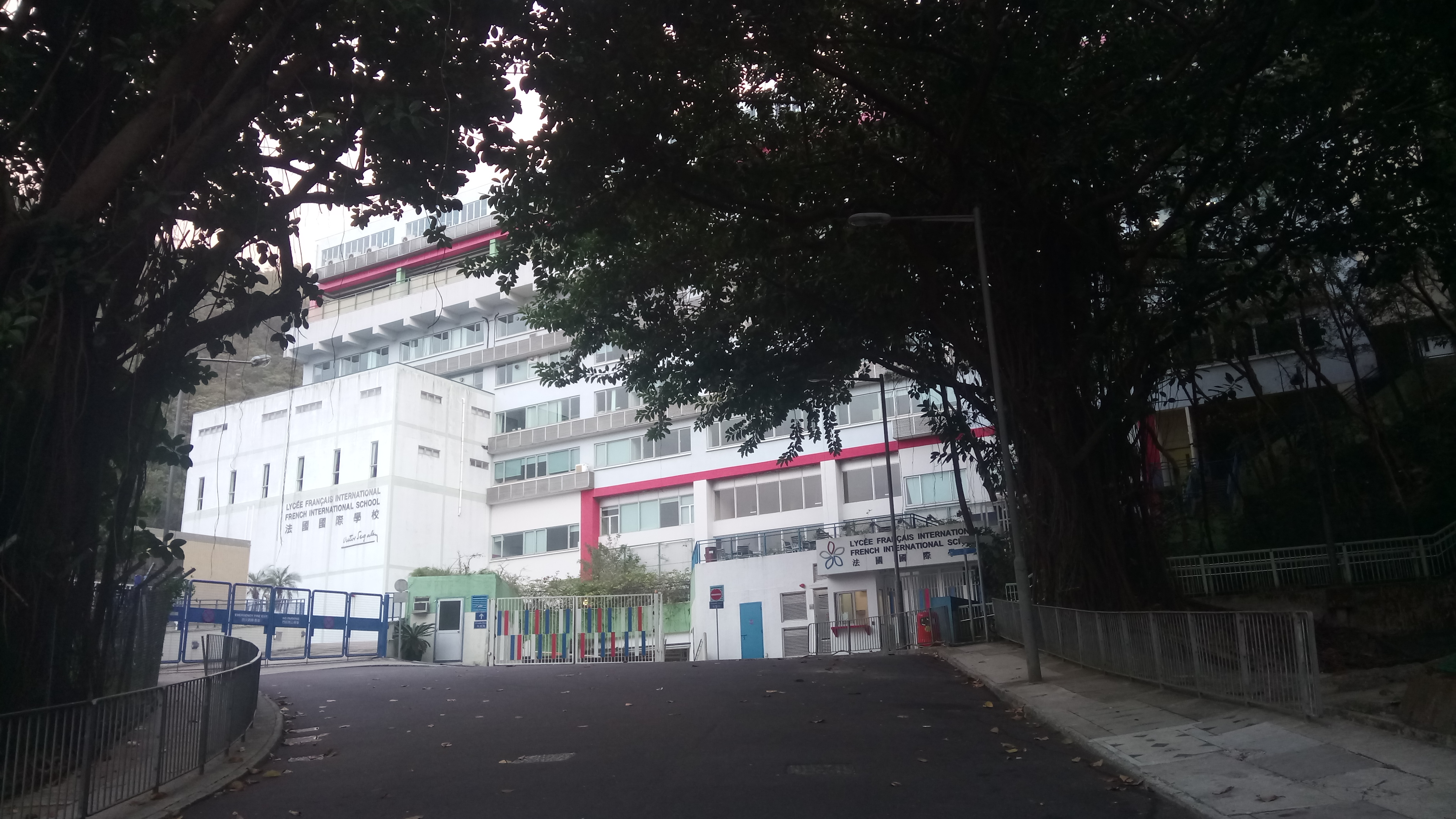
Blue Pool Road Campus, Happy Valley

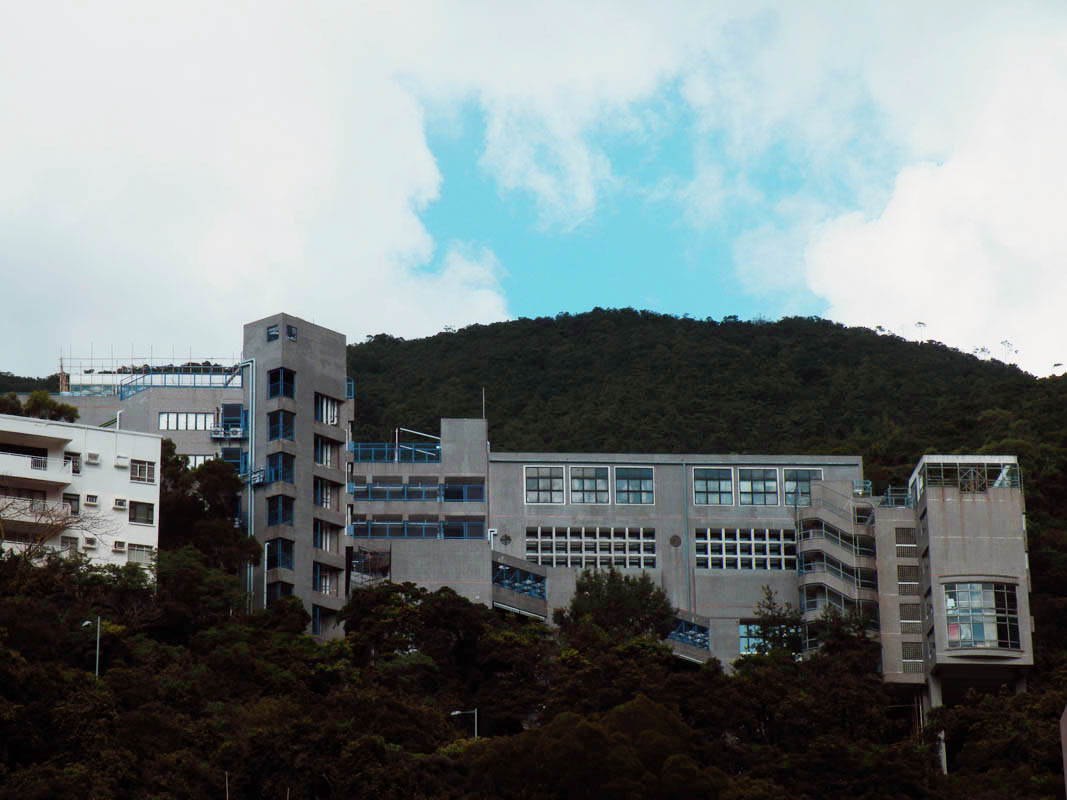
Jardine's Lookout Campus

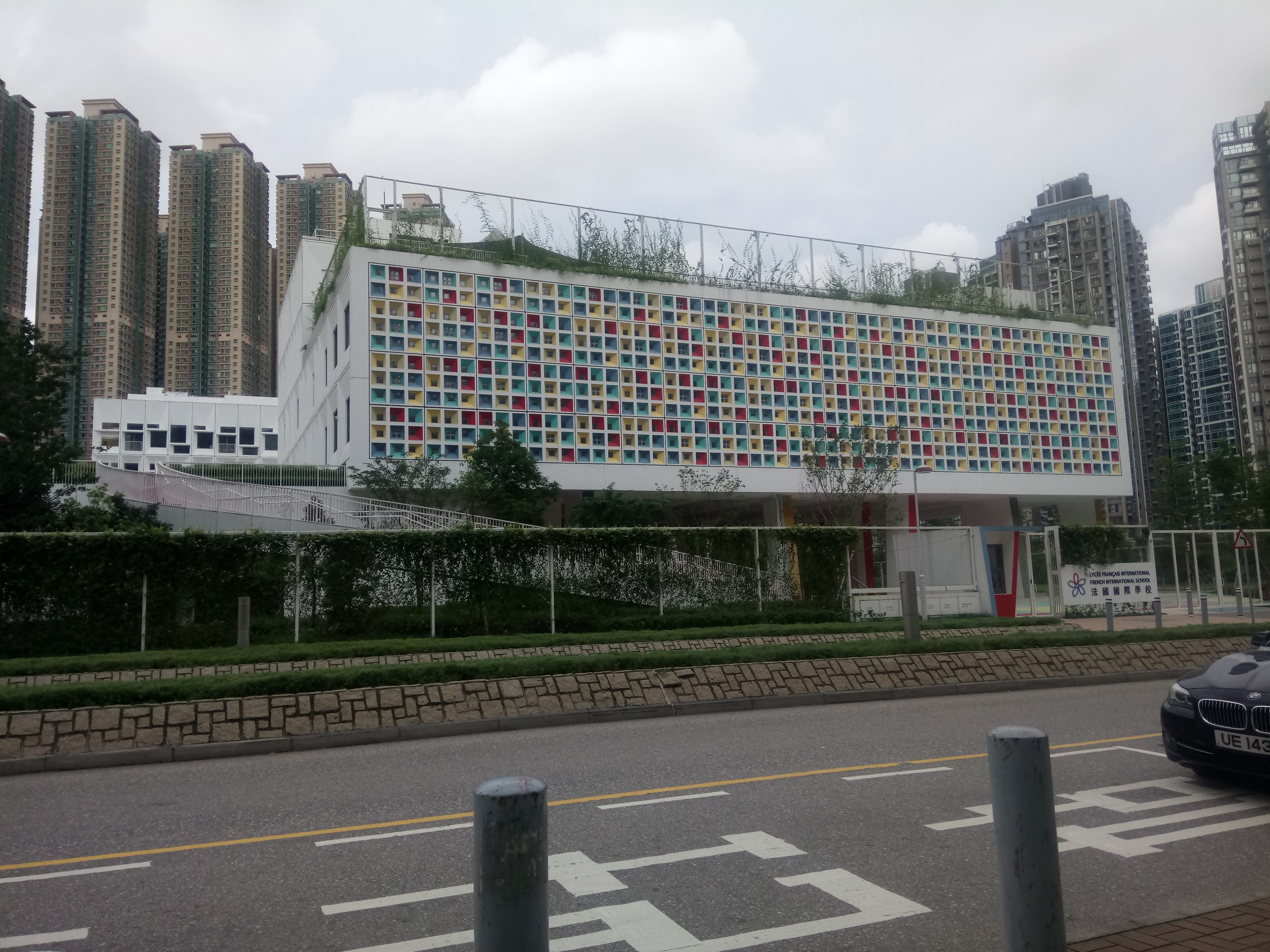
Tseung Kwan O Campus

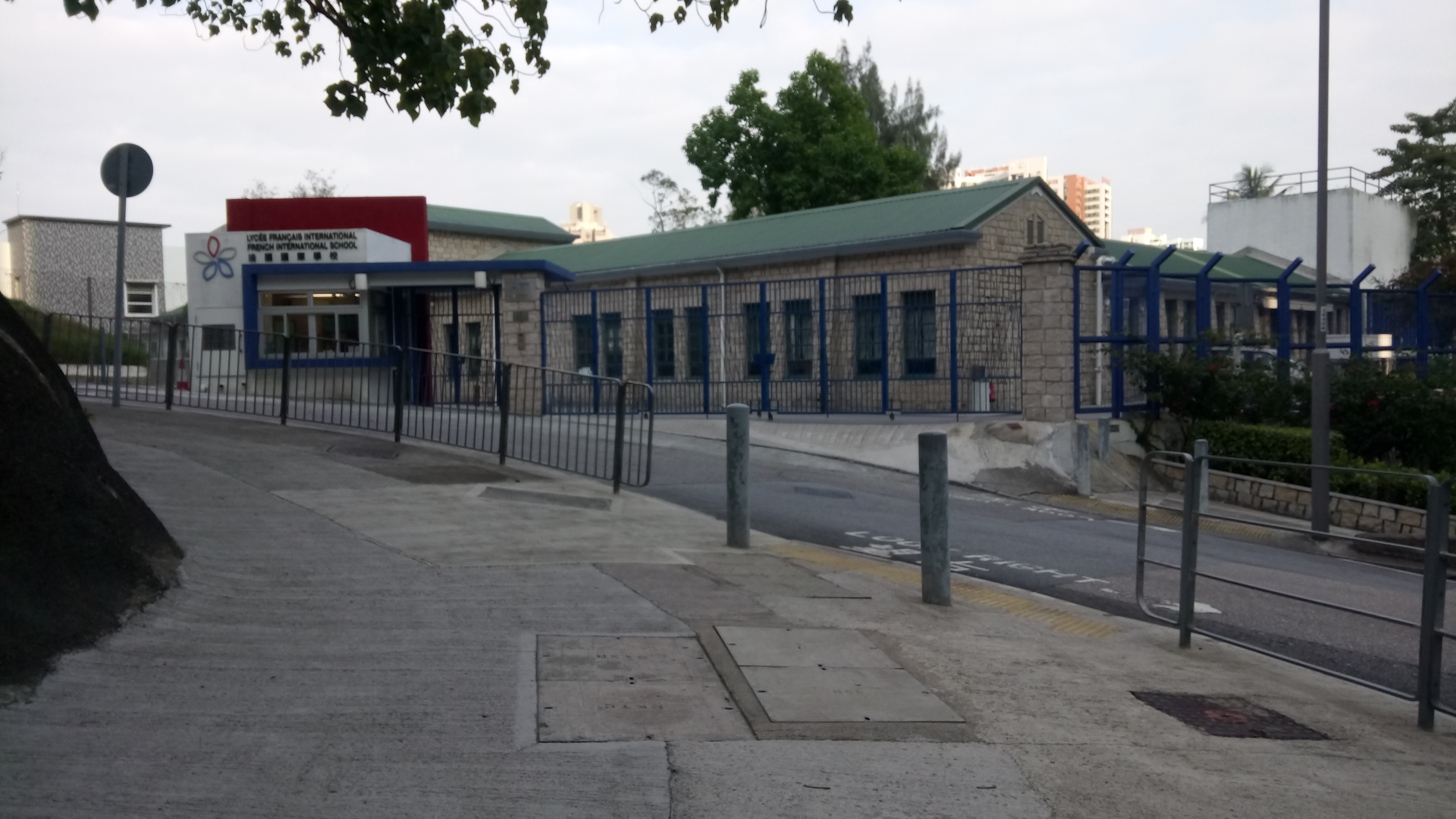
Chai Wan Campus

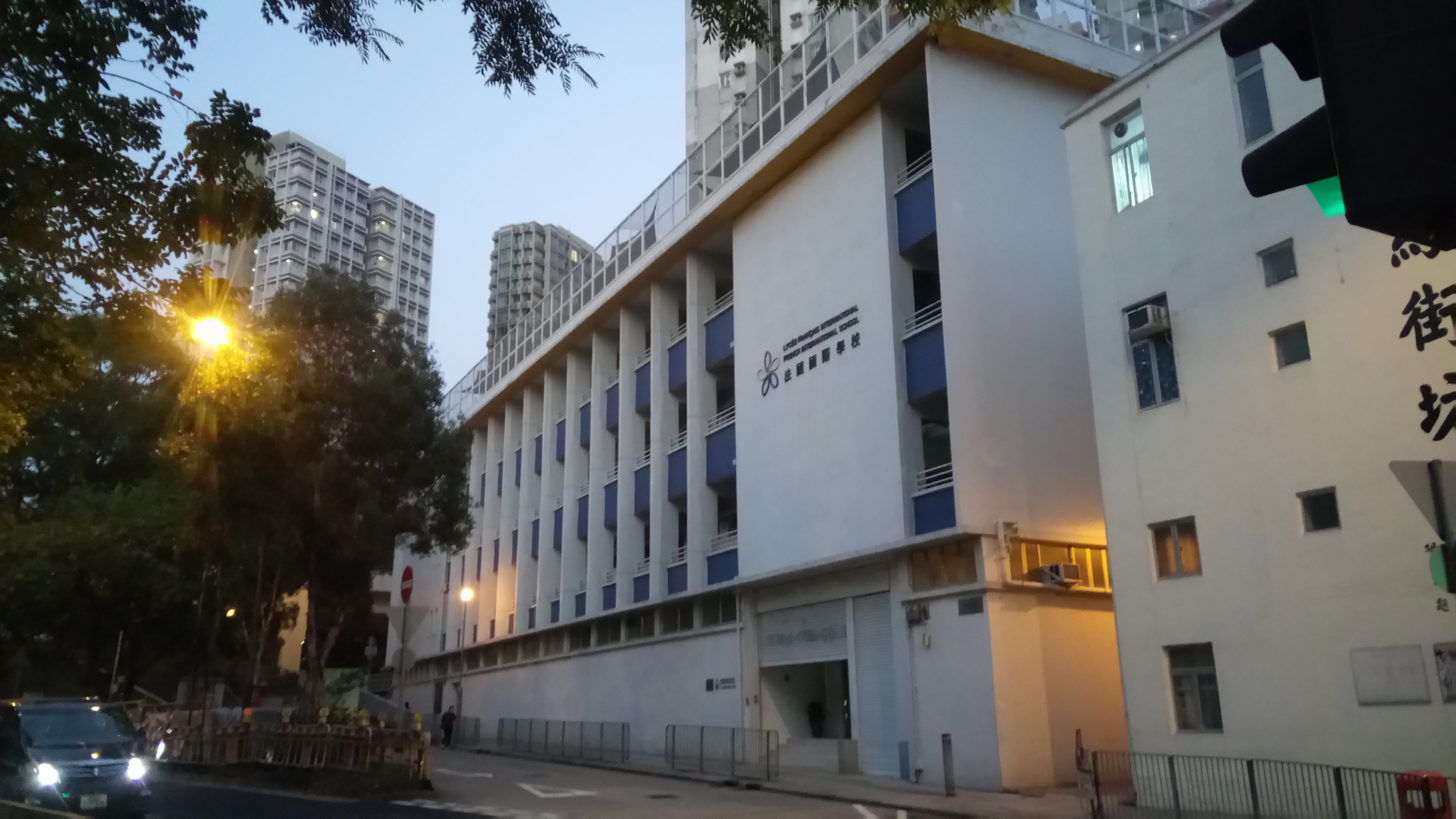
Hung Hom Campus (now closed)

The French International School of Hong Kong (FIS, French: Lycée français international Victor-Segalen) is an international school in Hong Kong which offers both English language and French Language medium instruction across its two educational streams. It was the first World IB School in Hong Kong. It is the only accredited French school in Hong Kong (Accreditation is provided through a partnership with the Agency for French Teaching Abroad (AEFE)). It has over 2,770 students in four different campuses. It has campuses in Happy Valley, Jardine's Lookout, Chai Wan Tseung Kwan O, closing the Hung Hom Campus.

FIS offers two streams, (International Stream, French Stream). The French stream follows the French National Education curriculum which leads to the "diplôme national du brevet" and the French "Baccalauréat". The "Option Internationale du Baccalauréat" (OIB) offers advanced level studies in English. The International stream is based on the British curriculum and leads to IGCSE (University of Cambridge International Examinations) in Form 5 and the International Baccalaureate (IB) in Form 6. FIS was the first international school in Hong Kong to offer an International Baccalaureate program in 1988.

== History ==
FIS was established in 1963, as French engineers and technicians arrived in Hong Kong to build the Shek Pik dam. It became one of the first internationals schools in Hong Kong and initially had 30 students. The original campus was a portion of a flat in Pok Fu Lam.

In 1973, FIS was the first international school to offer Mandarin classes to students.

Construction began on the Jardine's Lookout campus in 1982. The Hong Kong government donated the land to have the school built. In 1984, FIS established the Jardine's Lookout campus and opened the international stream. Classes began in September of that year.

Prior to 1988, the English medium stream only went up to the fifth form, with the General Certificate of Secondary Education being the end qualification. In 1988, FIS became the first international school in Hong Kong to be awarded the World IB status. The IB curriculum became available to the English medium stream and lengthened the course of study available to sixth form-equivalent students.

In 1994 the school was renamed after Victor Segalen.

In 1997 the school began building another campus. The Government of Hong Kong loaned $80 million, the Hong Kong Jockey Club Charities Trust donated $20 million, and the Government of France gave a grant for $15 million. The Hong Kong government loan did not collect interest. In March 1999, the newly constructed Blue Pool Road Secondary School campus was opened. It had a cost of $130 million.

In 2011, the Chai Wan campus was opened and was later recognised with a Green Building Award.

In 2018, the Tseung Kwan O eco-campus was opened.

== Difficulty of admissions ==
A 1990 SCMP article stated that the admissions process was competitive and that the Anglophone classes were more difficult to get into.

== Curriculum ==
As of 2025, language courses include French, English, Mandarin Chinese and Spanish. As of 2025, students must choose French and one other language when they get to Y7.

== Campuses ==
The Blue Pool Road Campus in Happy Valley houses the school administration and the secondary school. The 32-classroom facility has eight storeys. Three buildings house flats for employees. School buses are parked on the facility's roof. Other vehicles park in the basement.

The Jardine's Lookout Campus houses primary school classes. It has an auditorium with 310 seats. The swimming pool has a length of 25 metres (82 ft).

The Chai Wan Campus is located in the former Meng Tak Catholic School in Chai Wan; this campus opened in September 2011 and houses primary school students. A new campus in Area 67 of Tseung Kwan O is scheduled to open in 2018. The Tseung Kwan O campus houses early years through junior high school (collège).

Previously the Hung Hom Campus housed primary school students; it opened in September 2014, and was in Kowloon City District. The school once operated a Kindergarten campus in Shops 2–4 on the ground floor of Tung Fai Gardens (東暉花園) in Sheung Wan.

The TKO, or Tseung Kwan O campus, is a relatively new campus which houses primary students up to Y6. It opened in September 2018 and is on 28 Tong Yin St, Tseung Kwan O.

Campuses
Ones marked in red are closed

== Sport teams ==
Since 2009, FIS has had its own football, handball, basketball, netball and rugby teams.

== Governance ==
The French International School of Hong Kong is a not-for-profit, private enterprise under Hong Kong law and is managed by a Board. This Board comprises 13 volunteer members at most: 12 parents elected for 3 years and the Consulate General of France as well as invited members (representatives from the consulate, FIS and the French Chamber of Commerce). The Board members do not receive any financial compensation from FIS for their involvement.

== Notable alumni ==
- Camille Cheng
- Alexandre Dujardin
- Remi Dujardin
- Raphaël Merkies
- Christy Ren

== See also ==
- French people in Hong Kong
