= Henri Vetch =

French publisher active in China (1898–1976)

Henri Vetch (Chinese name: 魏智), born George Henry Archibald Campbell Vetch (1898–1976), was a French publisher active in China.

== History ==
He was born in La Celle-Saint-Cloud. His parents had different ethnic origins. A nanny, Mary Wright, helped raise him in his childhood. At one point, his parents divorced. He lived with his grandparents in the Seychelles in his teenage years.

His given name became spelled "Henri" versus "Henry" after he joined the French Army, which he was involved in during World War I. He worked as a soldier at the French diplomatic facility in Poland, but in 1920 was demobilized from this duty.

He went to China for the first time in 1920. Vetch's father, Francis Vetch (魏池), operated a publishing and bookstore business, called Librarie Française, which was based in the Grand Hôtel de Pékin and in the Wagon-Lits Hôtel (六國飯店). Geoffrey Bonsall, who had been a coworker of Vetch, stated that Vetch told him that he was, after the war, unsure of what steps to take next, and he went to China to get work. Additionally, there was a marriage that Vetch did not want to continue.

Vetch later took over the business his father had, after running it with his father for a time.

After moving to China, Vetch only visited Europe from time to time, and remained based in East Asia for the rest of his life.

In 1949 he was detained and accused of trying to kill Mao Zedong. While in prison he gained proficiency in Mandarin Chinese. The authorities released him in 1954 and sent him to British Hong Kong. He became the first head of the Hong Kong University Press in 1954 after Lindsay Ride vouched for him. In 1968 he retired from the post; he stayed in there past the customary age to retire.

After his retirement he created a book publishing company, Vetch and Lee Limited. Jason Wordie of the South China Morning Post described the company's catalog as "interesting and unusual".

Vetch died in Hong Kong in 1978. His burial took place in France.

== Works published ==
Reprinted books:

- On Chinese Music by J. A. Van Aalst.
- China Under the Empress Dowager, re-published by Vetch in Beijing in 1939

Robert Hans van Gulik wrote that, based on China Under the Empress Dowager and On Chinese Music, Vetch was "not always lucky in his choice of books for reprinting."

== See also ==
- French people in Hong Kong
