= Henriette Cappelaere =

French painter

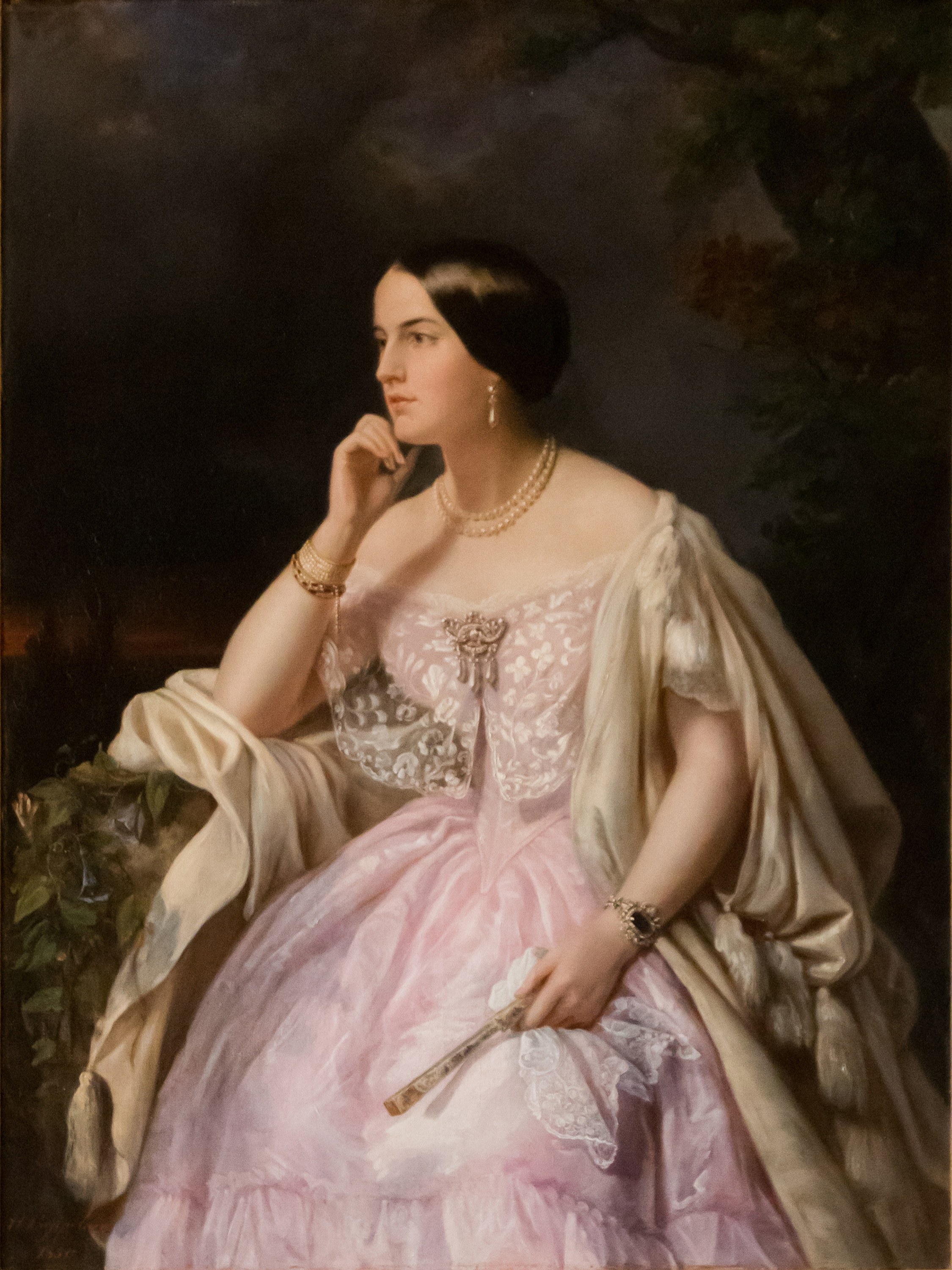
Portrait of Harriet Howard, 1850, oil on canvas, in the collection of the Château de Compiègne

Henriette Jacotte Cappelaere was a French painter active from 1846 until 1859.

Little is known of Cappelaere's life, although she warranted an entry in Émile Bellier de La Chavignerie's Dictionnaire Général des Artistes de l'école française depuis l'origine des arts du dessin jusqu'à nos jours in 1882. She was a native of Paris and a student of Léon Cogniet, and exhibited at the Paris Salons of 1846, 1848, 1849, and 1859. Her output consisted mainly of portraits, genre paintings, and paintings of dogs. In 1850 she lived at 22, rue Godot-de-Mauroy, which would later become part of the 9th arrondissement of Paris. That year she exhibited her best-known works at the Salon; one was a portrait of Harriet Howard, mistress of Napoleon III, and one was a painting of his dog, Ham. Today both pieces are in the collection of the Château de Compiègne.
