= Lycée Corneille (La Celle-Saint-Cloud) =

School in La Celle Saint-Cloud, France

Lycée Corneille is a senior high school/sixth form college located in La Celle-Saint-Cloud, Yvelines, France, in the Paris metropolitan area.

The school includes an international Anglophone section and various European sections.
