= Château de Beauregard (Isère) =

Château in Auvergne-Rhône-Alpes, France

Coordinates: 45.1714°N 5.6745°E

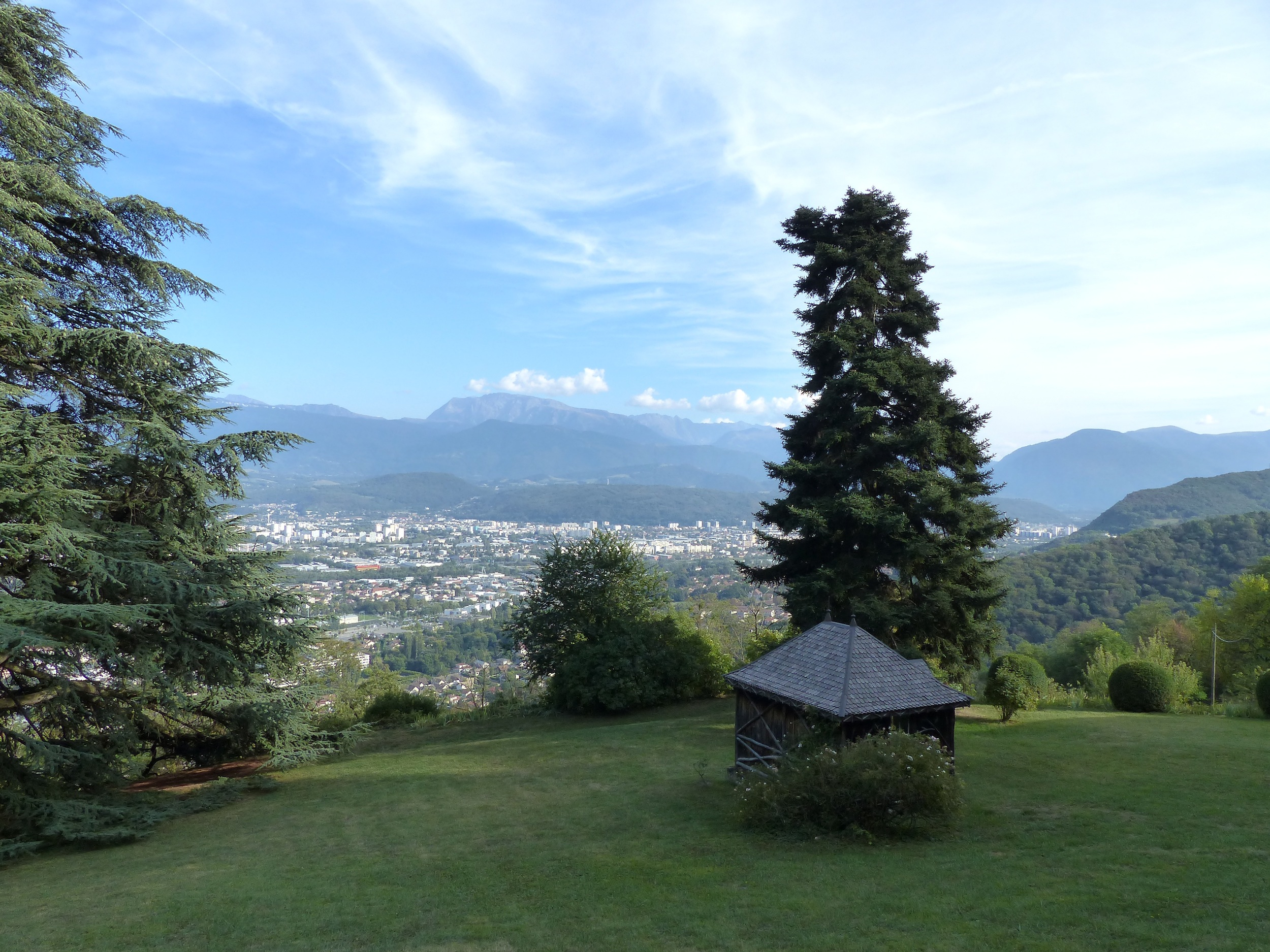
View from the château de Beauregard over the city of Grenoble.

The Château de Beauregard is an historic château in Seyssinet-Pariset, Isère, France. It was built in the 18th century. It has been listed as an official historical monument since December 15, 1997.
