= Harriet Howard =

Mistress and financial backer of Louis Napoleon, later Napoleon III of France

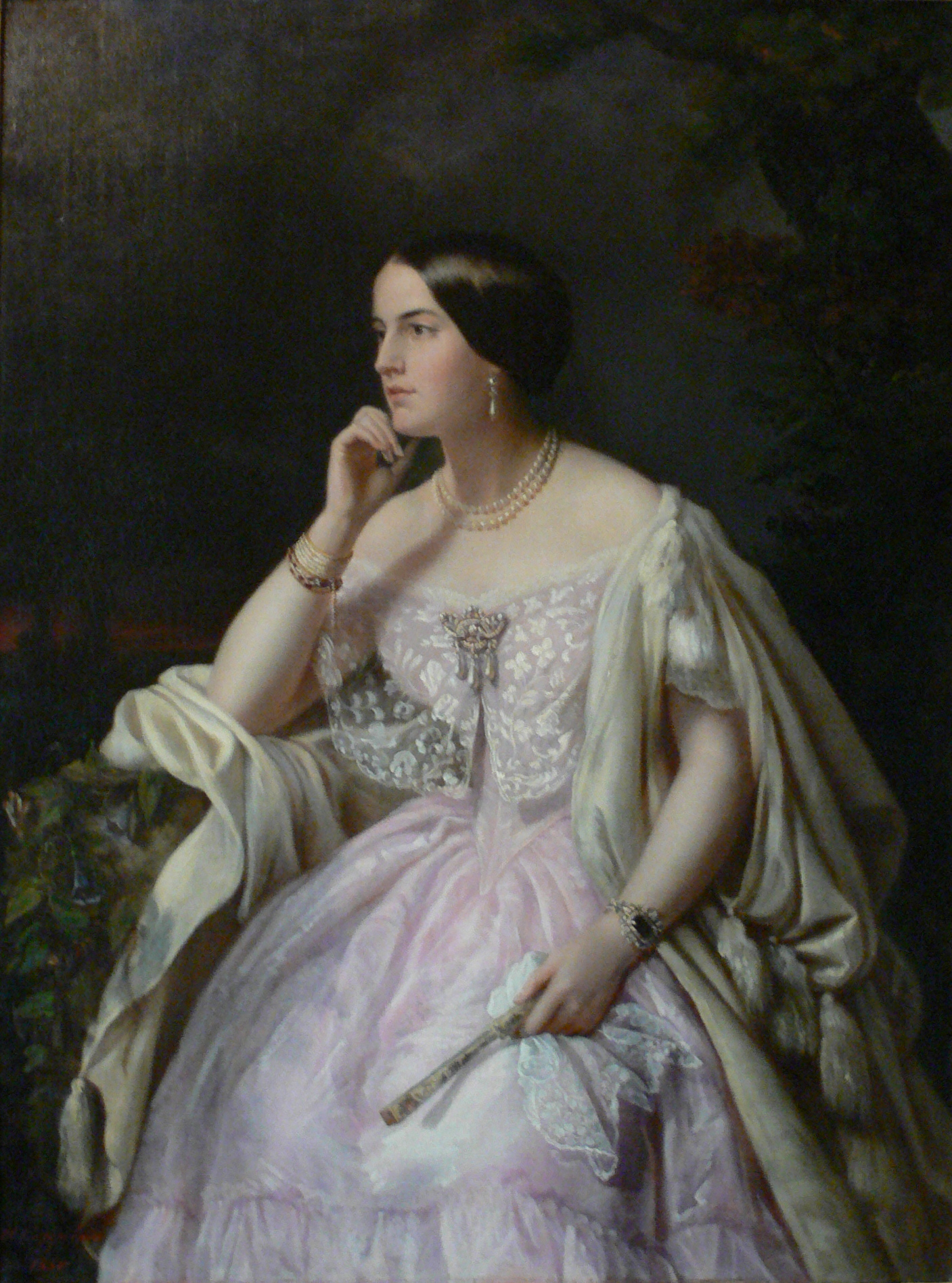
Henriette Cappelaere: Portrait of Elisabeth-Ann Haryett (Musée du Second Empire, Château de Compiègne)

Harriet Howard, born Elizabeth Ann Haryett (1823–1865) was a mistress and financial backer of Louis-Napoleon, later Napoleon III of France.

== London ==
Elizabeth Ann Haryett was the daughter of a boot-maker and the granddaughter of the owner of the Castle Hotel in Brighton. At the age of fifteen she ran off with Jem Mason, a well-known jockey, to live with him in London. As his redheaded mistress and an aspiring actress, she renamed herself "Harriet Howard" and was referred to as "Miss Howard". At the age of 18 she took as her next lover and patron the married Major Mountjoy Martyn of the Life Guards. Howard bore him a son, Martin Constantin Haryett, who at his baptism was presented as the child of her parents. The grateful Martyn bestowed a fortune on her and their son.

At a party given by Lady Blessington in 1846, Howard met Louis Napoleon, the Bonapartist pretender to the throne of France, at that time exiled in London. He moved in with her. With her wealth, she supported his efforts and conspiracies to return to France. Napoleon brought his two sons (Alexandre Louis Eugène and Louis Ernest Alexandre) – from an affair with Eléonore Vergeot during his 1840–1846 imprisonment at Ham – into the household, where they were educated along with Martin.

== Paris ==
In 1848 Napoleon returned to France and eventually became president. Howard with the three boys moved to the rue de Cirque adjacent to the Palais de l'Élysée, where she kept herself in the background as his mistress. She had a powerful enemy in Napoleon's cousin Princess Mathilde to whom he was once engaged (1836) and who also had supported him financially. Howard continued to support his aspirations to become emperor and largely financed his 1851 Coup d'état. One year later, after a confirming plebiscite, he became Napoleon III, Emperor of the French. Soon, he was on a search for an empress, and Howard found herself cast aside. Napoleon, after having been rejected by Carola of Vasa of Sweden and other high-standing members of the nobility, chose Eugenie de Montijo. Howard was sent away to Le Havre when Napoleon announced this marriage, and her secretary desk was emptied of its compromising letters.

== Countess de Beauregard ==
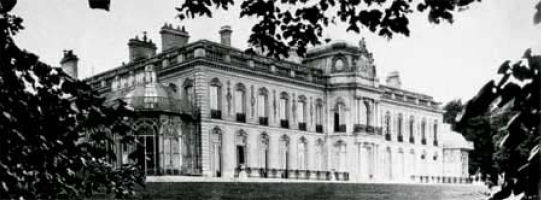
Château de Beauregard, La Celle St Cloud, pictured in 1872 when it was owned by Baron Maurice de Hirsch

Howard's fortune was built up again, as Napoleon repaid his financial obligations. She was given the title comtesse de Beauregard, owner of the Château de Beauregard near the main route between La Celle-Saint-Cloud and Versailles near Paris. Within six months of the marriage, Napoleon resumed his relationship with her. His wife, who found sex "disgusting", forbade him to see her, and he, being in need of an heir, had to submit.

Eventually in 1854, Howard married Captain Clarence Trelawny, an English horse breeder who used her money for his business. The two sons of Napoleon she helped to raise returned to their mother. However, Harriet and Clarence's marriage was difficult and did not last – they divorced in 1865, the same year she died.

The relationship to her son Martin was also strained – at his 21st birthday party, he asked her publicly: "Now that I'm grown, Mother, won't you tell me who my father was?". Martin was later made comte de Béchevêt by Napoleon III, married into Hungarian nobility and had three children, Richard Martyn Haryett de Béchevêt, Grisilde Charlotte Haryett de Béchevêt and Marianne Josephine Haryett de Béchevêt. When Martin died in 1907, his son Richard inherited his title.

She died in her château on 19 August 1865 at 6:30 pm. She is buried alongside her son in the cemetery of Le Chesnay, located less than 900 metres from the château (now almost totally destroyed).

== Sources ==
- Betty Kelen: The Mistresses. Domestic Scandals of Nineteenth-Century Monarchs. Random House, NY, 1966
- Simone Andre Maurois: Miss Howard and the Emperor. Knopf, 1958.
