= Château de la Celle =

Castle in La Celle-Saint-Cloud, France, reception site for the French Foreign Ministry

Coordinates: 48°51′07″N 2°08′26″E

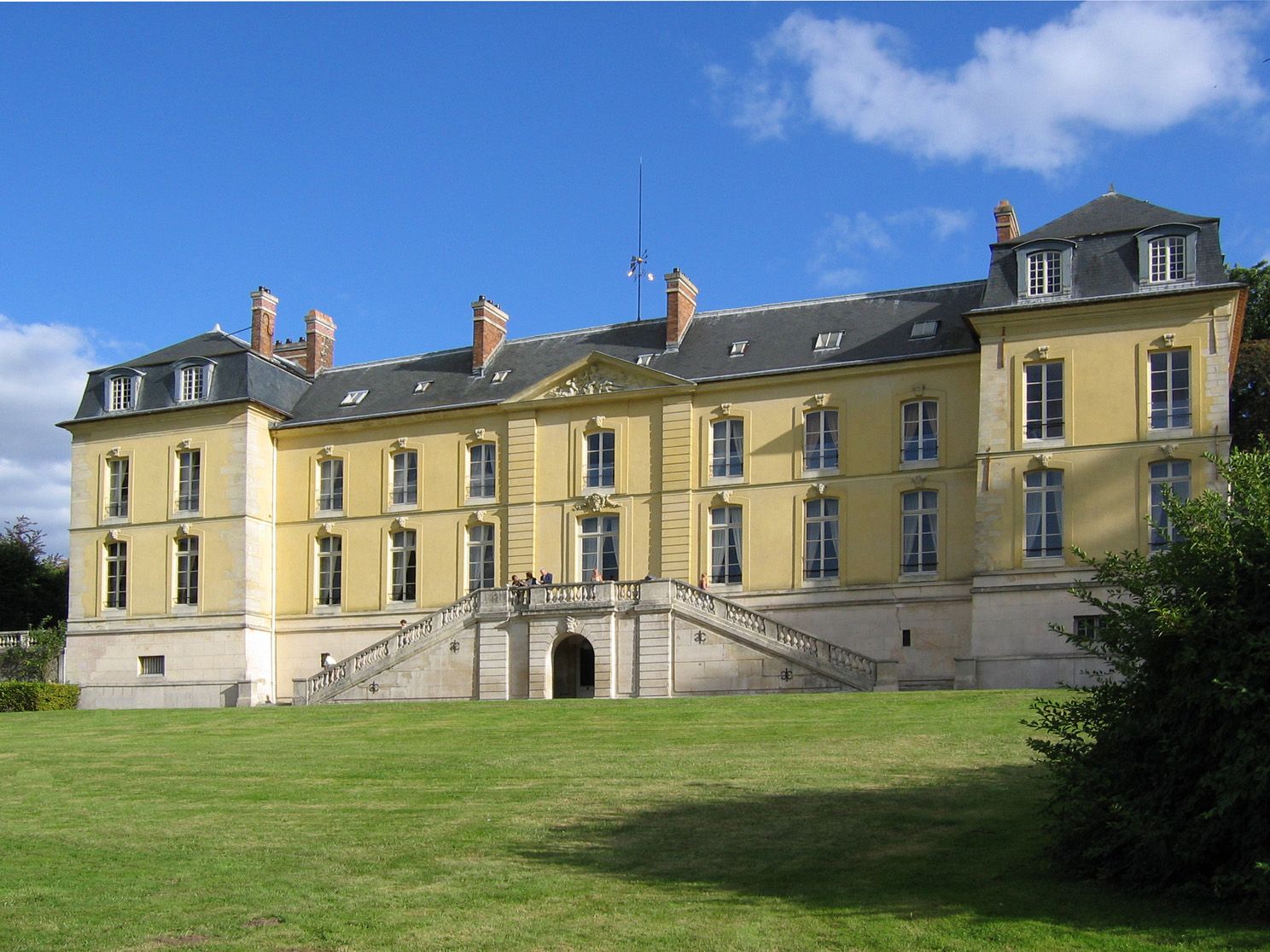
View from the park, 2004

The Château de la Celle (French pronunciation: [ʃɑto d(ə) la sɛl]), also named Château de La Celle Saint-Cloud or the Petit Château, is a historical building in the suburban commune of La Celle-Saint-Cloud, in the French department of Yvelines, west of Paris, 6 kilometres (3.7 mi) north of Versailles. It is owned by the Ministry of Foreign Affairs, which uses it as a diplomatic venue.
