= Payrac =

- Commune
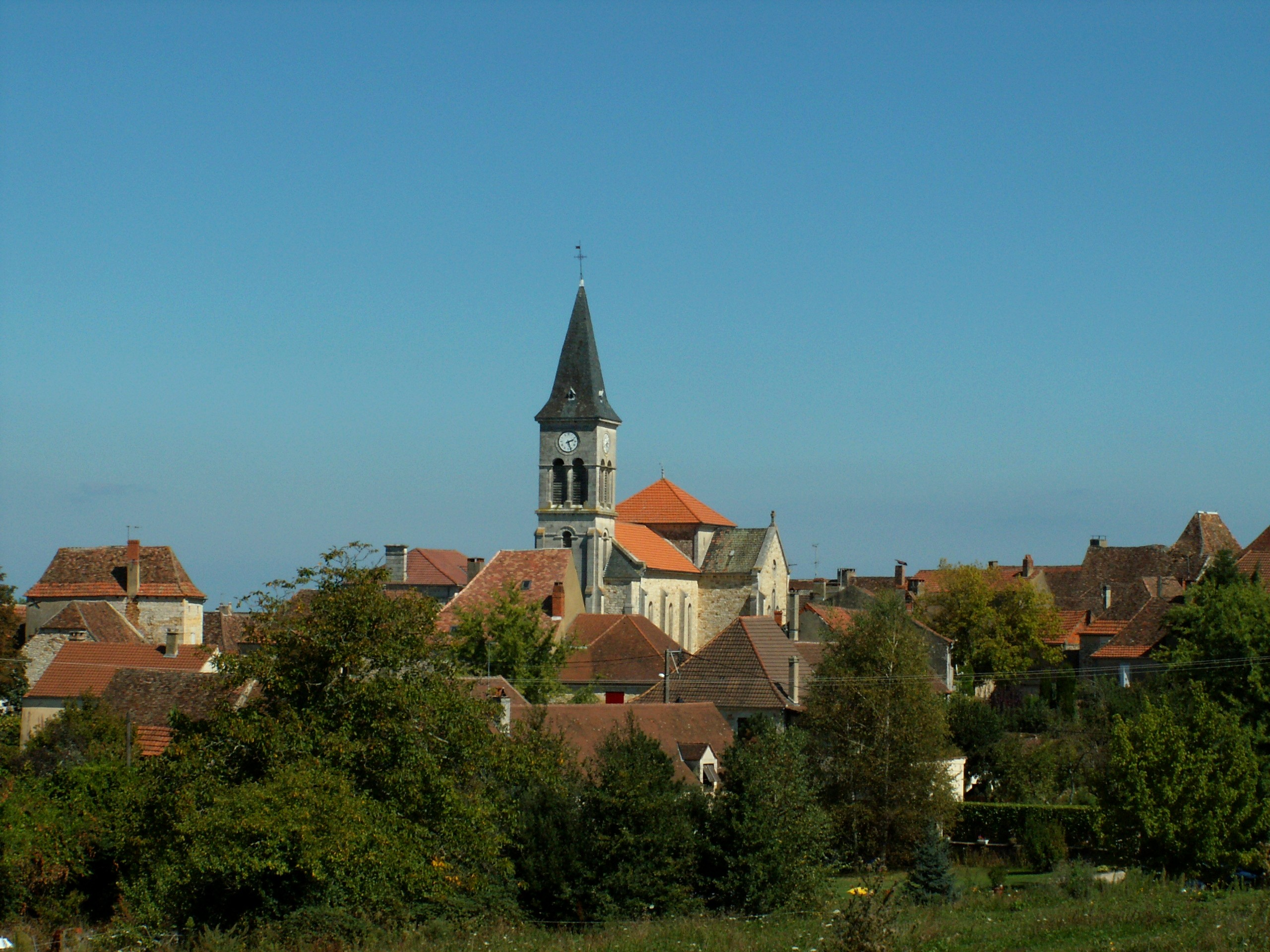
- A general view of Payrac
- Location of Payrac
- Location within France Location within Occitanie
- Coordinates: 44°47′51″N 1°28′22″E
- Country: France
- Region: Occitania
- Department: Lot
- Arrondissement: Gourdon
- Canton: Souillac
- Intercommunality: Causses et Vallée de la Dordogne

Government
  - Mayor (2020–2026): François Nadaud
- Area^{1}: 19.5 km^{2} (7.5 sq mi)
- Elevation: 280 m (920 ft)
- Highest elevation: 364 m (1,194 ft)
- Lowest elevation: 125 m (410 ft)
- Population (2023): 669
  - Density: 34.3/km^{2} (88.9/sq mi)
- Time zone: UTC+01:00 (CET)
  - Summer (DST): UTC+02:00 (CEST)
- INSEE/Postal code: 46215 /46350
- ^{1} French Land Register data, which excludes lakes, ponds, glaciers > 1 km^{2} (0.386 sq mi or 247 acres) and river estuaries.

Payrac (French pronunciation: [pɛʁak]; Occitan: Pairac) is a commune in the Lot department in south-western France. The inhabitants of Payrac are called "Payraçois" and "Payraçoises" in French.

== History ==
Payrac was an important town in the times of ancient Rome, but because of military campaigns and pillages from the Hundred Years' War and the Bubonic Plague, the town's population plummeted to the point where it was nearly uninhabited. Under the influence of lords, peasants moved to and repopulated Payrac.

In 1589, the Huguenot army ravaged Payrac and killed 500 people.

After this period, Payrac underwent an economic revival due to its strategic placement with Paris and Toulouse. Payrac did not undergo change during the Industrial Revolution, and as a result lost half its population.

== Population ==
Historical population

Year	Pop.	±% p.a.
1793	1,017	—
1800	909	−1.59%
1806	1,160	+4.15%
1821	1,786	+2.92%
1831	1,809	+0.13%
1836	1,911	+1.10%
1841	1,253	−8.10%
1846	1,267	+0.22%
1851	1,265	−0.03%
1856	1,290	+0.39%
1861	1,320	+0.46%
1866	1,255	−1.00%
1872	1,240	−0.20%
1876	1,222	−0.36%
1881	1,185	−0.61%
1886	1,179	−0.10%
1891	1,136	−0.74%
1896	1,069	−1.21%
1901	980	−1.72%

Year	Pop.	±% p.a.
1906	960	−0.41%
1911	968	+0.17%
1921	846	−1.34%
1926	816	−0.72%
1931	719	−2.50%
1936	687	−0.91%
1946	646	−0.61%
1954	580	−1.34%
1962	523	−1.28%
1968	512	−0.35%
1975	456	−1.64%
1982	448	−0.25%
1990	492	+1.18%
1999	564	+1.53%
2007	672	+2.21%
2012	639	−1.00%
2017	620	−0.60%
2023	669	+1.28%

Source: Cassini and INSEE

== See also ==
- Communes of the Lot department
