= Château de Beauregard, La Celle-Saint-Cloud =

Château in La Celle-Saint-Cloud in France

Coordinates: 48°50′26.90″N 2°07′27.40″E

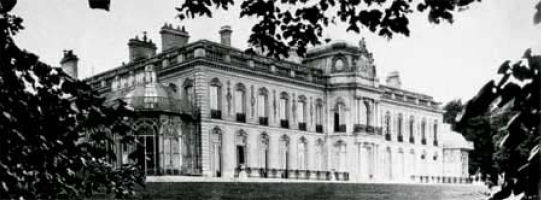
Château de Beauregard (north facade) in La Celle-Saint-Cloud, pictured in 1872 when it was owned by baron Maurice de Hirsch

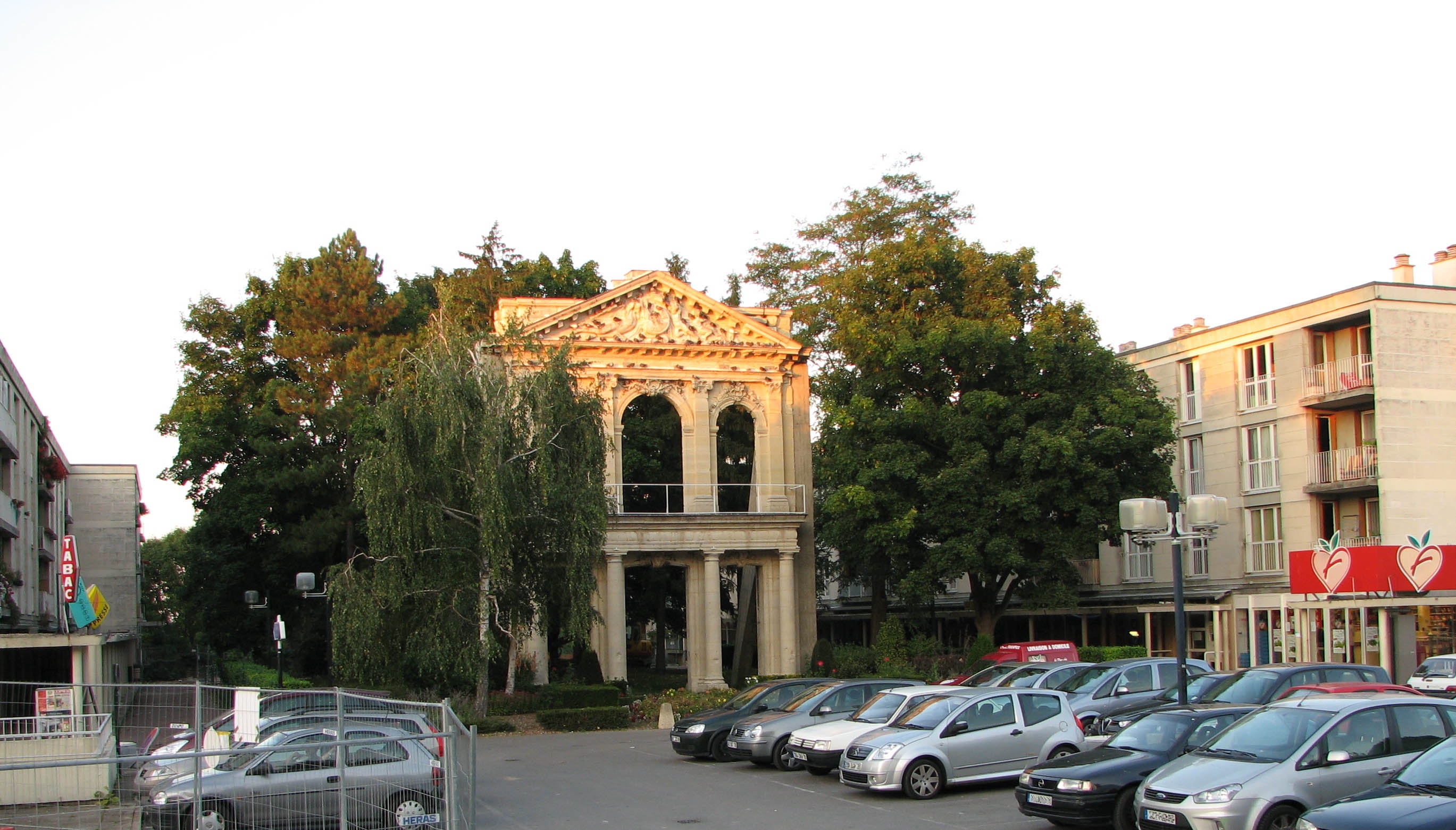
The front-core (south facade) in 2008

Château de Beauregard was a château in La Celle-Saint-Cloud, a suburb southwest of Paris, France, 5 km (3.1 mi) north of Versailles.

== History ==
The name of the domain seems to have its roots in the Middle Ages. The château was built on top of a hill between La Celle-Saint-Cloud and Le Chesnay. In the early 17th century, the house was owned by the du Val family. Later, the château was the property of the Montaigu family, which rented it. During the Revolution and Empire eras, ownership of the château changed often.

In the mid 19th century, Harriet Howard bought the house and its park. She also bought the Béchevet farm and the Bel-Ébat stud farm, marking a very large 184 ha property. The château was in poor condition; she rebuilt it in a neo-classical style. She also enclosed the whole area with a wall. From this château, she worked for the success of Louis-Napoleon Bonaparte (later Napoleon III), of whom she was mistress and financial backer. She died in 1865.

Her son Martin-Constantin Haryett, created comte de Béchevet by Napoléon III, was a spendthrift and had to sell the château in 1870 to the duchesse de Beauffremont. A few months later, the Franco-Prussian War broke out. The Prussians, installed in La Celle-Saint-Cloud, made Beauregard their headquarters and built some fortifications. The duchesse de Beauffremont was ruined and was not able to rehabilitate it, and the house was seized.

In 1872, it became the property of baron Maurice de Hirsch, who fully restored it. Although having a town house in rue de l'Élysée in Paris, he and his family frequently stayed at Beauregard. At his death in 1896, the château was bequeathed to Maurice Arnold de Forest, comte de Bendern (Liechtenstein title). He owned several properties across Europe and did not come often to Beauregard, leaving the château abandoned.

In 1939, there was a plan to install an auxiliary hospital, but the poor condition of the château did not allow it. It then became a military depot and was bombed in 1940. During the Occupation, the organisation Todt used it as a base, and then it became an annex of the Fresnes prison and a Soviet repatriation assembly camp.

After the war, Beauregard was in ruins. Its owner, the comte de Bendern, thought to transform it into a forest reserve open to the public, but he was not able to do it. He eventually gave Beauregard to the city of Paris in 1949 for social housing.

In 1956, the château ruins were cleared. Only the front-core (front door) still stands (but very deteriorated), surrounded by a group of buildings built in the late 1960s in the so-called Beauregard neighborhood, 300 m (980 ft) north of the A13 motorway.
