= Jean-Nicolas Beauregard =

French Jesuit (1733–1804)

- Born: 4 December 1733; Metz, Lorraine
- Died: 27 July 1804 (aged 70)
- Occupation: French priest

Jean-Nicolas Beauregard (4 December 1733 – 27 July 1804) was a Jesuit preacher, pulpit orator and émigré priest following the French Revolution, when he fled to London.

== Biography ==
Beauregard was born in Metz, Lorraine, France. After his noviceship and higher studies, he taught classics and rhetoric with distinction for six years at the colleges of the Society in Nancy, Verdun, Strasbourg, and Pont-a-Mousson. His theological studies, which followed, were made in Strasburg, and after the year of third probation, Beauregard was back at Nancy for the year 1766-67 as perfect of studies. The next year he was assigned to the task of preaching, which thenceforth became the work of his life.

Having gained a wonderful reputation in the lesser towns of France, he was summoned to Paris, where his success was even more phenomenal. Especially noteworthy was the course of sermons preached before the court during the Lent of 1789, in which Beauregard is said to have clearly foretold the evils that were about to engulf France.

Beauregard escaped the first terror of the revolution, but was forced to flee to London in 1794. Later on his established himself at Maestricht, then at Cologne, while his declining years were spent at the castle of the Princess Sophie of Hohenlohe-Bartenstein. He died at Gröningen, Germany.

== Works ==
His works consist of sermons and letters, mostly in manuscript form. A collection of his sermons, made by one of his hearers, was first printed at Paris in 1820, often reprinted, and later embodied in Migne's "Orateurs Sacrés", vol. LXXI.
