= La Celle-Saint-Cloud =

- Commune
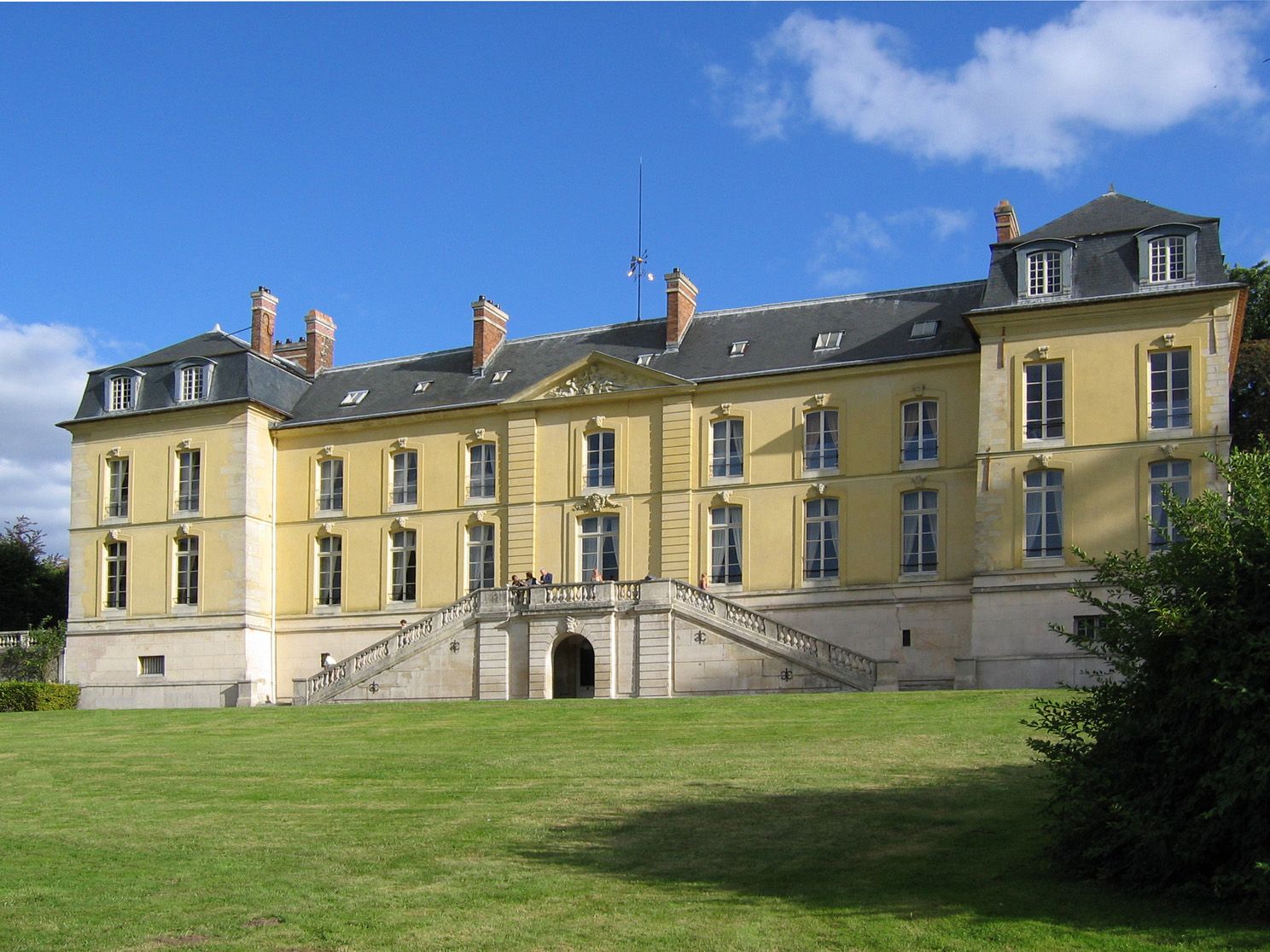
- The Château de la Celle, owned by the Ministry of Foreign Affairs and used for diplomatic receptions.

- Coat of arms

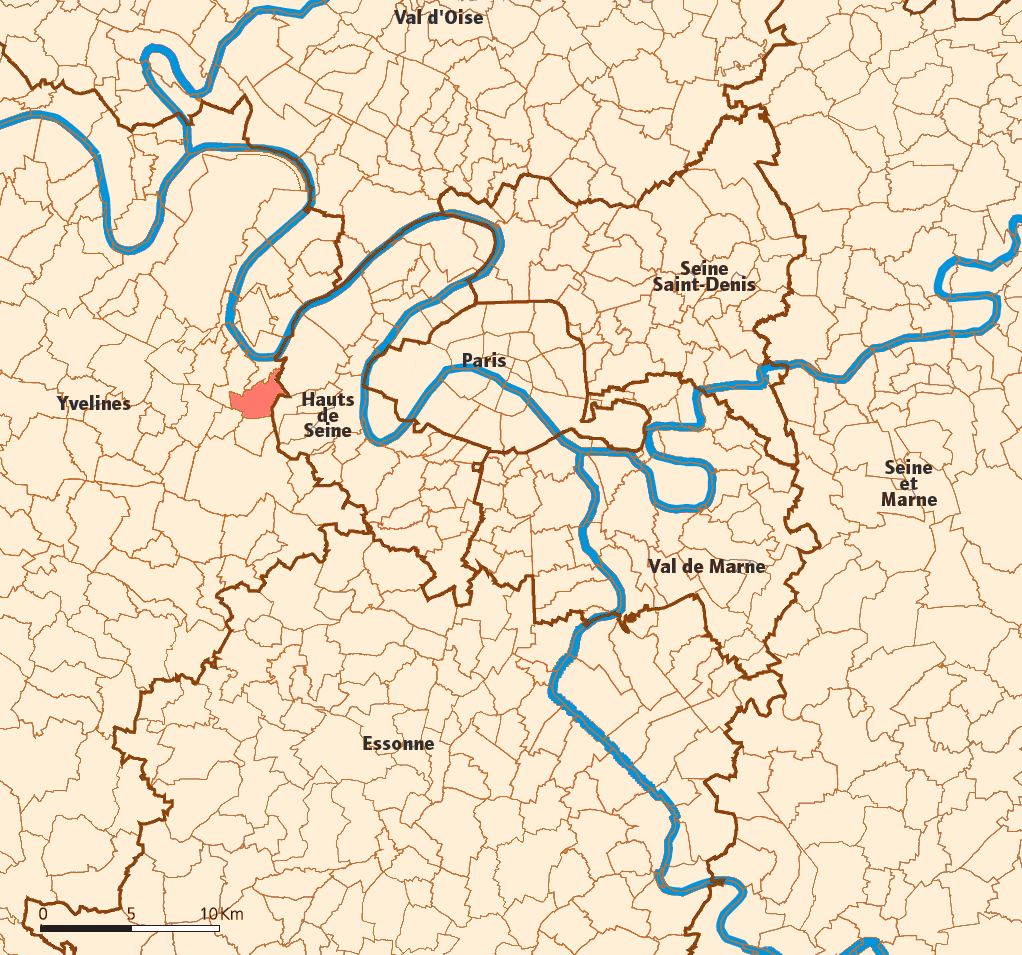
- Location (in red) within Paris inner and outer suburbs
- Location of La Celle-Saint-Cloud
- Location within France Location within Île-de-France (region)
- Coordinates: 48°50′28″N 2°08′04″E
- Country: France
- Region: Île-de-France
- Department: Yvelines
- Arrondissement: Versailles
- Canton: Le Chesnay-Rocquencourt
- Intercommunality: CA Versailles Grand Parc

Government
  - Mayor (2020–2026): Olivier Delaporte (DVC)
- Area^{1}: 5.82 km^{2} (2.25 sq mi)
- Population (2023): 20,460
  - Density: 3,520/km^{2} (9,110/sq mi)
- Time zone: UTC+01:00 (CET)
  - Summer (DST): UTC+02:00 (CEST)
- INSEE/Postal code: 78126 /78170
- Website: lacellesaintcloud.fr
- ^{1} French Land Register data, which excludes lakes, ponds, glaciers > 1 km^{2} (0.386 sq mi or 247 acres) and river estuaries.

La Celle-Saint-Cloud (French pronunciation: [la sɛl sɛ̃ klu]) is a commune in the Yvelines department in the Île-de-France region in Northern France. It is a western outer suburb of Paris, 15.6 km (9.7 mi) from its centre, on the departmental border with Hauts-de-Seine.

== History ==
The Hôtel de Ville

The Hôtel de Ville was completed in 1971.

== Demographics ==
Historical population

Year	Pop.	±% p.a.
1793	361	—
1800	329	−1.32%
1806	363	+1.65%
1821	340	−0.44%
1831	361	+0.60%
1836	365	+0.22%
1841	388	+1.23%
1846	416	+1.40%
1851	433	+0.80%
1856	460	+1.22%
1861	592	+5.18%
1866	616	+0.80%
1872	560	−1.58%
1876	663	+4.31%
1881	892	+6.11%
1886	821	−1.65%
1891	867	+1.10%
1896	910	+0.97%
1901	963	+1.14%

Year	Pop.	±% p.a.
1906	1,029	+1.33%
1911	1,093	+1.21%
1921	1,167	+0.66%
1926	1,534	+5.62%
1931	1,782	+3.04%
1936	2,043	+2.77%
1946	2,863	+3.43%
1954	5,018	+7.27%
1962	20,284	+19.08%
1968	24,687	+3.33%
1975	25,696	+0.57%
1982	23,326	−1.37%
1990	22,834	−0.27%
1999	21,527	−0.65%
2007	20,999	−0.31%
2012	21,132	+0.13%
2017	20,966	−0.16%
2023	20,460	−0.41%

Source: EHESS and INSEE (1968–2023)

== Transport ==
La Celle-Saint-Cloud is served by two stations on the Transilien Paris-Saint-Lazare suburban rail line: La Celle-Saint-Cloud and Bougival.

== Attractions ==
- The Château de la Celle, now property of the Ministry of Europe and Foreign Affairs
- The Château de Beauregard (only a fragment remains)
- The Pavillon du Butard

== Education ==
Public preschool and elementary schools in the commune:

- Groupe scolaire Jules Ferry
- Groupe scolaire Henri Dunant
- Groupe Scolaire Louis Pasteur
- Groupe Scolaire Morel de Vindé
- Groupe Scolaire Pierre et Marie Curie

Junior high schools:

- Collège Victor Hugo
- Collège Louis Pasteur

Senior high schools:

- Lycée Pierre Corneille
- Lycée Professionnel Lucien-René Duchesne
- Lycée Professionnel Jean-Baptiste Colbert

Private primary schools:

- École privée Sainte-Marie

== Notable people ==
- La Celle-Saint-Cloud is the birthplace of the noted Franco-British author Hilaire Belloc.
- It was the home of English actress Harriet Howard following her affair with Napoleon III. She owned the château de Beauregard, which was later owned by Maurice de Hirsch.
- Lucien-Rene Duchesne (1908–1984), mayor of La Celle-Saint-Cloud from 1959 to 1981.
- French actress and model Ludivine Sagnier (of Mesrine: Part 2 fame) is also a native of La Celle-Saint-Cloud.
- Since September 2014, politician Marine Le Pen has resided in the town.
- Henri Vetch was born in this town.

== See also ==
- Communes of the Yvelines department
