= Hong Kong University Press =

University publisher

- Parent company: University of Hong Kong
- Founded: 1956; 69 years ago
- Headquarters location: Hong Kong
- Distribution: SUP Publishing Logistics (Hong Kong); San Min Book Co. (Taiwan); APD Singapore (Singapore); MHM (Japan); Columbia University Press (the Americas, EMEA)
- Publication types: Books
- Official website: hkupress.hku.hk

Hong Kong University Press
- Traditional Chinese: 香港大學出版社
- Simplified Chinese: 香港大学出版社
Transcriptions
Standard Mandarin
- Hanyu Pinyin: Xiānggǎng Dàxué Chūbǎnshè
Yue: Cantonese
- Yale Romanization: Hēung góng daaih hohk chēut báan séh
- Jyutping: Hoeng^{1} gong^{2} daai^{6} hok^{6} ceot^{1} baan^{2} se^{5}

Hong Kong University Press (abbreviated as HKU Press) is the university press of the University of Hong Kong. It was established in 1956 and publishes more than 50 titles per year in both Chinese and English. Most works in English are on cultural studies, film and media studies, Chinese history and culture.

== Brief ==
Hong Kong University Press was established in 1956. At the beginning of the establishment, the press mainly published several books on studies done by the university's own faculty every year. It now releases between 30 and 60 new titles a year. All HKU Press publications are approved by a committee of HKU faculty and staff, which bases its decisions on the results of a rigorous peer-review process. HKU Press publishes most of its books (especially the academic books) in English and also brings out a lot of titles in Chinese. Also, since the first publication, HKU Press has used a bilingual (Chinese and English languages) publication program.

Authors originate from various countries on multiple continents. In all areas of Asian research, the research direction of publications is mainly based on cultural studies, film and media researches, and Chinese history and cultures. HKU Press also provides publications in law, education, social work, medicine, real estate, construction, linguistics, and language studies.

Henri Vetch was the first head of the press, taking that role from 1954 until 1968.
