= Eugenie Bonaparte =

Princess of France

- Born: 6 September 1872; Grottaferrata, Italy
- Died: 1 July 1949 (aged 76); Paris, France
- Spouse: Léon Napoléon Ney, 4th prince de La Moskowa (m. 1898; div. 1903)
Names
- Eugénie Laetitia Barbe Caroline Lucienne Marie Jeanne Bonaparte
- House: Bonaparte
- Father: Napoléon Charles Bonaparte, 5th Prince of Canino
- Mother: Maria Cristina Ruspoli

Eugénie Laetitia Bonaparte (Eugénie Laetitia Barbe Caroline Lucienne Marie Jeanne Bonaparte; 6 September 1872 – 1 July 1949) was the youngest daughter of Napoléon Charles Bonaparte, 5th Prince of Canino and Princess Maria Cristina Ruspoli.

== Early life ==
Eugénie was born in Grotta Ferrata, Italy. Her paternal grandparents were Prince Charles Lucien Bonaparte, son of Lucien Bonaparte and nephew of Emperor Napoleon I, and Princess Zénaïde Bonaparte, daughter of Joseph I of Spain and niece of Emperor Napoleon; thus she is his double grandniece.

She had two older sisters: Zénaïde Eugénie, who died aged two in 1862, ten years before Eugénie was born; and Marie Léonie, who was two years older, born 10 December 1870.

== Personal life ==
On 16 November 1898 in Rome she married Léon Napoléon Ney (1870–1928), 4th Prince de la Moskowa, son of Michel Aloys Ney, 3rd Duc d'Elchingen, but the marriage ended in divorce in 1903.

== Ancestry ==
Ancestors of Eugenie Bonaparte

16. Carlo Buonaparte
8. Lucien Bonaparte, 1st Prince of Canino and Musignano
17. Letizia Ramolino
4. Charles Lucien Bonaparte, 2nd Prince of Canino and Musignano
18. Charles Jacob de Bleschamp
9. Alexandrine de Bleschamp
19. Philiberte Bouvet
2. Napoléon Charles Bonaparte, 5th Prince of Canino and Musignano
20. Carlo Buonaparte (=16)
10. Joseph Bonaparte, King of Spain
21. Letizia Ramolino (=17)
5. Princess Zénaïde Bonaparte
22. François Clary
11. Julie Clary
23. Françoise Rose Somis
1. Eugenie Bonaparte, Princess de la Moskowa
24. Francesco Ruspoli, 3rd Prince of Cerveteri
12. Alessandro Ruspoli, 4th Prince of Cerveteri
25. Countess Leopoldina von Khevenhüller-Metsch
6. Giovanni Nepomucene Ruspoli, 5th Prince of Cerveteri
26. János, Count Esterházy de Galántha
13. Countess Mariana Esterházy de Galántha
27. Countess Agnes Banffy de Losonc
3. Donna Maria Cristina dei Principi Ruspoli
28. Francesco Camillo Massimo, 5th Marquess of Roccasecca
14. Camillo Massimo, 1st Prince of Arsoli
29. Donna Barbara Savelli Palombara dei Marchesi di Pietraforte
7. Donna Barbara dei Principi Massimo
30. Prince Francis Xavier of Saxony
15. Countess Maria Christina von der Lausitz
31. Countess Maria Chiara Spinucci
