= Lucien Bonaparte (disambiguation) =

Lucien Bonaparte was a French politician and diplomat of the French Revolution and the Consulate, and the younger brother of Napoleon Bonaparte.

Lucien Bonaparte may also refer to:

- Lucien Bonaparte (cardinal), grandson of the French politician and a cardinal created by Pope Pius IX
- Lucien Bonaparte (archdeacon), granduncle of the French politician, archdeacon of Ajaccio
- Lucien Bonaparte-Wyse, grandson of the French politician who was involved in the planning of the Panama Canal

== See also ==
- Lucien Bonaparte Chase, U.S. politician
- Lucien Bonaparte Webster, U.S. army officer
- Lucien Bonaparte Maxwell, U.S. rancher
- Lucien Bonaparte Caswell, U.S. lawyer
- Charles Lucien Bonaparte, son of the French politician and father of the cardinal, French naturalist and ornithologist
- Louis Lucien Bonaparte, son of the French politician, French philologist
- Joseph Lucien Bonaparte, son of the ornithologist
- Lucien Boneparte Covell House
