= Augusta Bonaparte Gabrielli =

Augusta
- Princess of Canino and Musignano, Princess Gabrielli
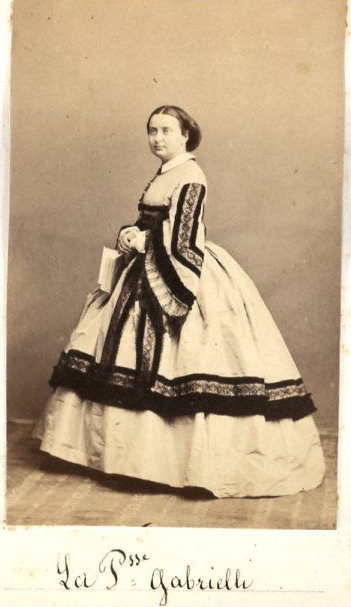
- Born: 9 November 1836; Rome, Papal States
- Died: 29 March 1900 (aged 63); Rome, Kingdom of Italy
- Burial: Chiesa della Strammetta (Santa Maria extra moenia), Prossedi
- Spouse: Placido Gabrielli (m. 1856)
- Augusta Amélie Maximilienne Jacqueline Bonaparte
- House: Bonaparte
- Father: Charles Lucien Bonaparte
- Mother: Zénaïde Bonaparte

Augusta Amélie Maximilienne Jacqueline Bonaparte (9 November 1836 – 29 March 1900) was a French-Italian Napoleonic princess.

== Biography ==
Augusta was born at Villa Bonaparte in Rome, the daughter of Charles Lucien Bonaparte, 2nd prince of Canino and Musignano, and Zénaïde Bonaparte, who had been Infanta of Spain as the daughter of Joseph Bonaparte.

She was privately educated. In 1855, on the occasion of her engagement to her cousin Placido Gabrielli, prince of Prossedi, her father, the famed ornithologist, named the emerald dove of the Nicobar Islands in her honour. The Chalcophaps indica augusta (Bonaparte, 1855) is also known as Princess Gabrielli's dove. A few months later, on 1 February 1856, Augusta and Placido (himself the son of princess Charlotte Bonaparte Gabrielli) celebrated their marriage in the Chapelle Impériale of the Palais des Tuileries in Paris. Napoleon III and Empress Eugénie attended the ceremony.

Placido and Augusta were included in the Famille civile of the emperor and in the civil list, receiving a yearly allowance of 6,250 francs from the French Government. They resided in Paris at the Hôtel de Besenval, at 142 Rue de Grenelle, and frequently attended events hosted by the Imperial family. Augusta was particularly attached to the Prince Impérial and upon his death in 1879 received several of his personal belongings from empress Eugénie.

After 1870, Placido and Augusta, who had no children, moved to Rome. In the newly-proclaimed Italian capital Augusta was renown for her dedication to the poor and for the charity fairs she organized at her residence at Palazzo di Monte Giordano. She also helped the rural populations of her husband's fiefs in southern Latium (Prossedi, Roccasecca and Pisterzo). Nowadays, Prossedi's main road is dedicated to her as via Principessa Augusta Gabrielli. She also worked at the catalogue of her husband's family painting collections and decorated several rooms of her Roman residence: when a new tower was added to the palace, Placido dedicated it to her as Torre Augusta. She also hosted her brother, cardinal Lucien Bonaparte at Palazzo Gabrielli, where he died in 1895. When the building was sold in 1888, most furnishings were donated to the couple's cousin Giuseppe Primoli and are now included in the collections of the Museo Napoleonico in Rome. The donations included her mother-in-law's portrait by Jean-Baptiste Wicar (Carlotta Bonaparte Gabrielli as a young peasant woman).

Augusta's last years were affected by poor health and she died in Rome aged 63. She was buried in Prossedi in a chapel decorated by her nephew count Napoleone Parisani.
