= Succession to the former French throne (Bonapartist) =

Transfer of French royal power

Coat of arms of the First French Empire

The succession to the throne of the French Empire was vested by Bonapartist emperors in the descendants and selected male relatives of Napoleon I (r. 1804–1814/15). Following the end of the Second French Empire in 1870, Bonapartist pretenders descended from Napoleon I's brothers have maintained theoretical claims to the imperial office.

== Origins of the French Empire ==
The French Empire formally existed during two periods when the head of the French state was a monarch who held the title of Emperor of the French.

The First French Empire was the regime established by Napoleon I in France. This empire lasted from 1804 to 1814, from the Consulate of the French First Republic to the Bourbon Restoration, and was briefly restored during the Hundred Days in 1815.

The Second French Empire was the regime established in France by Napoleon III from 1852 to 1870, between the French Second Republic and the French Third Republic. Napoleon III was the third son of Louis Bonaparte, a younger brother of Napoleon I, and Hortense de Beauharnais, the daughter of Napoleon I's wife, Joséphine de Beauharnais, by her first marriage.

Bonapartism had its followers from 1815 onward among those who never accepted the defeat at Waterloo or the Congress of Vienna. Napoleon I's death in exile on Saint Helena in 1821 only transferred the allegiance of many of his loyalists to other members of the House of Bonaparte.

After the death in 1832 of Napoleon I's son, known to Bonapartists as Napoleon II, Bonapartist hopes rested in several different members of the family.

The disturbances of 1848 gave this group hope. Bonapartists were essential in the election of Napoleon I's nephew Louis-Napoléon Bonaparte as president of the Second Republic. They also gave him crucial political support for the 1852 coup d'état, which overthrew the Republic and paved the way for the proclamation of the Second French Empire the following year, with Napoleon III as emperor.

In 1870, Napoleon III led France to a disastrous defeat at the hands of Prussia in the Franco-Prussian War, and he subsequently abdicated.

Following the definite overthrow of the Second Empire, the Third Republic was established. Bonapartism faded from a civic faith and monarchist bloc to an obscure predilection, more akin to a hobby than a practical political philosophy or movement. The death knell for Bonapartism was probably sounded when Louis-Napoléon Bonaparte, the only son of Napoleon III, was killed in action while serving as a British Army officer in Zululand in 1879. Thereafter, Bonapartism ceased to be a political force.

== First Napoleonic law of succession ==
The law of succession that Napoleon I established on becoming emperor in 1804 provided that the imperial throne should pass firstly to Napoleon's own legitimate male descendants through the male line, to the perpetual exclusion of women.

It further provided that if Napoleon's own direct line died out, the claim passed first to his older brother Joseph Bonaparte and to his legitimate male descendants through the male line, then to his younger brother Louis and his legitimate male descendants through the male line. His other brothers, Lucien and Jérôme, and their descendants, were omitted from the succession, even though Lucien was older than Louis, because they had politically defied the emperor, made marriages of which he disapproved, or both.

Upon the extinction of legitimate natural and adopted male, agnatic descendants of Napoleon I, and those of two of his brothers, Joseph and Louis, the throne was to be awarded to a man selected by the non-dynastic princely and ducal dignitaries of the empire, as ratified by a plebiscite.

At the time the law of succession was decreed, Napoleon I had no legitimate sons, and it seemed unlikely that he would have any due to the age of his wife, Joséphine de Beauharnais. His eventual response was to have his marriage to Joséphine annulled and to undertake a second marriage with Roman Catholic rites to Archduchess Marie Louise, daughter of Emperor Francis I of Austria. Their only child was Napoleon, King of Rome, known in exile as "Napoleon II" and as the Duke of Reichstadt. He died unmarried, thereby extinguishing the legitimate descent of Napoleon I.

== Second Napoleonic law of succession ==
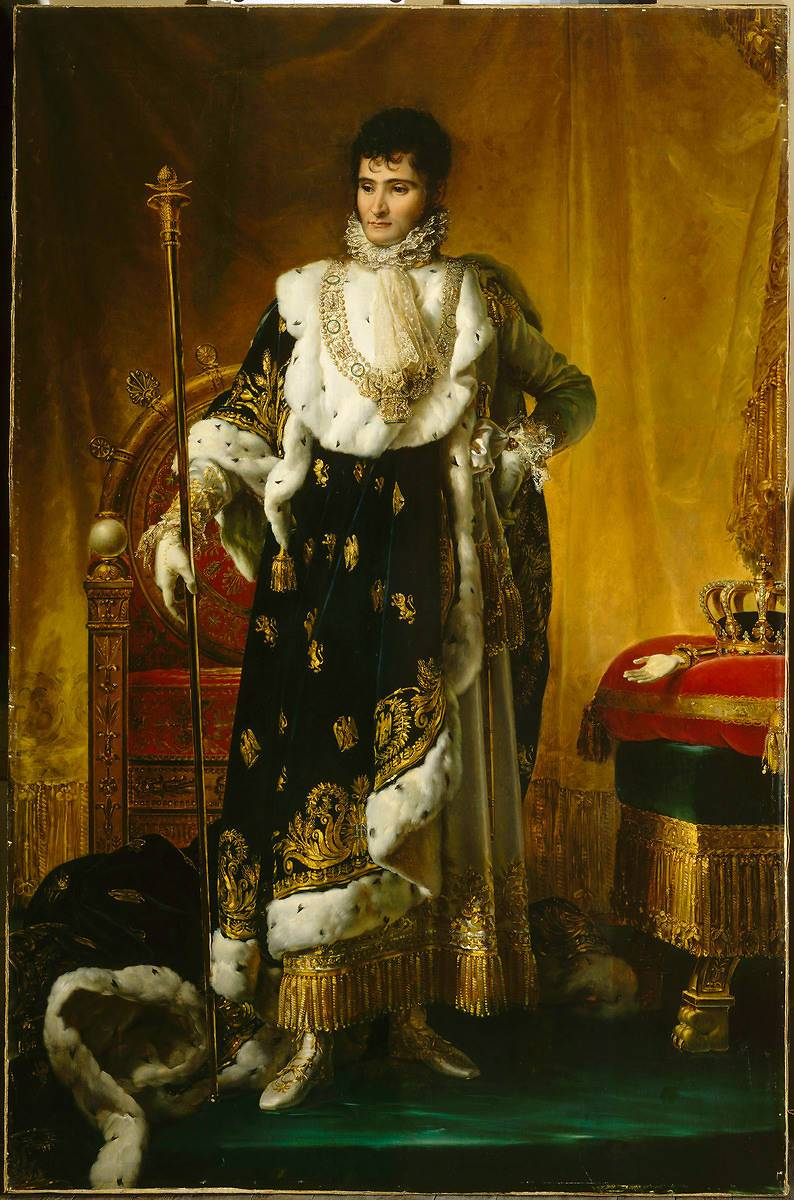
Portrait of Jérôme Bonaparte by François Gérard, 1811. Jérôme Bonaparte, King of Westphalia, progenitor of the current Bonapartist dynastic line.

Meanwhile, Napoleon I's older brother, Joseph, recognised upon establishment of the First Empire as first in line to succeed and (after the birth of the King of Rome) as second in line, died on 28 July 1844 without ever having had a legitimate son. Two of Joseph's three legitimate surviving daughters married, in exile, nephews of Napoleon I. (Note: Zénaïde Bonaparte (1801-1854) married in 1822 Charles Lucien Bonaparte, a son of Lucien Bonaparte; their son Joseph Lucien Bonaparte (1824-1865) became the senior male-line (but non-dynastic) descendant of Carlo Buonaparte on the death of Charles Lucien Bonaparte in 1857.; Charlotte Bonaparte (1802-1839) married in 1826 Napoléon Louis Bonaparte (1804-1831), the elder surviving son of Louis Bonaparte (and brother of Louis-Napoleon, the future emperor Napoleon III), but bore him no children.) However, when the Bonaparte dynasty was restored to power in France after the coup d'état of December 1851, male-line inheritance as prescribed by Napoleon I prevailed, and the man who became Emperor of the French in December 1852 as Napoleon III was not only the author of the 1851 coup, but also the only surviving legitimate son of Napoleon I's younger brother Louis Bonaparte (who had reigned as the King of Holland from 1806 to 1810).

In December 1852, with the imperial crown on his head, Napoleon III, still a bachelor, exercised the authority granted him by a decree in the form of a Sénatus-consulte (and confirmed by plebiscite), to enact a new organic law on the succession (in the event he himself were to leave no legitimate descendants). Napoleon III recognised Napoleon I's last surviving brother, Jérôme, as the heir presumptive. (During Napoleon I's reign, Jérôme had been one of the Bonaparte brothers who was bypassed in the order of succession, his first marriage having been an elopement with the American commoner Elizabeth Patterson over the emperor's objections. The Second Empire, however, empowered the new emperor to choose an heir among any of Napoleon I's nephews.) After Jérôme came Jérôme's male descendants by his second, dynastic marriage to Princess Catharina of Württemberg.

Napoleon III, hitherto a bachelor, began to look for a wife to produce a legitimate heir. Most of the royal families of Europe were unwilling to intermarry with the parvenu House of Bonaparte. After several rebuffs, including from Princess Carola of Sweden and Princess Adelaide von Hohenlohe-Langenburg, Napoleon III decided to lower his sights somewhat and marry for love instead, choosing Countess of Teba, Eugénie de Montijo, a Spanish noblewoman who had been brought up in Paris.

In 1856, Eugénie gave birth to a legitimate son and heir, Napoléon Eugène Louis, the Prince Imperial who, upon his father's defeat in battle and deposition in September 1870, went into exile. He became the claimant to the throne of the Second Empire when his father died in 1873. Like the King of Rome, the Prince Imperial died unwed and childless. All Bonapartist claimants since 1879 have been descendants of Jérôme Bonaparte in the male line.

== List of Bonapartist claimants to the French throne ==
This branch of claimants was established by Napoleon Joseph Charles Bonaparte, nicknamed Plon-Plon. He was the only legitimate male descendant of Jérôme Bonaparte from his second marriage to Princess Catharina of Württemberg. He married Princess Clothilde of Savoy and died in 1891. His son, Victor, Prince Napoléon, the next claimant, wed Princess Clémentine of Belgium, and died in 1926.

He was succeeded by his son, Louis Jérôme Bonaparte, husband of Alix de Foresta, daughter of Count Albéric de Foresta, who died in 1997. He was succeeded by his son, Charles Marie Jérôme Victor Napoléon Bonaparte. He married, civilly, Princess Béatrice of Bourbon-Two Sicilies, from whom he was divorced, being subsequently declared excluded as Napoleonic heir in his father's will for divorcing her and remarrying a commoner without paternal permission. His heir apparent (recognised by some as head of the House of Bonaparte since 1997) is his son, Jean-Christophe Napoléon.

There are no surviving descendants in the legitimate male line of any of Napoleon's brothers except Jérôme. This branch of the House of Bonaparte is recognised by Bonapartists as Napoleon I's dynastic heirs, being excluded from residence in France or service in its military by law, along with the heads of the House of Orléans, between 1883 and 1950.

The head and dynastic members of the family bear the title of Prince with the name Napoléon (Bonaparte) and the style of Imperial Highness.

Claimant	Portrait	Birth	Marriages	Death	Claim
Napoleon I 1814–1815; 1815-1821 (Emperor of the French twice: 1st 1804–1814, 2nd Mar-Jun 1815)		15 August 1769, Ajaccio son of Carlo Buonaparte and Letizia Ramolino	• Joséphine de Beauharnais; 9 March 1796; No children • Marie Louise of Parma; 11 March 1810; 1 son	5 May 1821; Saint Helena aged 51	Declared Emperor of the French on May 18, 1804
Napoléon François, King of Rome (Napoleon II); 1821–1832		20 March 1811, Paris son of Napoleon I and Marie Louise of Parma	Unmarried	22 July 1832; Vienna aged 21	Son of Napoleon I
Joseph, Count of Survilliers (Joseph I); 1832–1844		7 January 1768, Corte son of Carlo Buonaparte and Letizia Ramolino	Julie Clary; 1 August 1794; 2 children	28 July 1844; Florence aged 76	Brother of Napoleon I, uncle of Napoleon II
Louis, Count of Saint-Leu (Louis I); 1844–1846		2 September 1778, Ajaccio son of Carlo Buonaparte and Letizia Ramolino	Hortense de Beauharnais; 4 January 1802; 3 children	25 July 1846; Livorno aged 67	Brother of Joseph I
Napoleon III; 1846–1852; 1870–1873 (Emperor of the French, 1852–1870)		20 April 1808, Paris son of Louis, Count of Saint-Leu and Hortense de Beauharnais	Eugénie de Montijo; 29 January 1853; 1 son	9 January 1873; Chislehurst, London aged 64	Son of Louis I
Napoléon, Prince Imperial (Napoleon IV); 1873–1879		16 March 1856, Paris son of Napoleon III and Eugénie de Montijo	Unmarried	1 June 1879; Zulu Kingdom (present-day KwaZulu-Natal) aged 23	Son of Napoleon III
Victor, Prince Napoléon (Napoleon V); 1879–1926		18 July 1862, Paris son of Jérôme, Prince Napoléon and Maria Clotilde of Savoy	Clémentine of Belgium; 10 November 1910; 2 children	3 May 1926; Brussels aged 63	Grandnephew of Napoleon I, 2nd cousin of Napoleon IV
Louis, Prince Napoléon (Napoleon VI); 1926–1997		23 January 1914, Brussels son of Prince Victor Napoléon and Clémentine of Belgium	Alix de Foresta; 16 August 1949; 4 children	3 May 1997; Prangins aged 83	Son of Napoleon V
Charles, Prince Napoléon (Napoleon VII); 1997-present (disputed)		19 October 1950, Boulogne-Billancourt son of Prince Louis Napoléon and Alix de Foresta	• Princess Béatrice of Bourbon-Two Sicilies; 19 December 1978; 2 children • Jeanne-Françoise Valliccioni; 28 September 1996; 2 children, 1 adopted		Son of Napoleon VI
Jean-Christophe, Prince Napoléon (Napoleon VIII); 1997–present (disputed)		11 July 1986, Saint-Raphaël son of Charles, Prince Napoléon and Béatrice of Bourbon-Two Sicilies	Countess Olympia von und zu Arco-Zinneberg; 17 October 2019; 1 son		Grandson of Napoleon VI

== Line of succession ==
- Carlo Buonaparte (1746–1785)
  - Napoleon I (1769–1821)
    - Napoleon II (1811–1832)
  - Joseph Bonaparte (1768-1844)
  - Louis Bonaparte (1778–1846)
    - Napoleon III (1808-1873)
      - Napoléon, Prince Imperial (1856-1879)
  - Jérôme Bonaparte (1784–1860)
    - Napoléon Jérôme, Prince of Montfort (1822-1891); passed over in his cousin's will
      - Victor, Prince Napoléon (1862-1926)
        - Louis, Prince Napoléon (1914-1997)
          - Charles, Prince Napoléon (b. 1950)
            - (1) Jean-Christophe, Prince Napoléon (b. 1986)
              - (2) Prince Louis Napoléon (b. 2022)
          - (3) Prince Jérôme Napoléon (b. 1957)

== See also ==
- Legitimism
- Orléanism
- Succession to the French throne
