= Mary Bonaparte =

French princess

- Born: 10 December 1870
- Died: 1947 (aged 76–77)
- Spouse: Enrico Gotti (m. 1891)
Names
- Mary Léonie Eugénie Mathilde Jeanne Julie Zénaïde Bonaparte
- House: Bonaparte
- Father: Napoléon Charles Bonaparte, 5th Prince of Canino
- Mother: Maria Cristina Ruspoli

Mary Bonaparte (Mary Léonie Eugénie Mathilde Jeanne Julie Zénaïde Bonaparte; 10 December 1870 – 1947) was the eldest surviving daughter of Prince Napoléon Bonaparte of Canino and Christine Ruspoli. On 25 November 1891 in Rome she married Enrico Gotti. They had no children.

== Ancestry ==
Ancestors of Mary Bonaparte

16. Carlo Buonaparte
8. Lucien Bonaparte, 1st Prince of Canino and Musignano
17. Letizia Ramolino
4. Charles Lucien Bonaparte, 2nd Prince of Canino and Musignano
18. Charles Jacob de Bleschamp
9. Alexandrine de Bleschamp
19. Philiberte Bouvet
2. Napoléon Charles Bonaparte, 5th Prince of Canino and Musignano
20. Carlo Buonaparte (=16)
10. Joseph Bonaparte, King of Spain
21. Letizia Ramolino (=17)
5. Princess Zénaïde Bonaparte
22. François Clary
11. Julie Clary
23. Françoise Rose Somis
1. Princess Marie Léonie Bonaparte
24. Francesco Ruspoli, 3rd Prince of Cerveteri
12. Alessandro Ruspoli, 4th Prince of Cerveteri
25. Countess Leopoldina von Khevenhüller-Metsch
6. Giovanni Nepomucene Ruspoli, 5th Prince of Cerveteri
26. János, Count Esterházy de Galántha
13. Countess Mariana Esterházy de Galántha
27. Countess Agnes Banffy de Losonc
3. Donna Maria Cristina dei Principi Ruspoli
28. Francesco Camillo Massimo, 5th Marquess of Roccasecca
14. Camillo Massimo, 1st Prince of Arsoli
29. Donna Barbara Savelli Palombara dei Marchesi di Pietraforte
7. Donna Barbara dei Principi Massimo
30. Prince Francis Xavier of Saxony
15. Countess Maria Christina von der Lausitz
31. Countess Maria Chiara Spinucci
