= Julie Bonaparte =

Julie Bonaparte may refer to:

- Julie Clary (1771–1845), wife of Joseph Bonaparte, Queen Consort of Spain and Naples
- Zénaïde Bonaparte (1801–1854), her daughter
