= House of Bonaparte =

French imperial dynasty

House of Bonaparte House of Buonaparte
- French imperial family
- Arms of the House of Bonaparte
- Country: First and Second French Empire; Kingdom of Italy; Kingdom of Spain; Kingdom of Holland; Kingdom of Naples; Kingdom of Westphalia; Principality of Elba; Principality of Andorra; Grand Duchy of Berg; Principality of Lucca and Piombino
- Origin: Florence, Tuscany, Italy
- Founded: 13th Century
- Founder: Gianfaldo Buonaparte
- Current head: Charles, Prince Napoléon (Disputed); Jean-Christophe, Prince Napoléon (Disputed)
- Final ruler: Napoleon III
- Titles: Emperor of the French (1804–1814; 1815; 1852–1870); King of Italy (1805–1814); King of Spain (1808–1813); King of Holland (1806–1810); King of Naples and Sicily (1806–1808); King of Westphalia (1807–1813); Prince-President of France (1848–1852); First Consul of France (1799–1804); Prince of Elba (1814–1815); Co-Prince of Andorra (1806–1814; 1815; 1852–1870); Grand Duke of Berg and Cleves (1809–1813); Prince of Lucca and Piombino (1804–1814); Prince of Canino and Musignano; Prince of Montfort; Duke of Guastalla; Count of Meudon; Count of Moncalieri; Prince of Parma; Noble Patrician of Tuscany; Duke of Reichstadt; King of Rome; Count of Saint-Leu; Countess of Lipona; Grand Constable of France; Protector of the Confederation of the Rhine
- Styles: Imperial Majesty (France); Majesty (other Crowns)
- Deposition: France: 1814 (1st); 1815 (2nd); 1870 (3rd); Italy: 1814; Spain: 1813; Westphalia: 1813; Elba: 1815
- Cadet branches: Bonaparte-Canino-Musignano (extinct); Bonaparte-Murat (enatic, extant)

The House of Bonaparte (originally Buonaparte) (Note: French: Maison Bonaparte Italian and Corsican: Casa di Buonaparte) is a former European imperial and royal dynasty of Italian origin, that was recognized as noble in France under the Ancien Régime. Although the family traces its lineage to the 13th century, the imperial dynasty was established in 1804 by Napoleon I, who was the son of the French Corsican nobleman Carlo Buonaparte and noblewoman Letizia Ramolino. Napoleon I was a French military leader who rose to power during the French Revolution and who, in 1804, transformed the French First Republic into the First French Empire, five years after his coup d'état of November 1799 (18 Brumaire). Napoleon and the Grande Armée had fought against every major European power (except for the ones he was allied with, such as Denmark-Norway) and dominated much of continental Europe through a series of military victories during the Napoleonic Wars. He installed members of his own family on the thrones of client states, expanding the power of the dynasty.

The House of Bonaparte formed the Imperial House of France during the First French Empire, together with some non-Bonaparte family members. In addition to holding the title of Emperor of the French, the Bonaparte dynasty held various other titles and territories during the Napoleonic Wars, including of the Kingdom of Italy, the Kingdom of Spain, the Kingdom of Westphalia, the Kingdom of Holland, and the Kingdom of Naples. The dynasty held power for around a decade until the Napoleonic Wars began to take their toll. Making very powerful enemies, such as Austria, Britain, Russia, and Prussia, as well as royalist (particularly Bourbon) restorational movements in France, Spain, the Two Sicilies, and Sardinia, the dynasty eventually collapsed due to the final defeat of Napoleon I at the Battle of Waterloo and the restoration of the Bourbon dynasty by the Congress of Vienna.

During the reign of Napoleon I, the Imperial Family consisted of the Emperor's immediate relations – his wife, son, siblings, and some other close relatives, namely his brother-in-law Joachim Murat, his uncle Joseph Fesch, and his stepson Eugène de Beauharnais.

Between 1852 and 1870, there was a Second French Empire, when a member of the Bonaparte dynasty once again ruled France: Napoleon III, the youngest son of Louis Bonaparte. However, during the Franco-Prussian War of 1870–1871, the dynasty was again ousted from the Imperial Throne. Since that time, there has been a series of pretenders. Supporters of the Bonaparte family's claim to the throne of France are known as Bonapartists. Current head of the dynasty, Jean-Christophe, Prince Napoléon has maternal Bourbon roots, alongside his paternal Bonaparte roots.

== Origins ==
The Bonaparte (originally Italian: Buonaparte) family were patricians in the Italian towns of Sarzana, San Miniato, and Florence. The name derives from Italian: buona ("good") and parte ("part" or "side"). In Italian, the phrase "buona parte" is used to identify a fraction of considerable, but undefined, size in a totum.

Gianfaldo Buonaparte was the first known Buonaparte at Sarzana around 1200. His descendant Giovanni Buonaparte in 1397 married Isabella Calandrini, a cousin of later cardinal Filippo Calandrini. Giovanni became mayor of Sarzana and was named commissioner of the Lunigiana by Giovanni Maria Visconti in 1408. His daughter, Agnella Berni, was the great-grandmother of Italian poet Francesco Berni and their great-grandson Francesco Buonaparte was an equestrian mercenary at the service of the Genoese Bank of Saint George. In 1490, Francesco Buonaparte went to the island of Corsica, which was controlled by the bank. In 1493, he married the daughter of Guido da Castelletto, representative of the Bank of Saint George in Ajaccio, Corsica. Most of their descendants during subsequent generations were members of the Ajaccio town council. Napoleon's father, Carlo Buonaparte, received a patent of nobility from the King of France in 1771.

There also existed a Buonaparte family in Florence; however, its relationship with the Sarzana and San Miniato families is unknown. Jacopo Buonaparte of San Miniato was a friend and advisor to Medici Pope Clement VII. Jacopo was also a witness to and wrote an account of the sack of Rome, which is one of the most important historical documents recounting that event. Two of Jacopo's nephews, Pier Antonio Buonaparte and Giovanni Buonaparte, however, took part in the 1527 Medici rebellion, after which they were banished from Florence and later were restored by Alessandro de' Medici, Duke of Florence. Jacopo's brother Benedetto Buonaparte maintained political neutrality. The San Miniato branch extinguished with Jacopo in 1550. The last member of the Florence family was a canon named Gregorio Bonaparte, who died in 1803, leaving Napoleon as heir.

A Buonaparte tomb lies in the Church of San Francesco in San Miniato. A second tomb, the Ajaccio Chapelle Impériale, was built by Napoleon III in 1857.

Coat of arms of the Buonaparte of Sarzana

Coat of arms of the Buonaparte of San Miniato

Coat of arms of the Buonaparte of Florence

== Imperial House of France ==
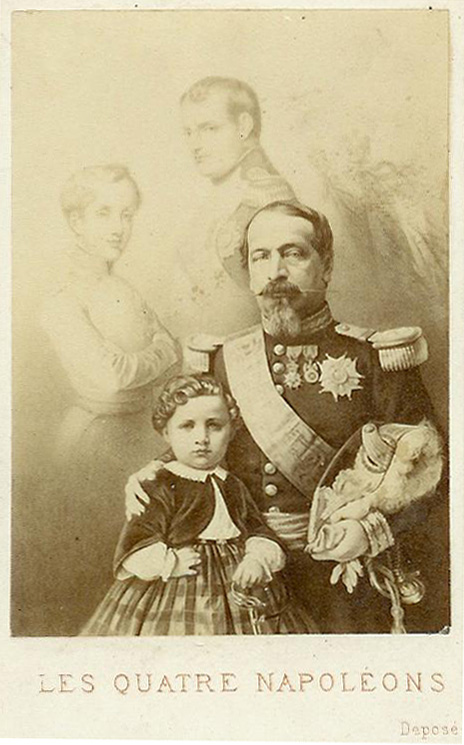
"The Four Napoleons", a 1858 propaganda image depicting Napoleon I, Napoleon II, Napoleon III, and Louis-Napoléon

In 1793, Corsica formally seceded from France and sought protection from the French, by the British government, which prompted statesman Pasquale Paoli to compel the Bonapartes to relocate at the French mainland. Napoleon I is the most prominent name associated with the Bonaparte family because he conquered much of Europe, spreading revolutionary ideas in the process, during the early 19th century. Due to his indisputable popularity in France both among the people and in the army, he staged the Coup of 18 Brumaire and overthrew the Directory with the help of his brother Lucien Bonaparte, president of the Council of Five Hundred. Napoleon then oversaw the creation of a new Constitution that made him the First Consul of France on 10 November 1799. On 2 December 1804, he crowned himself Emperor of the French and ruled from 1804 to 1814, and again in 1815 during the Hundred Days after his return from Elba.

Following his conquest of most of Western Europe, Napoleon I made his elder brother Joseph first King of Naples and then of Spain, his younger brother Louis King of Holland (subsequently forcing his abdication in 1810 after his failure to subordinate Dutch interests to those of France), and his youngest brother Jérôme as King of Westphalia, a short-lived realm created from several states of northwestern Germany.

Napoleon's son Napoléon François Charles Joseph was made King of Rome and was later styled as Napoleon II by loyalists of the dynasty, though he only ruled for two weeks after his father's abdication.

Louis-Napoléon, son of Louis, was President of France and then Emperor of the French from 1852 to 1870, reigning as Napoleon III. His son, Napoléon, Prince Imperial, died fighting the Zulus in Natal, today the South African province of KwaZulu-Natal. With his death, the family lost much of its remaining political appeal, though claimants continue to assert their right to the imperial title. A political movement for Corsican independence surfaced in the 1990s which included a Bonapartist restoration in its programme.

== Crowns held by the family ==
=== Emperors of the French ===
- Napoleon I (1804–1814, 1815), also King of Italy (1805–1814) and Emperor in Elba (1814–1815) and Co-Prince of Andorra (1804–1814, 1815)
- Napoleon II (1815), styled as King of Rome from birth, but never reigned and also Duke of Reichstadt 1818–1832, but never visited the town
- Napoleon III (1852–1870), also Co-Prince of Andorra (1852–1870)

=== Kings of Holland ===
- Louis I (1806–1810)
- Louis II (1810), also Grand Duke of Berg (1809–1813)

=== King of Naples ===
- Joseph I (1806–1808)

=== King of Westphalia ===
- Jérôme Napoleon I (1807–1813)

=== King of Spain ===
- Joseph I (1808–1813)

=== Grand Duchess of Tuscany ===
- Elisa Bonaparte (1809–1814), also Princess of Lucca and Piombino (1805–1814)

=== Princess and Duchess of Guastalla ===
- Pauline Bonaparte (1806)

== Heads of the House of Bonaparte (since 1852) ==
- Napoléon III (1852–1873)
- Napoléon IV Eugène (1873–1879), son of Napoléon III
- Napoléon V Victor (1879–1926), grandson of Napoléon I's youngest brother, Jérôme
- Napoléon VI Louis (1926–1997), son of Napoléon V Victor
- Disputed since 1997:
  - Napoléon VII Charles (1997–present), son of Napoléon VI Louis
  - Napoléon VIII Jean-Christophe (1997–present), grandson of Napoléon VI Louis

== Family tree ==
=== Family tree list ===
Note: Bold for common names

- Carlo-Maria (Ajaccio, 1746–Montpellier, 1785) married Maria Letizia Ramolino (Ajaccio, 1750–Rome, 1836) in 1764. He was a minor official in the local courts. They had eight children.
  - Joseph-Napoléon Bonaparte (Corte, 1768–Florence, 1844), King of Naples, then King of Spain, married Julie Clary (Note: Julie was sister of Napoleon's childhood sweetheart, Désirée, who was to become the wife of General Jean-Baptiste Bernadotte (later Charles XIV, King of Sweden).)
    - Julie Joséphine Bonaparte (1796–1796)
    - Zénaïde Laetitia Julie Bonaparte (1801–1854)
    - Charlotte Napoléone Bonaparte (1802–1839)
  - Napoléon (I) Bonaparte (1769–1821) Emperor of the French: Married (i) Joséphine de Beauharnais; no issue. Adopted Eugène and Hortense de Beauharnais. Married (ii) Marie Louise of Austria;
    - Napoléon (II) François Joseph Charles Bonaparte (1811–1832), Prince Imperial, King of Rome, Prince of Parma, son of Archduchess Marie Louise of Austria (of the Habsburg dynasty), Empress consort, then Duchess of Parma
  - Lucien Bonaparte (1775–1840) Roman Prince of Canino and Musignano
    3 daughters with first wife, Christine Boyer:
    - Charlotte Philistine Bonaparte (1795–1865), married Prince Mario Gabrielli
    - Victoire Gertrude Bonaparte (1797–1797)
    - Christine Charlotte Alexandrine Egypta Bonaparte (1798–1847), married Count Arvid Posse, then married Lord Dudley Stuart
    10 children with second wife, Alexandrine de Bleschamp:
    - Charles Lucien Jules Laurent Bonaparte (1803–1857), ornithologist and politician, married Princess Zénaïde Bonaparte (1801–1854)
      - Joseph Lucien Charles Napoléon Bonaparte (1824–1865)
      - Alexandrine Gertrude Zénaïde Bonaparte (1826–1828)
      - Lucien Louis Joseph Napoléon (Cardinal) Bonaparte (1828–1895)
      - Julie Charlotte Pauline Zénaïde Laetitia Désirée Bartholomée Bonaparte (1830–1900)
      - Charlotte Honorine Joséphine Pauline Bonaparte (1832–1901)
      - Léonie Stéphanie Elise Bonaparte (1833–1839)
      - Marie Désirée Eugénie Joséphine Philomène Bonaparte (1835–1890)
      - Augusta Amélie Maximilienne Jacqueline Bonaparte (1836–1900)
      - Napoléon Charles Grégoire Jacques Philippe Bonaparte (1839–1899)
        - Zénaïde Victoire Eugénie Bonaparte (1860–1862)
        - Marie Léonie Eugénie Mathilde Jeanne Julie Zénaïde Bonaparte (1870–1947)
        - Eugénie Laetitia Barbe Caroline Lucienne Marie Jeanne Bonaparte (1872–1949)
        - Bathilde Aloïse Léonie Bonaparte (1840–1861)
        - Albertine Marie Thérèse Bonaparte (1842–1842)
        - Charles Albert Edmond Bonaparte (1843–1847)
    - Laetitia Christine Bonaparte (1804–1871)
    - Joseph Lucien Bonaparte (1806–1807)
    - Jeanne Adélaïde Bonaparte (1807–1829)
    - Paul Marie Bonaparte (1808–1827)
    - Louis Lucien Bonaparte (1813–1891)
    - Pierre Napoléon Bonaparte (1815–1881), married Éléonore-Justine Ruflin
      - Roland Bonaparte (1858–1924), married Marie-Félix Blanc
        - Princess Marie Bonaparte (1882–1962), married Prince George of Greece
      - Princess Jeanne Bonaparte (1861–1910)
    - Antoine Lucien Bonaparte (1816–1877)
    - Alexandrine Marie Bonaparte (1818–1874)
    - Constance Marie Bonaparte (1823–1876)
  - Maria-Anna Elisa Bonaparte (1777–1820), Grand-Duchess of Tuscany, married Felice Baciocchi, Prince of Lucca
    - Marie-Laetitia Bonaparte Baciocchi
  - Louis-Napoléon Bonaparte (1778–1846), King of Holland, married Hortense de Beauharnais, Napoleon's stepdaughter
    - Napoléon Charles Bonaparte (1802–1807)
    - Napoléon Louis Bonaparte (1804–1831)
    - Charles Louis Napoléon (III) Bonaparte (1808–1873) Emperor of the French, married Maria Eugenia Ignacia Augustina Palafox de Guzmán Portocarrero y Kirkpatrick
      - Napoléon Eugène Louis John Joseph Bonaparte, Prince Imperial (1856–1879)
  - Maria Paola or Marie Pauline Bonaparte (1780–1825) Princess and Duchess of Guastalla, married in 1797 to French General Charles Leclerc and later married Camillo Borghese, 6th Prince of Sulmona.
  - Maria Annunziata Caroline Bonaparte (1782–1839) married Joachim Murat, Marshal of the Empire, Grand Duke of Berg, then King of Naples
    - Prince Achille Murat (1801–1847), married Catherine Willis Gray (1803–1867), great-grandniece of George Washington
    - Prince Napoléon Lucien Charles Murat (1803–1878), married Caroline Georgina Fraser (1810–1879)
      5 Children, including:
      - Joachim Joseph Napoléon Murat, 4th Prince Murat (1834–1901), Major-General of the French Army, married firstly Malcy Louise Caroline Berthier de Wagram (1832–1884) and had issue, and secondly Lydia Hervey, without issue
      - Prince Louis Napoléon Murat (1851–1912), married in Odesa, Eudoxia Mikhailovna Somova (1850–1924), had issue now extinct in male line
  - Jérôme-Napoléon Bonaparte (1784–1860), King of Westphalia
    1 child from first marriage, to Elizabeth Patterson of Baltimore:
    - Jérôme Napoléon Bonaparte (1805–1870), married Susan May Williams and had 2 sons:
      - Jerome Napoleon Bonaparte II (1830–1893), married Caroline Le Roy Appleton Edgar
        - Louise-Eugénie Bonaparte (1873–1923), married in 1896 Count Adam Carl von Moltke-Huitfeld (1864–1944); had issue
        - Jerome Napoléon Charles Bonaparte (1878–1945), married Blanche Pierce Stenbeigh, no issue
      - Charles Joseph Bonaparte (1851–1921), United States Secretary of the Navy and United States Attorney General, married Ellen Channing Day, no issue
    3 children from second marriage, to Princess Catharina of Württemberg:
    - Jérôme Napoléon Charles Bonaparte (1814–1847), unmarried and childless
    - Mathilde Laetitia Wilhelmine Bonaparte (1820–1904), married Anatoly Nikolaievich Demidov, 1st Prince of San Donato: no issue
    - Napoléon Joseph Charles Paul Bonaparte, Prince Napoléon (1822–1891), called Plon-Plon, married Princess Marie Clothilde of Savoy daughter of Victor Emmanuel II of Italy
      - Napoléon Victor Jérôme Frédéric Bonaparte, Prince Napoléon (1862–1926), married Princess Clémentine of Belgium
        - Marie Clotilde Eugénie Alberte Laetitia Geneviève Bonaparte (1912–1996), married Count Serge de Witt
        - Louis Jérôme Victor Emmanuel Léopold Marie Bonaparte, Prince Napoléon (1914–1997), married Alix de Foresta
          - Charles Marie Jérôme Victor Bonaparte, Prince Napoléon (born 1950)
            Two children from first marriage, to Princess Béatrice of Bourbon-Two Sicilies:
            - Caroline Marie Constance Bonaparte (Princess Caroline Napoléon) (born 1980)
            - Jean-Christophe Louis Ferdinand Albéric Bonaparte, Prince Napoléon (born 1986), married Countess Olympia von und zu Arco-Zinneberg
              - Louis Charles Riprand Victor Jérôme Marie Napoléon (born 2022)
              - Ferdinand Napoléon (born 2026)
            1 child and 1 adopted child from second marriage, to Jeanne-Françoise Valliccioni:
            - Sophie Catherine Bonaparte (born 1992)
            - Anh Laëtitia Bonaparte (born 1998, adopted)
          - Catherine Elisabeth Albérique Marie Bonaparte (born 1950)
          - Laure Clémentine Geneviève Bonaparte (born 1952)
          - Jérôme Xavier Marie Joseph Victor Bonaparte (Prince Jérôme Napoléon) (born 1957), married in 2013 with Licia Innocenti
      - Napoléon Louis Joseph Jérôme Bonaparte (1864–1932) Russian general, unmarried and childless
      - Marie Laetitia Eugénie Catherine Adélaïde Bonaparte (1866–1926), married Prince Amedeo of Savoy, Duke of Aosta

=== Family tree of Bonaparte ===
Carlo Buonaparte; 1746–1785	Letizia Ramolino; 1750–1836
3	4	1	2	5	6	7	8
Lucien Bonaparte; 1775–1840 m.2 Alexandrine de Bleschamp	Elisa Bonaparte; 1777–1820 m. Félix Baciocchi	Joseph Bonaparte; 1768–1844 m. Julie Clary	Marie Louise of Austria; 1791–1847	Napoléon I 1769–1821	Joséphine de Beauharnais; 1763–1814	Alexandre de Beauharnais; 1760–1794	Pauline Bonaparte; 1780–1825 m.1 Charles Leclerc m.2 Camillo Borghese	Caroline Bonaparte; 1782–1839 m. Joachim Murat	Catharina of Württemberg; 1783–1835	Jérôme Bonaparte; 1784–1860	Betsy Patterson; 1785–1879
4 children	Napoléon II; 1811–1832	Eugène de Beauharnais; 1781–1824 m. Augusta of Bavaria	Hortense de Beauharnais; 1783–1837	Louis Bonaparte; 1778–1846	Achille Murat; 1801–1847 m. Catherine Willis Gray	Jérôme Napoléon Charles Bonaparte; 1814–1847	Mathilde Bonaparte; 1820–1904 m. Anatoly Demidov, Prince of San Donato	Prince Napoléon-Jérôme Bonaparte; 1822–1891 m. Maria Clotilde of Savoy	Jérôme Napoléon Bonaparte; 1805–1870 m. Susan May Williams
Charles Lucien Bonaparte; 1803–1857	Zénaïde Bonaparte; 1801–1854	Julie Joséphine Bonaparte; 1796	Charlotte Bonaparte; 1802–1839	Napoléon Louis Bonaparte; 1804–1831	Napoléon Charles Bonaparte; 1802–1807	Napoléon III; 1808–1873 m.Eugénie de Montijo	Napoléon V Victor; 1862–1926 m. Clémentine of Belgium	Napoléon Louis Joseph Jérôme Bonaparte; 1864–1932	Maria Letizia Bonaparte; 1866–1926 m. Amadeo of Savoy	Jerome Napoleon Bonaparte II; 1830–1893 m. Caroline Edgar	Charles Bonaparte; 1851–1921 m. Ellen Channing Day
Joseph Lucien Bonaparte; 1824–1865	Lucien Cardinal Bonaparte; 1828–1895	Napoléon Charles Bonaparte; 1839–1899	10 others	Napoléon IV Eugène; 1856–1879	Marie Clotilde Bonaparte; 1912–1996	Napoléon VI Louis; 1914–1997 m. Alix de Foresta
Zénaïde Bonaparte; 1860–1862	Mary Bonaparte; 1870–1947	Eugénie Bonaparte; 1872–1949	Napoléon VII Charles b. 1950	Catherine Elisabeth Bonaparte b. 1950	Laure Clémentine Bonaparte b. 1952	Jérôme Xavier Bonaparte b. 1957
Caroline Bonaparte b. 1980	Jean-Christophe Napoléon b. 1986	Sophie Catherine Bonaparte b. 1992
Louis Charles Bonaparte b. 2022

=== Male-line family tree ===
- Charles Buonaparte, 1746–1785
  - Joseph Bonaparte, King of Naples, then King of Spain, 1768–1844
  - Napoleon Bonaparte, 1769–1821, Emperor of the French
    - Napoleon II, 1811–1832, Prince Imperial, King of Rome
  - Lucien Bonaparte, 1775–1840, Prince of Canino and Musignano
    - Charles Lucien Bonaparte, 2nd Prince of Canino and Musignano, 1803–1857
      - Joseph Lucien Bonaparte, 3rd Prince of Canino and Musignano, 1824–1865
      - Lucien Bonaparte (cardinal), 4th Prince of Canino and Musignano, 1828–1895
      - Napoleon Charles Bonaparte, 5th Prince of Canino and Musignano, 1839–1899
    - Paul Mary Bonaparte, 1808–1827
    - Louis Lucien Bonaparte, 1813–1891
    - Peter Napoléon Bonaparte, 1815–1881
      - Roland Bonaparte, 1858–1924
    - Anthony Lucien Bonaparte, 1816–1877
  - Louis Bonaparte, 1778–1846, King of Holland
    - Napoléon Louis Bonaparte, 1804–1831
    - Napoleon III, 1808–1873, Emperor of the French
      - Louis-Napoléon, Prince Imperial, 1856–1879
  - Jérôme Bonaparte, 1784–1860, King of Westphalia
    - Jérôme Napoléon Bonaparte, 1805–1870
      - Jerome Napoleon Bonaparte II, 1830–1893
        - Jerome Napoléon Charles Bonaparte III, 1878–1945
        - Charles Joseph Bonaparte, 1851–1921
    - Jérôme Napoléon Charles Bonaparte I, 1814–1847
    - Prince Napoléon-Jérôme Bonaparte, 1822–1891
      - Victor, Prince Napoléon, 1862–1926
        - Louis, Prince Napoléon, 1914–1997
          - Charles, Prince Napoléon, b. 1950
            - Jean-Christophe, Prince Napoléon, b. 1986
              - Prince Louis Napoléon, b. 2022
              - Prince Ferdinand Napoléon, b. 2026
          - Jérôme Xavier, b. 1957
      - Louis Bonaparte, 1864–1932

== Bonaparte coat of arms ==
The arms of the Bonaparte family were: Gules two bends sinister between two mullets or. In 1804, Napoleon I changed the arms to Azure an imperial eagle or. The change applied to all members of his family except for his brother Lucien and his nephew, the son from Jérôme's first marriage.

Arms of Charles-Maria Buonaparte

Arms of Lucien Bonaparte, Prince of Canino and Musignano

Arms of Napoleon I and Napoleon II, as Emperor of the French

Arms of Napoleon I and Napoleon II, as Kings of Italy

Arms of Napoleon I, as Sovereign of Elba

Arms of Joseph Bonaparte, as King of Naples

Arms of Joseph Bonaparte, as King of Spain

Arms of Louis I and Louis II, as King of Holland

Arms of Napoléon-Louis Bonaparte (Louis II), as Grand Duke of Berg

Arms of Jérôme Bonaparte, as King of Westphalia

Arms of Napoleon III, as Emperor of the French

Arms of Lucien Louis Joseph Napoléon Bonaparte, as Cardinal

== DNA research ==
According to studies by G. Lucotte and his coauthors based on DNA research since 2011, Napoleon Bonaparte belonged to Y-DNA (direct male ancestry) haplogroup E1b1b1c1* (E-M34*). This 15000-year-old haplogroup has its highest concentration in Ethiopia and in the Near East (Jordan, Yemen). According to the authors of the study, "Probably Napoléon also knew his remote oriental patrilineal origins, because Francesco Buonaparte (the Giovanni son), who was a mercenary under the orders of the Genoa Republic in Ajaccio in 1490, was nicknamed The Maure of Sarzane." The latest study identifies the common Bonaparte DNA markers from Carlo (Charles) Bonaparte to 3 living descendants.

Lucotte et al. published in October 2013 the extended Y-STR of Napoleon I based on descendant testing, and the descendants were E-M34, just like the emperor's beard hair tested a year before. The persons tested were the patrilineal descendants of Jérome Bonaparte, one of Napoleon's brothers, and of Alexandre Colonna-Walewski, Napoleon's illegitimate son with Marie Walewska. These three tests all yielded the same Y-STR haplotype (109 markers) confirming with 100% certainty that the first Emperor of the French belonged to the M34 branch of haplogroup E1b1b.

STR strongly suggests that the Bonaparte belong to the Y58897 branch, which means that the ancestor 3000 years ago or a bit more lived in Anatolia, but all relatives in the database with a common ancestor with over 1000 years are found in their own the Massa - La Spezia small area in Italy. There are at the moment no relatives in the database older than that, which means they are very rare in Europe.

== Living members ==
Charles, Prince Napoléon (born 1950, great-great-grandson of Jérôme Bonaparte by his second marriage), and his son Jean-Christophe, Prince Napoléon (born 1986 and appointed heir in the will of his grandfather Louis, Prince Napoléon)currently dispute the headship of the Bonaparte family. The only other male members of the family are Charles's brother, Prince Jérôme Napoléon (born 1957) and Jean-Christophe's son, Prince Louis Napoléon (born 2022). There are no other legitimate descendants in the male line from Napoleon I or from his brothers.

There are, however, numerous descendants of Napoleon's illegitimate, unacknowledged son, Count Alexandre Colonna-Walewski (1810–1868), born from Napoleon I's union with Marie, Countess Walewski. A descendant of Napoleon's sister Caroline Bonaparte was actor René Auberjonois. Recent DNA-matches with living descendants of Jérôme and Count Walewski have confirmed the existence of descendants of Lucien Bonaparte, Napoleon's brother, namely the Clovis family.

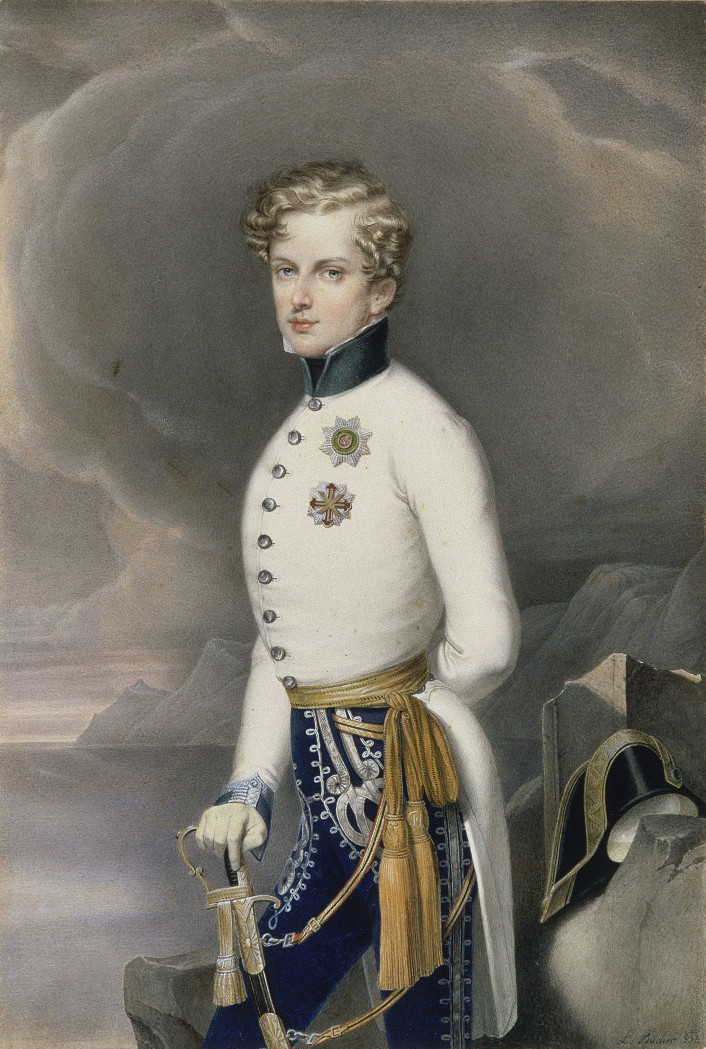
Napoleon II - Napoleon I's only legitimate child

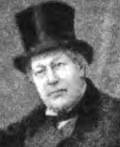
Charles, Count Léon (1806–1881), son of Napoleon I

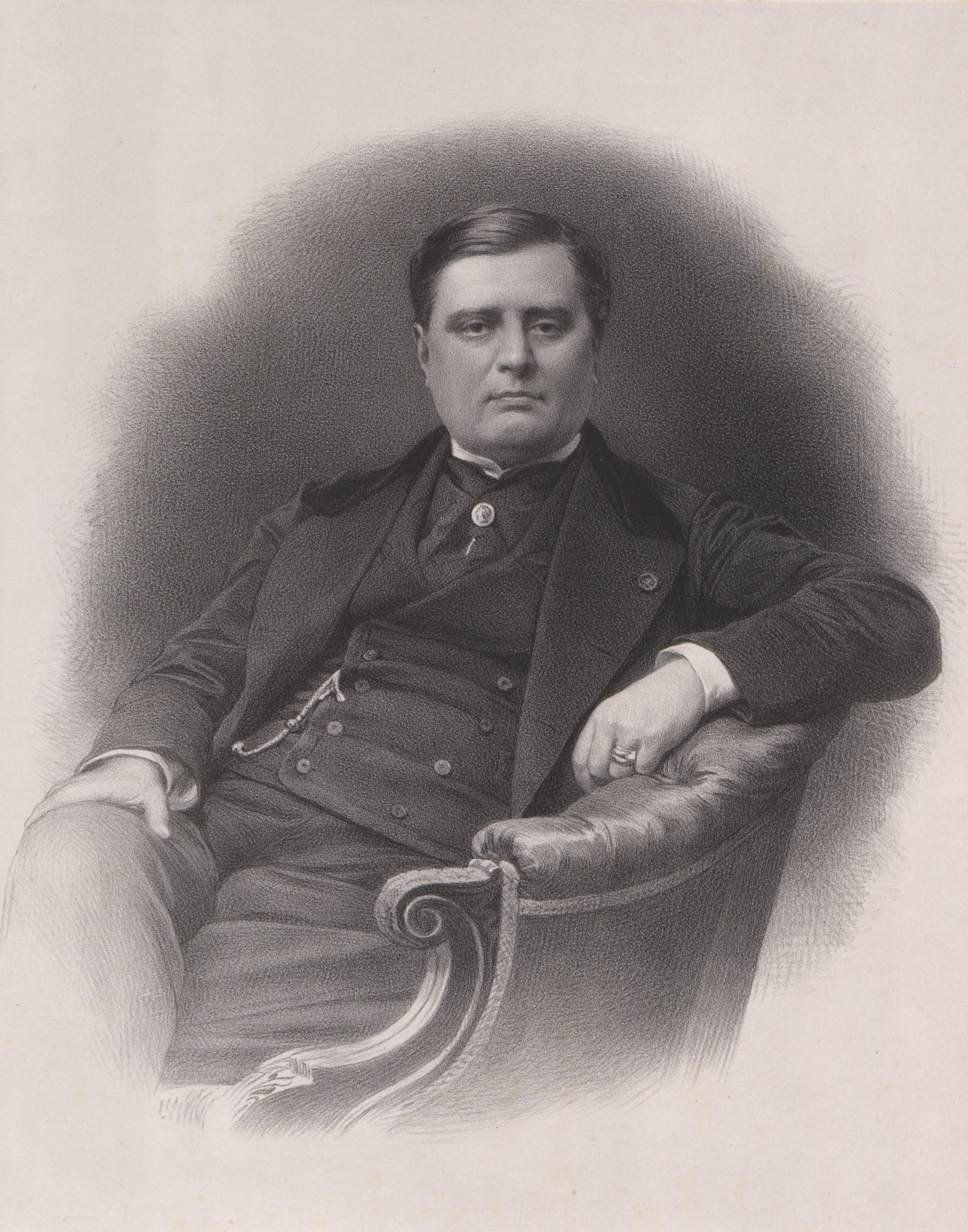
Count Alexandre Colonna-Walewski, Napoleon I's unacknowledged son

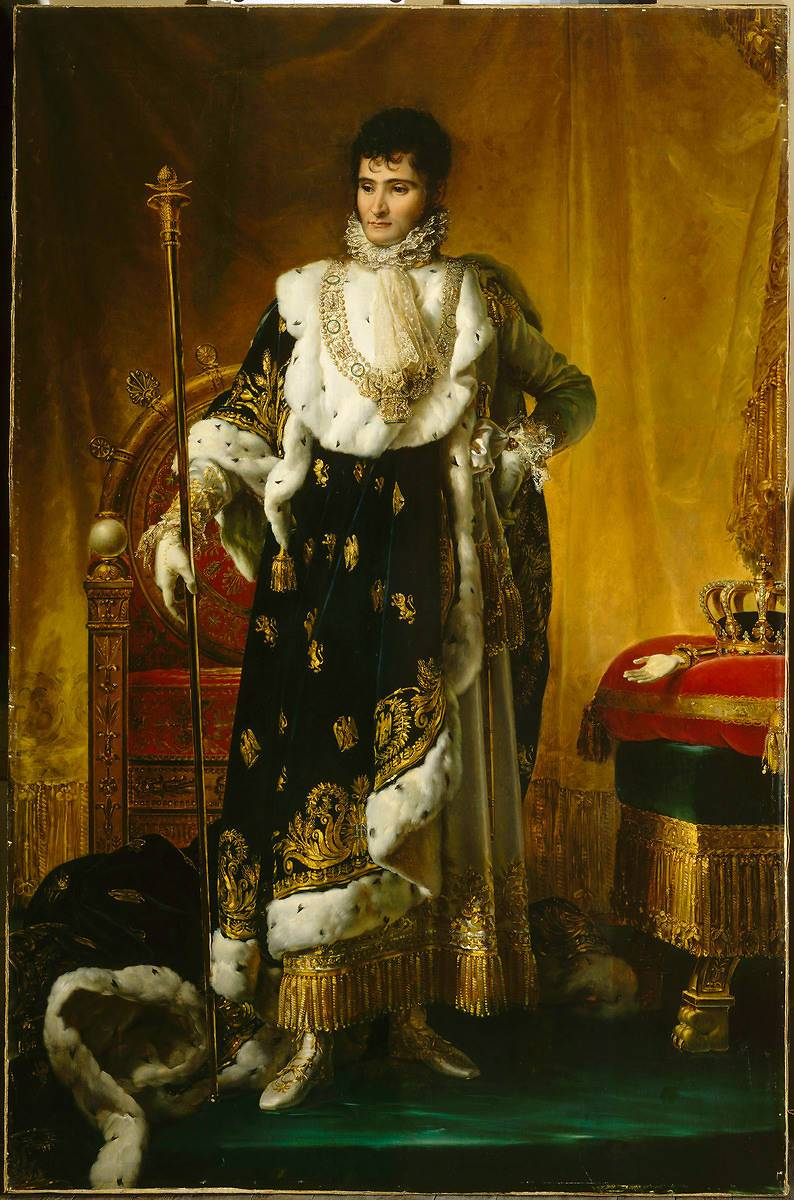
Jérôme Bonaparte, founder of the surviving legitimate Bonapartist line of succession

== See also ==
- Bonapartism
- Bonapartists (political party)
- Succession to the former French throne (Bonapartist)

== Footnotes ==
*Royal House* House of Bonaparte
Vacant Title last held by House of Bourbon as King of France	Ruling House of the French Empire; 1804–1814	Succeeded by House of Bourbon as King of France
Vacant Title last held by House of Orléans as King of the French	Ruling House of the French Empire; 1852–1870	Empire Abolished; Third French Republic Declared
Preceded by House of Habsburg as Nominal King of Italy	Ruling House of the Kingdom of Italy; 1805–1814	Succeeded by House of Habsburg as King of Lombardy–Venetia
Preceded by House of Bourbon as Kings of Spain and Naples	Ruling House of the Kingdom of Naples; 1806–1808	Succeeded by House of Murat; Reverted to Spanish Bourbons in 1815
Preceded by House of Bourbon as Kings of Spain and Naples	Ruling House of the Kingdom of Spain; 1808–1813	Succeeded by House of Bourbon
Preceded by New Creation; Succeeded the Batavian Republic	Ruling House of the Kingdom of Holland; 1806–1810	Kingdom Abolished; Part of the French Empire; Kingdom of the Netherlands created in 1815
Preceded by New Creation; Formed from the territories ceded by Prussia in Peace of Tilsit	Ruling House of the Kingdom of Westphalia; 1807–1813	Kingdom Abolished; Dissolved after Battle of Leipzig; Status quo of 1806 restored
