= Beatrix of Bourbon =

Beatrix or Beatrice of Bourbon may refer to:

- Beatrix of Burgundy, Dame de Bourbon (1257–1310)
- Beatrice of Bourbon (1320–1383)
- Infanta Beatriz of Spain (Beatriz de Borbón y Battenberg; 1909–2002)
- Princess Béatrice of Bourbon-Two Sicilies (born 1950)
