= Line of succession to the French throne =

Line of succession to the French throne may refer to:

- Line of succession to the French throne (Bonapartist)
- Line of succession to the French throne (Orléanist)
