= Napoléon Charles Bonaparte, 5th Prince of Canino =

Napoléon Charles Bonaparte
- Prince of Canino and Musignano
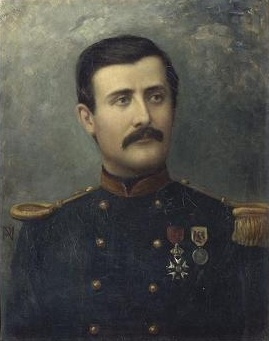
- Born: 5 February 1839; Rome, Papal States (now Italy)
- Died: 11 February 1899 (aged 60); Rome, Italy
- Burial: Imperial Chapel, Ajaccio, France
- Spouse: Maria Cristina Ruspoli (m. 1859)
- Issue: Princess Zénaïde Bonaparte; Princess Mary, Mrs. Enrico Gotti; Eugénie, Princess de La Moskowa
Names
- Napoléon Charles Grégoire Jacques Philippe Bonaparte
- House: Bonaparte
- Father: Charles Lucien Bonaparte
- Mother: Zénaïde Bonaparte

Napoléon Charles Bonaparte, 5th Prince of Canino and Musignano (Napoléon Charles Grégoire Jacques Philippe Bonaparte; 5 February 1839 – 11 February 1899), was born in Rome as the son of Charles Lucien Bonaparte and his wife, Zénaïde Bonaparte.

== Life and career ==
Napoléon Charles served in the French Army and saw action during the French intervention in Mexico and the Franco-Prussian War, the latter of which resulted in the downfall of the Second French Empire of his cousin, Emperor Napoléon III.

He was married in Rome on 25 November 1859, to Maria Cristina Ruspoli (1842–1907), daughter of Giovanni Nepomucene Ruspoli, 5th Prince of Cerveteri, and they had three daughters:

- Princess Zénaïde Eugénie Bonaparte (1860–1862)
- Princess Mary Bonaparte (1870–1947); married Enrico Gotti.
- Princess Eugénie Bonaparte (1872–1949); married and later divorced Léon Napoléon Ney, 4th prince de La Moskowa.

Napoléon Charles succeeded as 5th Prince of Canino and Musignano on 19 November 1895, following the death of his brother Lucien. His cousin, Prince Roland Bonaparte, succeeded him as the 6th Prince of Canino and Musignano but did not assume the title.

== Ancestry ==
Ancestors of Napoléon Charles Bonaparte, 5th Prince of Canino

8. Carlo Buonaparte
4. Lucien Bonaparte, 1st Prince of Canino and Musignano
9. Letizia Ramolino
2. Charles Lucien Bonaparte, 2nd Prince of Canino and Musignano
10. Charles Jacob de Bleschamp
5. Alexandrine de Bleschamp
11. Philiberte Bouvet
1. Napoléon Charles Bonaparte, 5th Prince of Canino and Musignano
12. Carlo Buonaparte (=8)
6. Joseph Bonaparte, King of Spain
13. Letizia Ramolino (=9)
3. Princess Zénaïde Bonaparte
14. François Clary
7. Julie Clary
15. Françoise Rose Somis

Napoléon Charles Bonaparte, 5th Prince of Canino House of Bonaparte Born: 5 February 1839 Died: 11 February 1899
Titles of nobility
Preceded by Lucien	Prince of Canino and Musignano; 1895–1899	Succeeded by Roland
