= Enrico Gotti =

Italian general

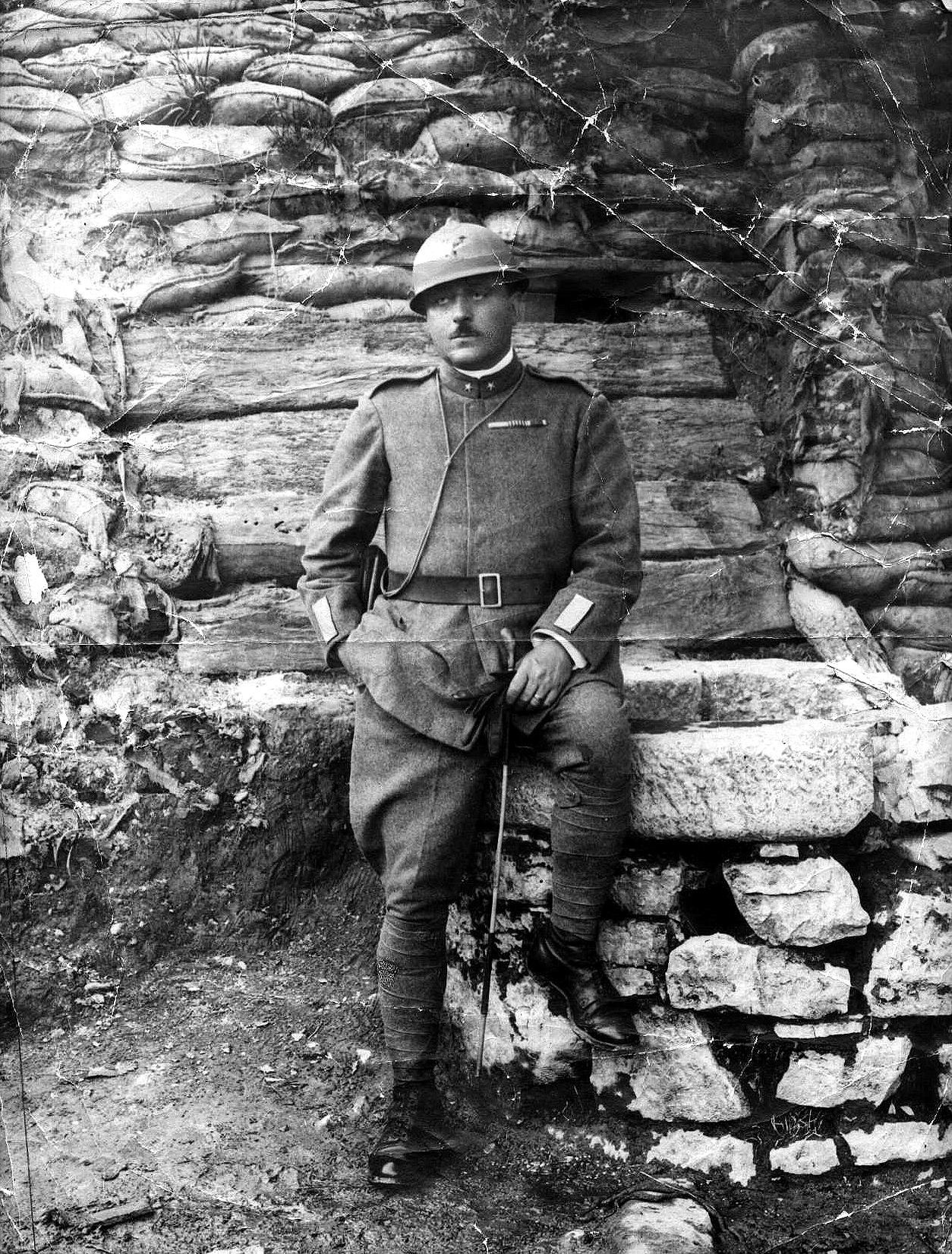
- Born: 18 July 1867; Turin, Kingdom of Italy
- Died: 6 June 1920 (aged 52); Vlora, Albania
- Relatives: Mary Bonaparte (spouse)
- Military career
- Allegiance: Kingdom of Italy
- Branch: Royal Italian Army
- Rank: General
- Conflicts: Vlora War †

Enrico Gotti (18 July 1867 - 6 June 1920) was an Italian General in the service of the Italian Army and the commander of the Italian forces in the Italian held Vlora in 1920. He died during the Battle of Vlora in Albania, killed in action.

He was awarded the Gold Medal of Military Valor (Medaglia d'oro al valor militare, MVOM).

Gotti was born in Turin in 1867. In 1891 he had married Mary Bonaparte, who was the eldest daughter of Prince Napoléon Bonaparte of Canino and Christine Ruspoli. They had no children.
