= Jacopo Buonaparte =

Coat of arms of the Buonapartes from San Miniato

Jacopo Buonaparte was an early member of the Bonaparte family (of the branch from San Miniato, as opposed to the branch known at Sarzana since c. 1200 from which Napoleon derives) and a friend and advisor to Medici Pope Clement VII. He is notable for being a non-Roman eyewitness to the sack of Rome on May 6, 1527 where the pope was forced to surrender the Castel Sant' Angelo and pay a ransom for his life. Jacopo's record is one of the most important surviving historical documents of that time.

Prior to this, Pope Clement the VII was Cardinal Giulio de' Medici and the connection between the Buonaparte and Medici family can be traced back to Florence, Italy. The Buonapartes lived in San Miniato just outside Florence, and the Medici family under Cosimo il Vecchio ruled until the 16th century. Jacopo, as stated, was a friend and advisor to one of the most powerful Medicis, the pope, and his brother Benedetto Buonaparte was politically neutral. The relationship between the families was severely strained after two of Jacopo's nephews Pier-Antonio Buonaparte and Giovanni Buonaparte joined the 1527 rebellion against the Medici rule.

Jacopo himself was present at the sack of Rome, recorded the attack, and was saved from death because he was sheltered in the Castel Sant' Angelo with Pope Clement and his forces. After the attack and surrender, Pope Clement allied himself with the German Imperial Army, sacked Florence and banished Pier-Antonio and Giovanni, who were later restored by Alessandro de' Medici.

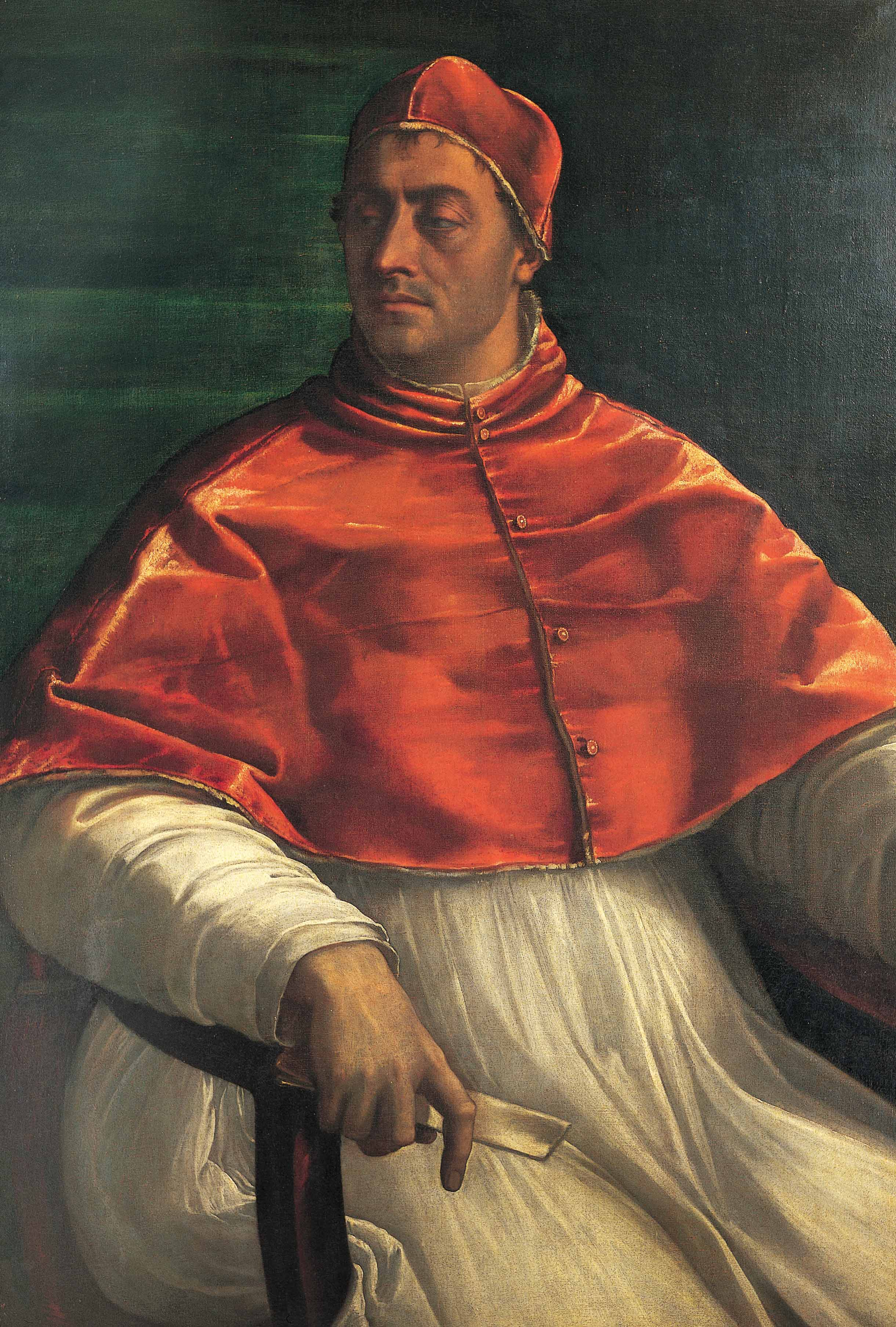
Pope Clement VII

By this time San Miniato had been annexed by Florence when Michelangelo finished building his wall around the city. The Buonaparte tomb lies in the Cathedral of San Miniato.

== Link to partbooks XIX 164-7 in the Magliabechiano archive ==
Musicologist Joshua Drake suggests that Jacopo can be linked to four partbooks in the Biblioteca Nazionale Centrale Firenze that consist of 49 Italian, 24 French secular and 13 Latin sacred musical compositions from early composers such as Josquin, Heinrich Isaac, Sebastiano Festa and Bernardo Pisano. The partbooks have been essential in reconstructing the life of Pisano.

Drake discovered that emblems in the Bassus partbook bore a striking similarity to the Buonaparte family coat of arms and the time period, binding and Florentine script made it plausible that Jacopo could have been the probable owner or compiler of these partbooks.
