= Paul Marie Bonaparte =

Corsican nobleman

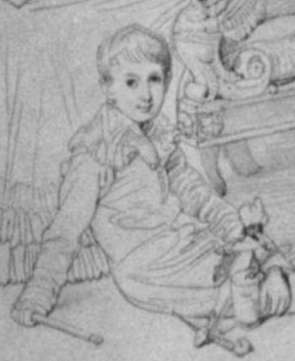

Prince Paul Marie Bonaparte (19 February 1809 in Canino – 7 September 1827 in Nafplio) was the third child of Lucien Bonaparte and Alexandrine de Bleschamp. He fought in the Greek War of Independence.

Paul Marie Bonaparte studied at the University of Bologna. In March 1827 he secretly left the city, and under an assumed name, went to Greece to take part in the Greek War of Independence. Arriving first at the Ionian Islands, Bonaparte was welcomed on 24 August at Poros by the British Admiral Cochrane, who was entrusted with command of the Greek fleet. Bonaparte served on the flagship frigate Hellas, which after a series of unsuccessful operations stood off in the strait of the island Spetses.

On 6 September 1827, on board the Hellas, Bonaparte was mortally wounded while cleaning his own gun and died the day after.

After the end of the war in 1832, Bonaparte was buried in a mausoleum on the island of Sphacteria, close to the French sailors who fell in the Battle of Navarino.

== Ancestry ==
Ancestors of Paul Marie Bonaparte

16. Sebastiano Niccolò Buonaparte
8. Giuseppe Maria Buonaparte
17. Maria Anna Tusilo di Bocognano
4. Carlo Buonaparte
18. Giuseppe Maria Paravicini
9. Maria Saveria Paravicini
19. Maria Angela Salineri
2. Lucien Bonaparte, 1st Prince of Canino and Musignano
20. Giovanni Agostino Ramolino
10. Giovanni Geronimo Ramolino
21. Angela Maria Peri
5. Letizia Ramolino
22. Giuseppe Maria Pietrasanta
11. Angela Maria Pietrasanta
23. Maria Giuseppina Malerba
1. Prince Paul Marie Bonaparte
12. Nicolas Jacob de Bleschamp
6. Charles Jacob de Bleschamp
26. Pierre Dehorgue
13. Marguerite Dehorgue
27. Jeanne Poindrette
3. Alexandrine de Bleschamp
14. Jean-Charles Bouvet
7. Philiberte Bouvet
30. Antoine François Grimod de Verneuil
15. Marie Gasparde Grimod de Verneuil
31. Marie Suzanne Papet

== Sources ==
- Dictionnaire de biographie française, tom VI, Paris 1951
