= Prince of Canino and Musignano =

Title held by the House of Bonaporte

- Parent house: House of Bonaparte
- Founded: 1814
- Founder: Lucien Bonaparte
- Titles: Prince of Canino; Prince of Musignano

The Princes of Canino and Musignano formed the genealogically senior line of the Bonaparte family following the death of Joseph Bonaparte in 1844. The line was succeeded by one of Emperor Napoleon's younger brothers, Lucien Bonaparte. It became extinct in the male line in 1924. The dynastic Bonapartist pretenders descend in the male line from Prince Jérôme Napoléon, Napoleon's youngest brother.

Canino and Musignano are two neighbouring villages in the Province of Viterbo in Italy. They were bestowed on Lucien Bonaparte by papal authority on 18 August 1814 (Prince of Canino) and on 21 March 1824 (Prince of Musignano).

== First Empire law ==
Article 7 of the monarchical constitution of the First French Empire, promulgated 20 May 1804, established that upon extinction of the legitimate natural and adopted male, agnatic descendants of Napoleon I (1769–1821), and those of two of his brothers, Prince Joseph Napoléon (1768–1844) and Prince Louis Napoléon (1778–1846), the throne was to be awarded to a man selected by the non-dynastic princely and ducal dignitaries of the empire, as ratified by plebiscite. On 24 September 1806, the emperor's youngest brother, Jérôme Napoléon (1784–1860), was made a French prince, along with the future issue of his second marriage to Duchess Catharina of Württemberg, and he and his heirs were added into the succession.

On 22 March 1815, during the Hundred Days, Napoleon also recognized his brother Lucien and Lucien's sons as Imperial French princes. At no time, however, were Lucien and his issue recognized during the First Empire as eligible by law to inherit the French throne, or any other throne. The title of Principe di Canino e Musignano borne by Lucien and his heirs male was a papal title of nobility, never legally recognized in France.

Therefore, upon the death without issue in 1832 of the Duke of Reichstadt, titular Emperor Napoleon II, the claim to the Bonaparte crown of France devolved upon Joseph Bonaparte, formerly King of Naples and then King of Spain. Following his death without sons in 1844, the Imperial claim bypassed Lucien's sons and devolved upon Louis Bonaparte, formerly King of Holland, even though Louis had been younger than Lucien.

== Second Empire law ==
Louis's two elder sons pre-deceased their father, but his third son became Emperor Napoleon III in 1852. The Second Empire's constitution recognized the dynasticity of all of Napoleon I's brothers and their issue, but allowed the emperor to choose the order in which they would inherit the throne in the event he died without male issue. On 18 December 1852 the emperor appointed his only remaining uncle, Prince Jérôme Napoléon, former King of Westphalia, as heir presumptive, again bypassing the male line of Lucien.

In May 1870, that order of succession was confirmed by referendum, except that Prince Napoléon Joseph (1822–1891), Jérôme's surviving son by his second wife, Duchess Catharina of Württemberg, was named to follow the emperor's son, the Prince Imperial Napoléon Eugène in the succession line. However, a few months later the French Empire was abolished, and has not been restored. Meanwhile, the agnatic descendants of Jérôme Napoléon's branch (the Prince Napoléon Line) are still extant, and still hold the dynastic claim to the Napoleonic legacy.

== Princes of Canino and Musignano ==
1. Lucien Bonaparte 1814–1840
2. Charles Lucien Bonaparte 1840–1857
3. Joseph Bonaparte 1857–1865
4. Lucien Cardinal Bonaparte 1865–1895
5. Napoléon Charles Bonaparte 1895–1899
6. Roland Bonaparte 1899–1924

== Family tree ==
Lucien Bonaparte (1775–1840) married twice: first to Christine Boyer, who gave birth to a stillborn son and three daughters; and second to Alexandrine de Bleschamp and had eight children.

Children from his second marriage include:

1. Charles Lucien Bonaparte (1803–1857).
  - Married Zénaïde Bonaparte; 12 children including:
  1. Joseph Lucien Bonaparte (1824–1865)
  2. Lucien Cardinal Bonaparte (1828–1895)
  3. Napoléon Charles Bonaparte (1839–1899).
    - Married Cristina Ruspoli; three daughters including:
    1. Mary Bonaparte (1870–1947). Married Enrico Gotti; no children.
    2. Eugenie Bonaparte (1872–1949). Married Napoleon Ney, duc d'Elchingen; no children.
2. Pierre Napoleon Bonaparte (1815–1881).
  - Married Justine Eléonore Ruffin; 1 son:
  1. Roland Bonaparte (1858–1924).
    - Married Marie-Félix Blanc; one daughter:
    1. Princess Marie Bonaparte (1882–1962).
      - Married Prince George of Greece and Denmark; 2 children:
      1. Prince Peter of Greece and Denmark (1908–1980). Married Irina Aleksandrovna Ovtchinnikova; no children.
      2. Princess Eugénie of Greece and Denmark (1910–1988).
        - Married first Dominik Rainer Radziwiłł; two children including:
        1. Prince George Radziwiłł (1942–2001).
        - Married second Raymundo, Duke of Castel Duino; one son:
        1. Carlo Alessandro, Duke of Castel Duino (b. 1952).
          - Married Veronique Lantz; three children including:
          1. Prince Dimitri della Torre e Tasso (b. 1977)
