= Lucien Bonaparte (cardinal) =

French cardinal

His Eminence Lucien Bonaparte
- Prince of Canino and Musignano; Cardinal-Priest of San Lorenzo in Lucina
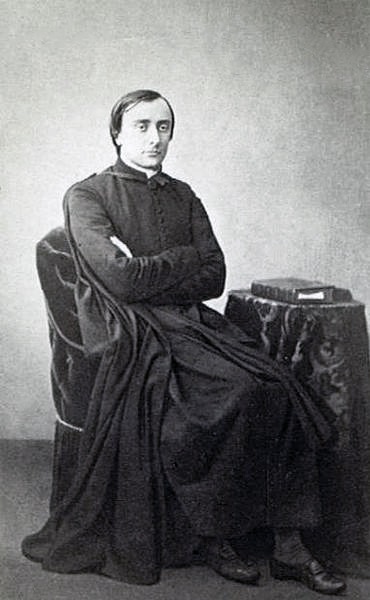
- Cardinal Bonaparte in 1860
- Church: Catholic Church
- In office: 1879–1895
- Previous posts: Camerlengo of the Sacred College of Cardinals (1876–1877); Cardinal-Priest of Santa Pudenziana (1868–1879)

Orders
- Ordination: 13 December 1857 by Pope Pius IX
- Created cardinal: 13 March 1868 by Pope Pius IX
- Rank: Cardinal-Priest

Personal details
- Born: 15 November 1828 Rome, Papal States
- Died: 19 November 1895 (aged 67) Rome, Kingdom of Italy
- Buried: Campo Verano, Rome
- Parents: Charles Lucien Bonaparte, Zénaïde Bonaparte
- Coat of arms: Lucien Bonaparte's coat of arms

Lucien Louis Joseph Napoléon Bonaparte, 4th Prince of Canino and Musignano (15 November 1828 – 19 November 1895), was a French cardinal and member of the House of Bonaparte.

== Life and career ==
He was born in Rome, the son of Charles Lucien Bonaparte and his wife, Zénaïde Bonaparte. His paternal grandparents were Lucien Bonaparte and his second wife, Alexandrine de Bleschamp. His maternal grandparents were Joseph Bonaparte and Julie Clary. His godfather was the future Napoleon III, first cousin to both his parents.

He was ordained to the priesthood on 13 December 1856 by Pope Pius IX, giving up his Italian title. He served at numerous posts both in France and in Italy. He was created Cardinal of Santa Pudenziana in 1868. In 1879, he was given the additional title of Cardinal Priest of S. Lorenzo in Lucina, as in this year Napoleon III's progeny had died out, while cardinal Lucien was the most genealogically senior member of the Bonaparte family (but born in a not-dynastic branch of the family, for the marriage of his grandparents).

Cardinal Bonaparte participated in the First Vatican Council. He also was one of the voting cardinals that elected Gioacchino Vincenzo Raffaele Luigi Cardinal Pecci, as Pope Leo XIII. He died in 1895 and was buried in Rome.

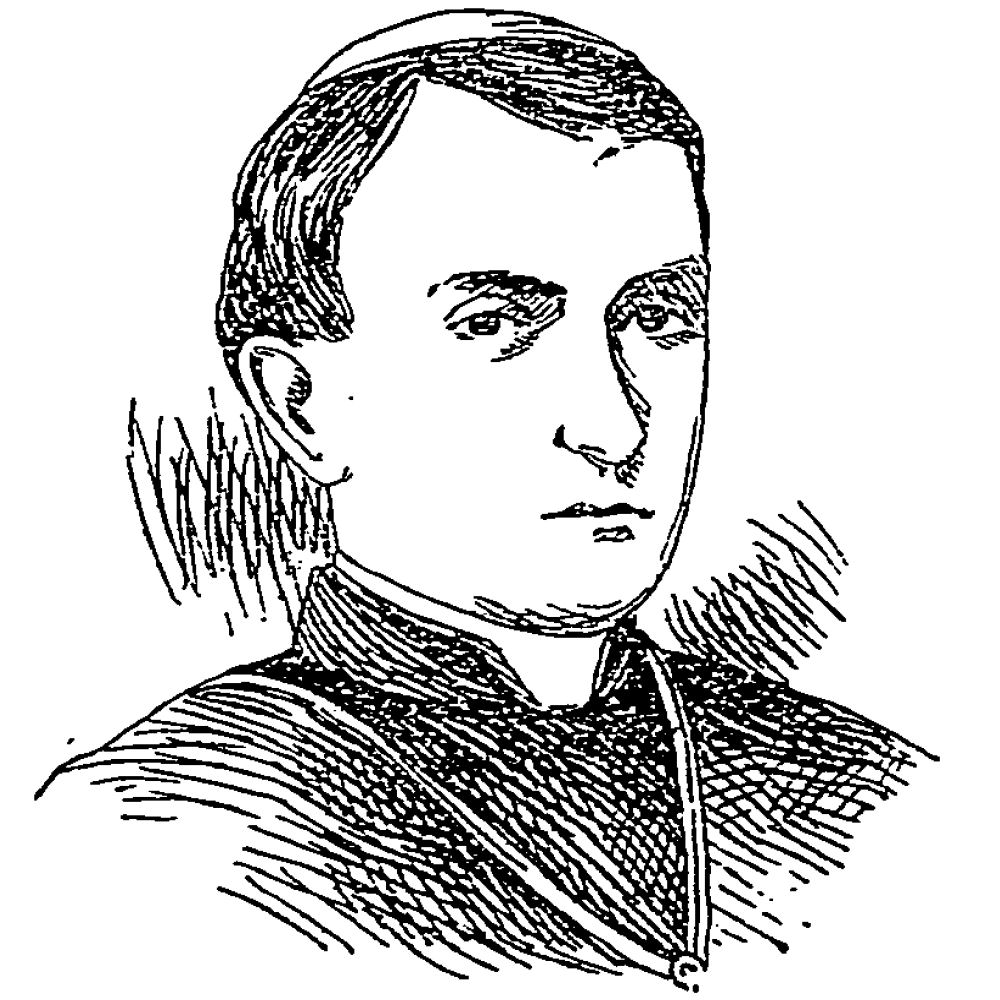
Lucien Cardinal Bonaparte

Styles of Lucien Cardinal Bonaparte
- Reference style: His Eminence
- Spoken style: Your Eminence
- Religious style: Monsignor
- Informal style: Cardinal
- See: None

== Ancestry ==
Ancestors of Lucien Bonaparte (cardinal)

16. Giuseppe Maria Buonaparte
8. Carlo Buonaparte
17. Maria-Saveria Paravicini
4. Lucien Bonaparte, 1st Prince of Canino and Musignano
18. Giovanni Geronimo Ramolino
9. Letizia Ramolino
19. Angela Maria Pietrasanta
2. Charles Lucien Bonaparte, 2nd Prince of Canino and Musignano
20. Nicolas Jacob de Bleschamp
10. Charles Jacob de Bleschamp
21. Marguerite Dehorgue
5. Alexandrine de Bleschamp
22. Jean-Charles Bouvet
11. Philiberte Bouvet
23. Marie Gasparde Grimod de Verneuil
1. Lucien Louis Joseph Napoléon, Cardinal Bonaparte, 4th Prince of Canino and Musignano
24. Giuseppe Maria Buonaparte (=16)
12. Carlo Buonaparte (=8)
25. Maria-Saveria Paravicini (=17)
6. Joseph Bonaparte, King of Spain
26. Giovanni Geronimo Ramolino (=18)
13. Letizia Ramolino (=9)
27. Angela Maria Pietrasanta (=19)
3. Princess Zénaïde Bonaparte
28. Joseph Clary
14. François Clary
29. Françoise Agnès Ammoric
7. Julie Clary
30. Joseph Ignace Somis
15. Françoise Rose Somis
31. Catherine Rose Soucheiron

Lucien Bonaparte (cardinal) House of Bonaparte Born: 15 November 1828 Died: 19 November 1895
Titles of nobility
Preceded by Joseph, 3rd Prince	Prince of Canino and Musignano; 1865–1895	Succeeded by Napoléon Charles, 5th Prince
