= Joseph Lucien Bonaparte =

- Prince of Canino and Musignano
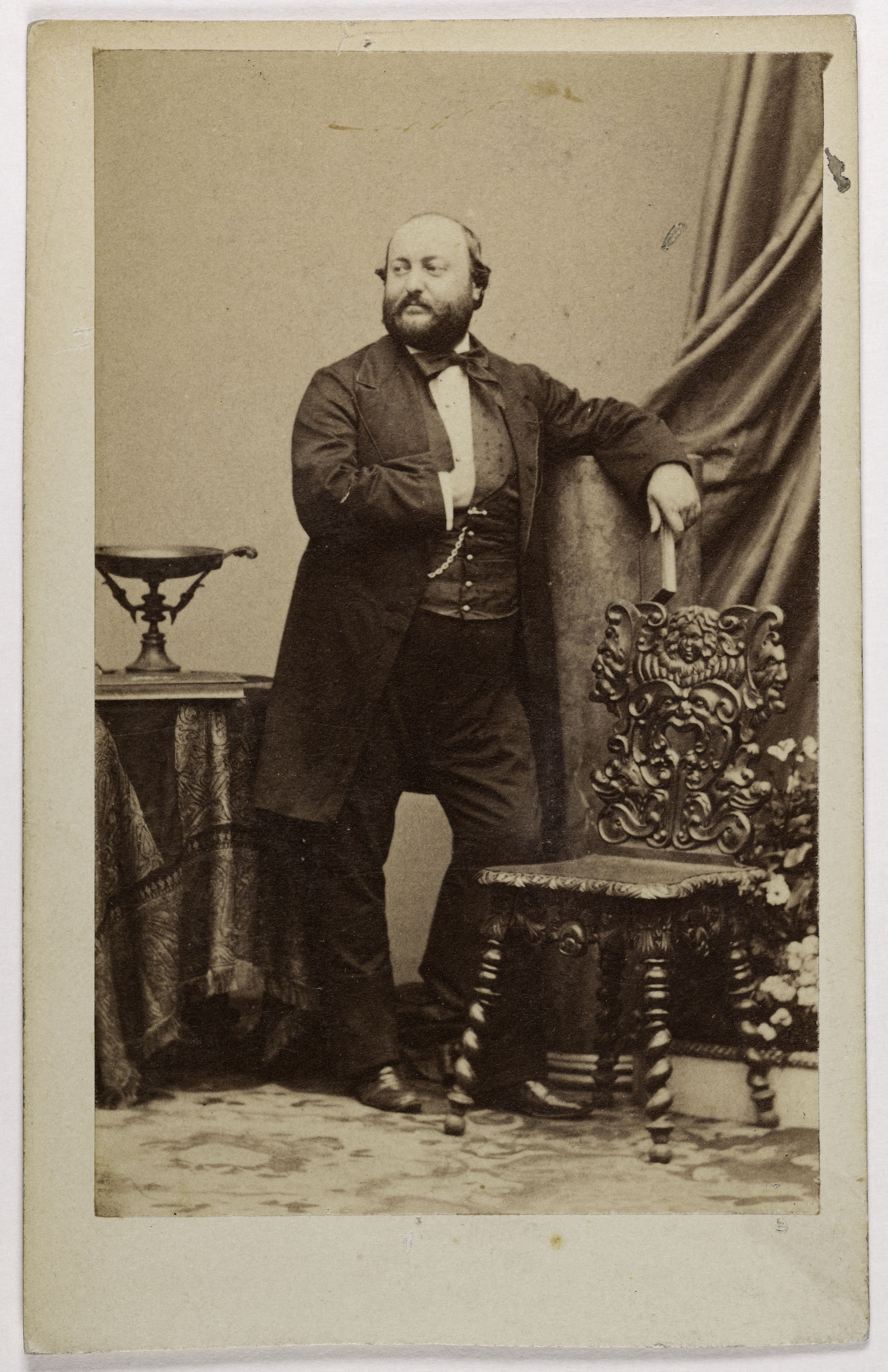
- Born: 12 February 1824; Philadelphia, Pennsylvania
- Died: 2 September 1865 (aged 41)
Names
- Joseph Lucien Charles Napoléon Bonaparte
- House: Bonaparte
- Father: Charles Lucien Bonaparte, 2nd Prince of Canino and Musignano
- Mother: Princess Zénaïde Bonaparte

Joseph Lucien Charles Napoléon Bonaparte, 3rd Prince of Canino and Musignano (12 February 1824 – 2 September 1865), was born in Philadelphia as the son of Charles Lucien Bonaparte and his wife (and cousin), Zénaïde Bonaparte.

Upon his grandfather Joseph Bonaparte's death in 1844, Joseph Lucien inherited the estate at Point Breeze in Bordentown, New Jersey. Joseph Lucien did not keep the properties and instead put Point Breeze up to be auctioned in 1847. It was bought by businessman Thomas Richards, who was a founder of the Jackson Glass Works in Batsto, New Jersey.

Joseph Lucien succeeded his father as 3rd Prince of Canino and Musignano upon his death on 29 July 1857. Following the death of Joseph Lucien at the age of 41 in Rome, his brother Lucien succeeded him as 4th Prince of Canino and Musignano.

== Ancestry ==
Ancestors of Joseph Lucien Bonaparte

8. Carlo Maria Buonaparte (=12)
4. Lucien Bonaparte, 1st Prince of Canino and Musignano
9. Maria Letizia Ramolino (=13)
2. Charles Lucien Bonaparte, 2nd Prince of Canino and Musignano
10. Charles Jacob de Bleschamp
5. Alexandrine de Bleschamp
11. Philiberte Bouvet
1. Joseph Lucien Bonaparte, 3rd Prince of Canino and Musignano
12. Carlo Maria Buonaparte (=8)
6. José I of Spain
13. Maria Letizia Ramolino (=9)
3. Princess Zénaïde Bonaparte
14. François Clary
7. Julie Clary
15. Françoise Rose Somis

Joseph Lucien Bonaparte House of Bonaparte Born: 12 February 1824 Died: 2 September 1865
Titles of nobility
Preceded by Charles	Prince of Canino and Musignano; 1857–1865	Succeeded by Lucien
