= Point Breeze (estate) =

- U.S. National Register of Historic Places
- U.S. Historic district
- New Jersey Register of Historic Places
- Second Bonaparte manor at Point Breeze

- Location within Burlington County, New Jersey Location within New Jersey Location within the United States
- Location: U.S. Route 206 and Park Street, Bordentown, New Jersey
- Coordinates: 40°9′22″N 74°42′30″W
- Area: 85 acres (34 ha)
- Architectural style: Italianate, Georgian Revival
- NRHP reference No.: 77000848
- NJRHP No.: 752

Significant dates
- Added to NRHP: August 10, 1977
- Designated NJRHP: October 22, 1976

Point Breeze was an estate in Bordentown, New Jersey. It was the home of Joseph Bonaparte, the brother of Napoleon Bonaparte, from 1816 to 1839. At the time of the first mansion's construction in 1819, it was the largest residence in the United States.

== Bonaparte estate ==
=== Grounds ===
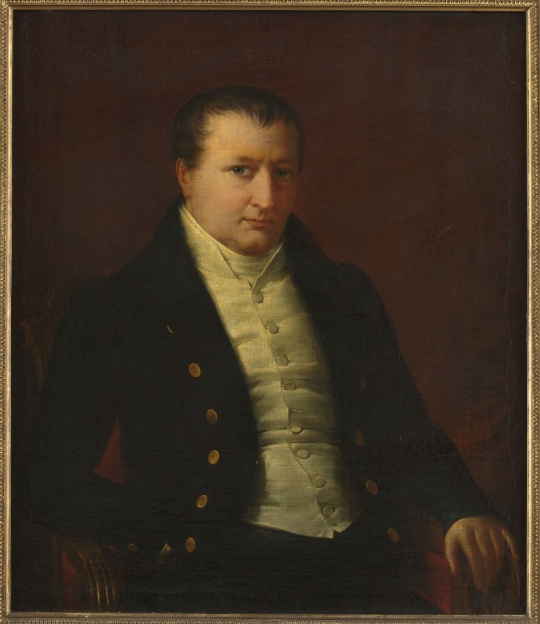
King Joseph at Point Breeze, portrait of Joseph Bonaparte painted at the estate on 2 February 1832, by Innocent-Louis Goubaud

In 1816, after fleeing Europe following the defeat of his brother at Waterloo, Joseph Bonaparte bought the property and the land from American diplomat Stephen Sayre (1736–1818). The estate was located on a promontory which overlooked Crosswicks Creek and the Delaware River.

He very quickly replaced the existing house with a new mansion and acquired more land, eventually owning more than 1,800 acres (730 ha). Bonaparte then set about making the estate the center of society on the East Coast; numerous members of high society, politicians, and overseas dignities visited what became known as Bonaparte's Park. Soon it became famous for its landscape, gardens, extensive art collection (with more than 150 paintings by Flemish and Italian masters), and 8,000 volume library, which was one of the largest libraries in the United States at the time.

Bonaparte had the original painting of his brother Napoleon Crossing the Alps by Jacques-Louis David prominently displayed in the house.

=== Mansions ===
On January 4, 1820, Bonaparte's first mansion burned down. Many of the furnishings and books from the house were saved by neighbors and servants who ran into the building while it was ablaze; they were publicly thanked by Bonaparte.

Following the fire, Bonaparte had a new mansion built. It was larger than the first, with the existing stables enlarged and moved further back from the promontory. Construction was supervised by French émigré Michel Bouvier. On completion, it was viewed - perhaps diplomatically - as the “second-finest house in America” (after the White House).

In 1839 Joseph Bonaparte returned to Europe, never to come back to Point Breeze. When he died in Florence, Italy in 1844, Point Breeze was inherited by his grandson Joseph Lucien Bonaparte, who sold the estate and most of its contents at auction three years later. The Philadelphia Museum of Art and the Pennsylvania Academy of Fine Arts later acquired a significant amount of furnishings and paintings from the house.

== Later ownership ==
By 1850, Point Breeze was owned by Hamilton Beckett, the son of Henry Beckett, the British consul in Philadelphia. After moving into the gatehouse, he had the main house torn down. A third mansion was built on the site which survived until 1983 when it was lost to a fire.

In 1874, the Vincentian Fathers of Philadelphia purchased Point Breeze for use as a summer retreat. In 1911, they sold it to industrialist Harris Hammond. After the 1929 stock market crash, the house was repossessed by the bank and lay vacant for over ten years.

In 1941, Divine Word Missionaries, another Catholic religious community, acquired the property. They used the property as a seminary and in later years as a retirement community.

In 2021, the property was jointly purchased by the state of New Jersey and a land preservation trust with the intent of establishing a public park.

== Archaeological exploration ==
Since 2006, Richard Veit, a professor of archaeology at Monmouth University, has led several archaeological digs on the property. The digs have unearthed over 20,000 artifacts, including shards of ceramic tableware, glass, wine bottles, door hardware, and tapestry buttons. Many of the recovered artifacts are charred by the 1820 fire.

== Preservation ==
The estate was added to the National Register of Historic Places on August 10, 1977, for its significance in architecture, landscape architecture, and politics/government. It includes five contributing buildings and two contributing sites.

In 2020, the City of Bordentown and D&R Greenway Land Trust partnering with the New Jersey Department of Environmental Protection acquired the remaining 60 acres of the estate for $4.6 million from Divine Word Missionaries. 5.6 acres (2.3 ha) of the site became the new municipal complex for the city which opened in August 2022. The remaining land will remain as open space with walking trails.

== Gallery ==
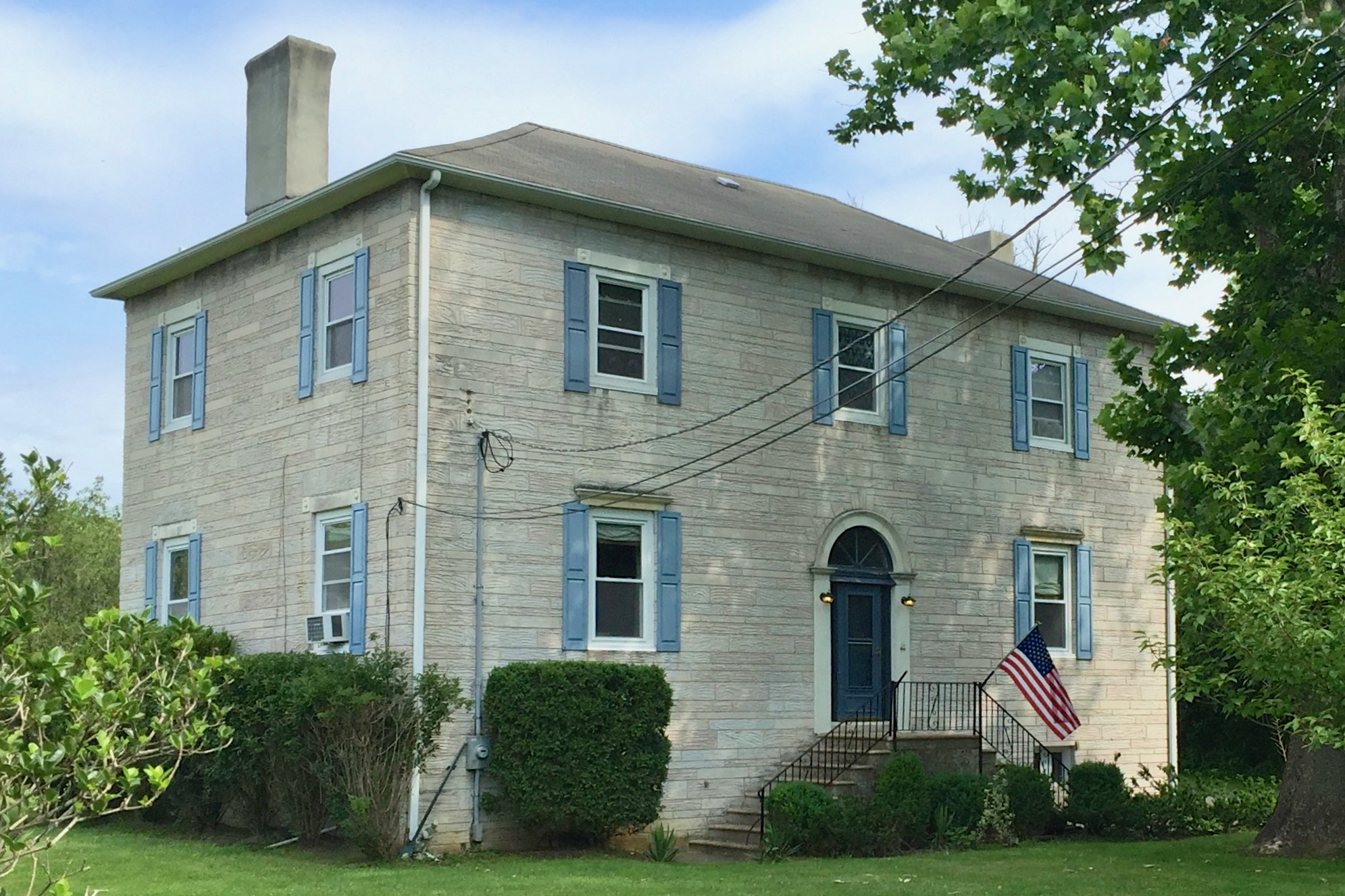
Garderner's house at Point Breeze, built by Bonaparte

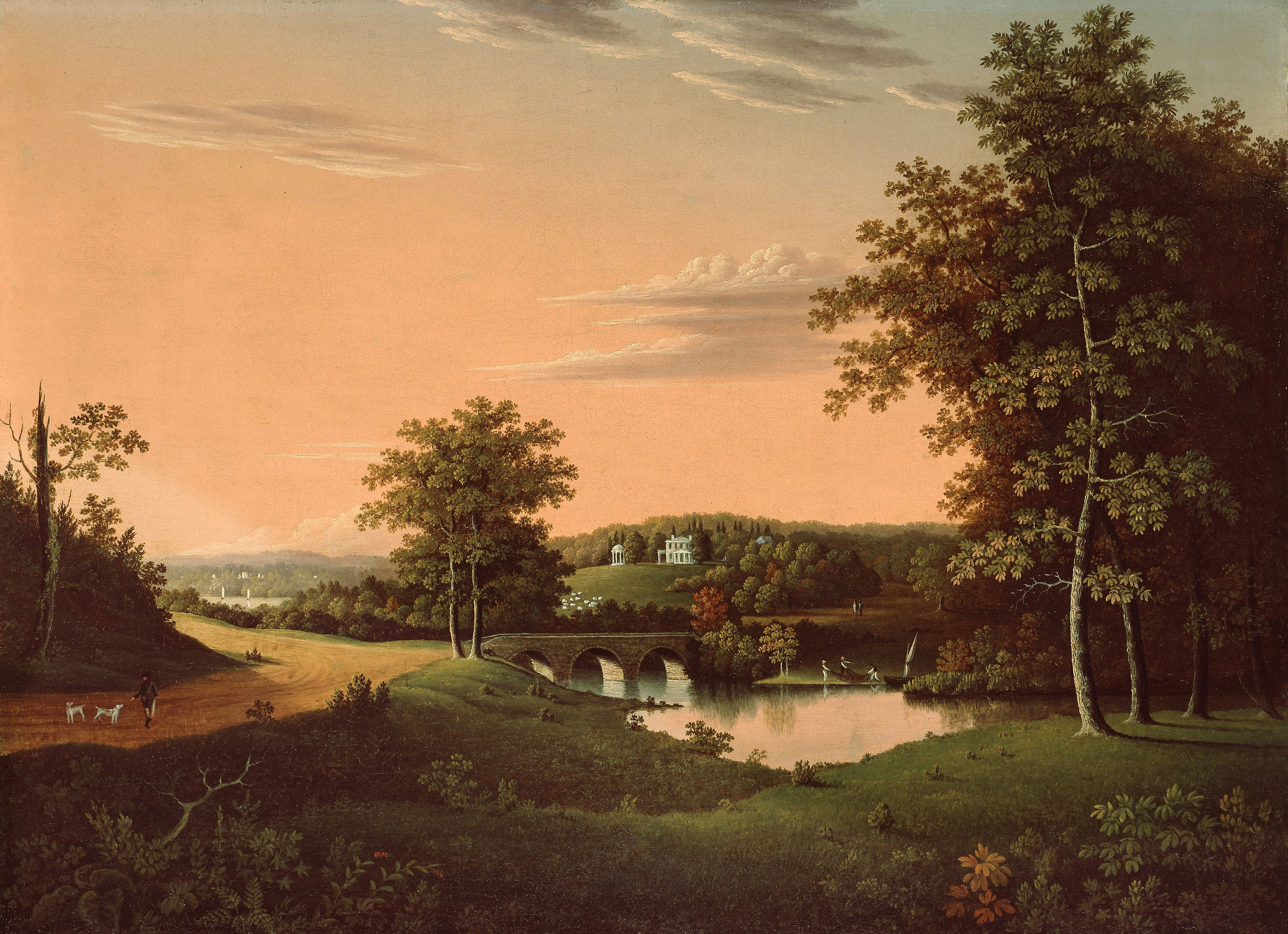
Landscape painting of the estate, attributed to Charles B. Lawrence, 1817–1820

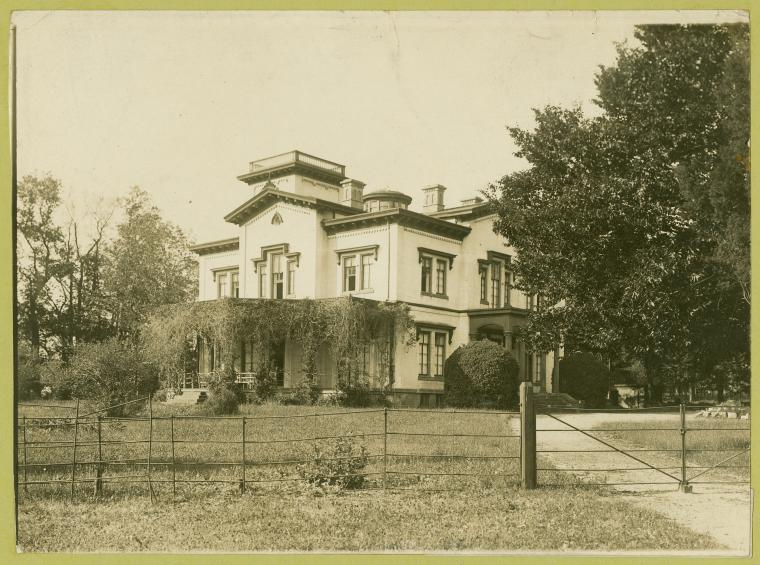
New mansion built by Beckett
