= Princess Béatrice of Bourbon-Two Sicilies =

French royal

Princess Béatrice
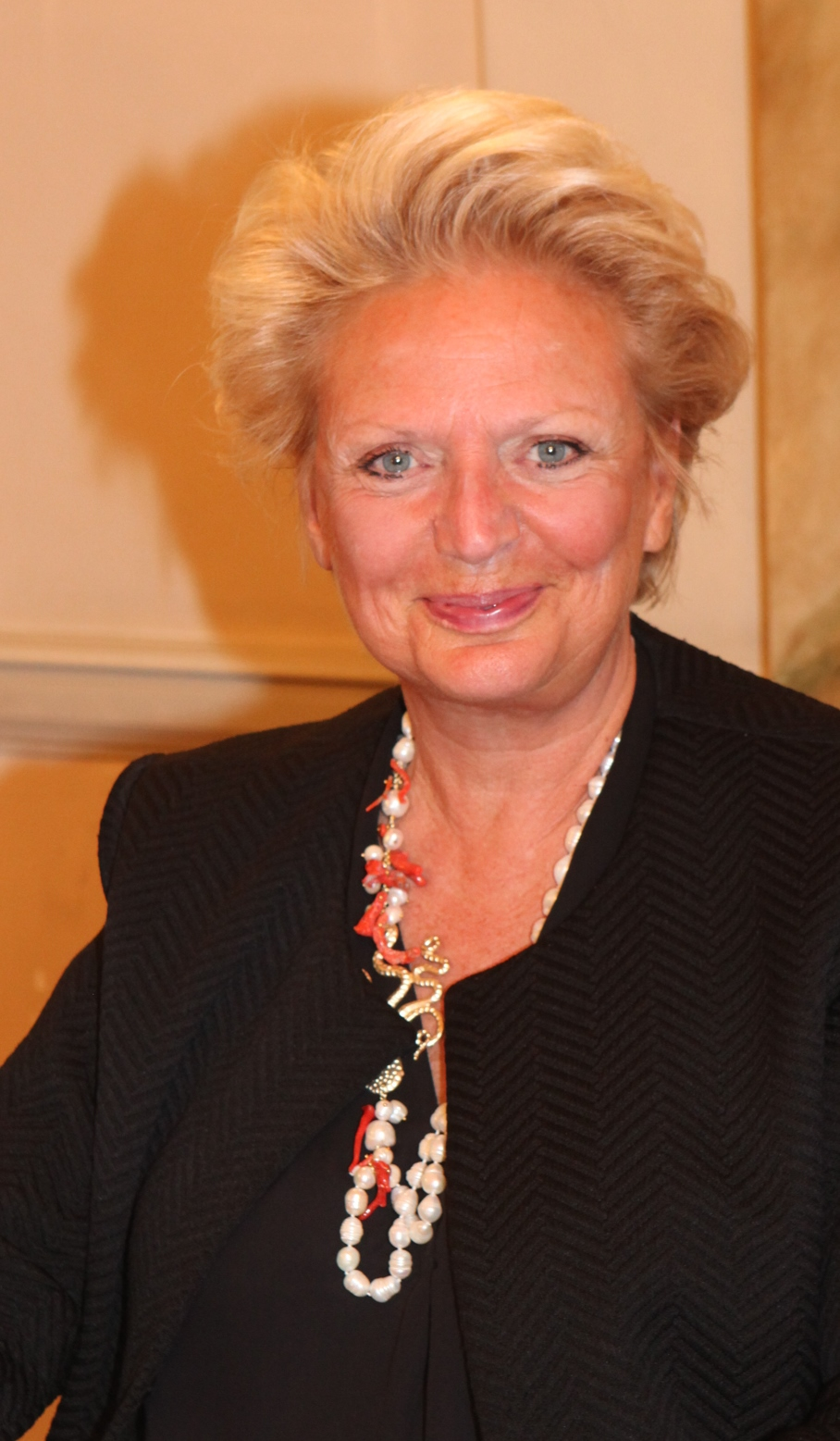
- Princess Béatrice in 2016
- Born: 16 June 1950 (age 76); Saint-Raphaël, Var, France
- Spouse: Prince Charles Bonaparte (m. 1978; div. 1989)
- Issue: Princess Caroline Bonaparte; Prince Jean-Christophe, Prince Napoléon
Names
- French: Béatrice Marie Caroline Louise Françoise de Bourbon
- House: Bourbon-Two Sicilies
- Father: Prince Ferdinand, Duke of Castro
- Mother: Chantal de Chevron-Villette

Princess Béatrice Marie Caroline Louise Françoise of Bourbon-Two Sicilies (born 16 June 1950 in Saint-Raphaël, Var, France) is the oldest daughter of Prince Ferdinand, Duke of Castro, Castro-line claimant to the headship of the House of Bourbon-Two Sicilies, and his wife, Chantal de Chevron-Villette.

Her younger brother, Prince Carlo, Duke of Castro, is the current Castro-line claimant to the headship of the House of Bourbon-Two Sicilies. Since 2014, Béatrice has been Grand Chancellor of the Sacred Military Constantinian Order of Saint George.

== Marriage and issue ==
Béatrice married Charles Napoléon Bonaparte, eldest son of Louis, Prince Napoléon and his wife, Alix de Foresta, on 19 December 1978 in Paris, France. Charles was the great-great-grandnephew of Napoleon I of France, founder of the Imperial House of France. The couple divorced in 1989.

Béatrice and Charles had two children, including Jean-Christophe, Prince Napoléon.

== Title, styles and honours ==
=== Title and styles ===
- Her Royal Highness Princess Béatrice of Bourbon-Two Sicilies

== Ancestry ==
Ancestors of Princess Béatrice of Bourbon-Two Sicilies

8. Prince Alfonso, Count of Caserta
4. Prince Ranieri, Duke of Castro
9. Princess Maria Antonietta of Bourbon-Two Sicilies
2. Prince Ferdinand, Duke of Castro
10. Count Andrzej Przemysław Zamoyski
5. Countess Maria Carolina Zamoyska
11. Princess Maria Carolina of Bourbon-Two Sicilies
1. Princess Béatrice of Bourbon-Two Sicilies
12. Charles Albert de Chevron-Villette
6. Pierre Joseph, Count of Chevron-Villette
13. Louise Fromentin de Saint Charles
3. Chantal de Chevron-Villette
14. Alphonse, Marquis of Colbert-Cannet
7. Marie de Colbert-Cannet
15. Anne Marie Brossier de La Roullière
