= Charles Lucien Bonaparte =

French biologist and art collector (1803–1857)

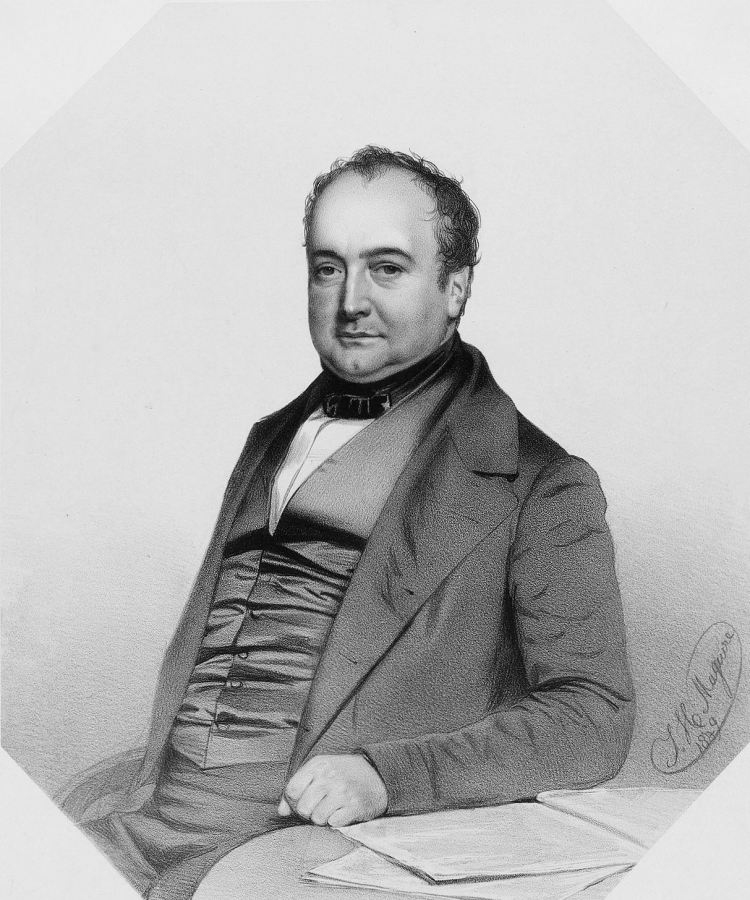
- Lithograph by Thomas Herbert Maguire, 1849
- Born: Charles Lucien Jules Laurent Bonaparte; 24 May 1803; Paris, France
- Died: 29 July 1857 (aged 54); Paris, France
- Occupations: Biologist, ornithologist
- Known for: Iconografia della Fauna Italica
- Title: Prince of Canino and Musignano
- Spouse: Princess Zénaïde Bonaparte (m. 1822; died 1854)
- Children: 12, including: Joseph, 3rd Prince of Canino and Musignano; Lucien, 4th Prince of Canino and Musignano; Augusta, Princess Gabrielli; Napoléon Charles Bonaparte, 5th Prince of Canino
- Parents: Lucien Bonaparte, 1st Prince of Canino and Musignano (father); Alexandrine de Bleschamp (mother)
- Relatives: Napoleon Bonaparte (uncle)
- Scientific career
- Author abbrev. (zoology): Bonaparte

Charles Lucien Jules Laurent Bonaparte, 2nd Prince of Canino and Musignano (French pronunciation: [ʃaʁl lysjɛ̃ ʒyl lɔʁɑ̃ bɔnapaʁt]; 24 May 1803 – 29 July 1857) was a French naturalist and ornithologist, and a nephew of Napoleon. Lucien and his wife had twelve children, including Cardinal Lucien Bonaparte.

== Life and career ==
Bonaparte was the son of Lucien Bonaparte and Alexandrine de Bleschamp. Lucien was a younger brother of Napoleon I, making Charles the emperor’s nephew. Born in Paris, he was raised in Italy. On 29 June 1822, he married his cousin, Zénaïde, in Brussels. Soon after the marriage, the couple left for Philadelphia in the United States to live with Zénaïde's father, Joseph Bonaparte (who was also the paternal uncle of Charles). Before leaving Italy, Charles had already discovered a warbler new to science, the moustached warbler, and on the voyage he collected specimens of a new storm petrel. On arrival in the United States, he presented a paper on this new bird, which was later named after Alexander Wilson.

He and his wife resided in the Lake House in his father-in-law's Point Breeze estate in Bordentown, New Jersey.

Bonaparte then set about studying the ornithology of the United States and updating Wilson's Ornithology or History of the Birds of the United States. The revised edition was published between 1825 and 1833. His other publications included "Observations on the Nomenclature of Wilson's Ornithology" (in the Journal of the Philadelphia Academy) and "Synopsis of the Birds of the United States" (in the Annals of the Lyceum of New York). In 1824, Bonaparte tried to get the then unknown John James Audubon accepted by the Academy of Natural Sciences, but this was opposed by the ornithologist George Ord who disliked Audubon's dramatic bird poses and considered him to be "a back-country upstart who romanticized his subject matter," according to the Audubon Galleries.

At the end of 1826, Bonaparte and his family returned to Europe. He visited Germany, where he met Philipp Jakob Cretzschmar, and England, where he met John Edward Gray at the British Museum, and renewed his acquaintance with Audubon. In 1828, the family settled in Rome. In Italy, he was the originator of several scientific congresses, and lectured and wrote extensively on American and European ornithology and other branches of natural history. Between 1832 and 1841, Bonaparte published his work on the animals of Italy, Iconografia della Fauna Italica. He had also published Specchio Comparativo delle Ornithologie di Roma e di Filadelfia (Pisa, 1827), presenting a comparison between birds of the latitude of Philadelphia and Italian species. He created the genus Zenaida, after his wife, for the zenaida dove and its relatives. He was elected a member of the American Antiquarian Society in 1845.

In 1840, he became Prince of Canino and Musignano after his father's death and became involved in politics, particularly the anti-Austrian party that he joined in 1848. He did not, however, lose interest in his favourite studies for he organized and presided over several scientific congresses in Italy.

In 1849, he was elected to the Roman Assembly and participated in the creation of the Roman Republic. According to Jasper Ridley, when the Assembly convened for the first time: "When the name of Carlo Bonaparte, who was a member for Viterbo, was called, he replied to the roll-call by calling out Long live the Republic!" (Viva la Repubblica!). He participated in the defense of Rome against the 40,000 French troops sent by his cousin Louis Napoleon. He left Rome after the Republican army was defeated in July 1849. He landed at Marseilles, but was ordered to leave the country by Louis Napoleon. He reaffirmed his political beliefs the following year in naming Wilson's bird-of-paradise (Cicinnurus respublica) in honor of the republican idea.

He travelled to the United Kingdom, attending the meeting of the British Association in Birmingham. He then visited Sir William Jardine in southern Scotland. Charles then began work on preparing a methodical classification of all the birds in the world, visiting museums across Europe to study the collections. In 1850, he was allowed to return to France and made Paris his home for the rest of his life. In 1854, he became director of the Jardin des Plantes. In 1855, he was made a foreign member of the Royal Swedish Academy of Sciences. He published the first volume of his Conspectus Generum Avium before his death, the second volume being edited by Hermann Schlegel.

Bonaparte also studied amphibians and reptiles, and is the author of Vipera ursinii, commonly known as Orsini's viper.

Bonaparte was extremely prolific and is responsible for coining Latin names for a large number of bird species. As of August 2019, in the online list of birds maintained by Frank Gill and David Donsker on behalf of the International Ornithological Committee (IOC), Bonaparte is credited as the authority for 165 genera, 203 species and 262 subspecies. He was credited with describing a rare Australian bird, Menura alberti (Albert's lyrebird), although this was based on a technicality as English ornithologist John Gould had previously described the bird but the supplement containing the description was published after Bonaparte had made reference to it.

Lucien Charles Bonaparte died in Paris at age 54.

== In film ==
In Luigi Magni's film In the Name of the Sovereign People (1990), Bonaparte is played by Carlo Croccolo.

== Honours ==
- 1823: Member of the American Philosophical Society in Philadelphia.
- 1845: Member of the Royal Academy of Science, Letters and Fine Arts of Belgium.

== Family ==
Prince Charles and Princess Zénaïde Bonaparte had twelve children, listed below:

Name	Date of birth	Date of death
Joseph Lucien Charles Napoleon Bonaparte, 3rd Prince of Canino and Musignano	13 February 1824	2 September 1865 (aged 41)
Alexandrine Gertrude Zénaïde Bonaparte	9 June 1826	May 1828 (age 2)
Lucien Louis Joseph Napoleon Bonaparte, 4th Prince of Canino and Musignano and later a Cardinal	15 November 1828	19 November 1895 (aged 67)
Julie Charlotte Bonaparte	5 June 1830	28 October 1900 (aged 70)
Charlotte Honorine Joséphine Pauline Bonaparte	4 March 1832	1 October 1901 (aged 69)
Léonie Stéphanie Elise Bonaparte	18 September 1833	14 September 1839 (aged 5)
Marie Désirée Eugénie Joséphine Philomène Bonaparte	18 March 1835	28 August 1890 (aged 55)
Augusta Amélie Maximilienne Jacqueline Bonaparte (married the son of Charlotte Bonaparte Gabrielli)	9 November 1836	29 March 1900 (aged 63)
Napoléon Charles Grégoire Jacques Philippe Bonaparte, 5th Prince of Canino and Musignano	5 February 1839	11 February 1899 (aged 60)
Bathilde Aloïse Léonie Bonaparte	26 November 1840	9 June 1861 (aged 20)
Albertine Marie Thérèse Bonaparte	12 March 1842	3 June 1842 (aged 0)
Charles Albert Bonaparte	22 March 1843	6 December 1847 (aged 4)

== Ancestry ==
Ancestors of Charles Lucien Bonaparte

8. Giuseppe Maria Buonaparte
4. Carlo Maria Buonaparte
9. Maria Saveria Paravicini
2. Lucien Bonaparte
10. Giovanni Geronimo Ramolino
5. Maria Letizia Ramolino
11. Angela Maria Pietrasanta
1. Charles Lucien Bonaparte
12. Nicolas Jacob de Bleschamp
6. Charles Jacob de Bleschamp
13. Marguerite de Horgnes
3. Alexandrine de Bleschamp
14. Jean Charles Bouvet
7. Philiberte Bouvet
15. Marie Gasparde Grimod de Verneuil

== Works ==
- American Ornithology, or, The Natural History of Birds Inhabiting the United States, not given by Wilson (4 vols., Philadelphia, 1825-1833). This work contains more than 100 new species discovered by Bonaparte.
- Conspectus Generum Avium (Leyden, 1850)
- Revue critique de l'ornithologie Européenne (Brussels, 1850)
- Monographie des loxiens (Leyden, 1850) in collaboration with H. Schlegel
- Catalogue des oiseaux d'Europe (Paris, 1856)
- Memoirs (New York, 1836)

In conjunction with M. de Pouancé, he also prepared descriptive catalogue of pigeons and one of parrots which were published after his death. Among his papers published are:

- “Observations on the Nomenclature of Wilson's ‘Ornithology,’” Journal of the Academy of Philadelphia
- “Synopsis of the Birds of the United States,” Annals of the Lyceum of New York
- “Catalogue of the Birds of the United States,” Contributions of the Maclurian Lyceum of Philadelphia

He published several scientific papers on ornithological topics in the Bolognese journal Nuovi annali delle scienze naturali, as Carlo Luciano Bonaparte.

== Taxa described ==
- Category:Taxa named by Charles Lucien Bonaparte

as Bonaparte described over 500 species.

== Taxa named in honor ==
Several birds are named after him:

- Bonaparte's gull - Chroicocephalus philadelphia
- Bonaparte's nightjar - Caprimulgus concretus
- Bonaparte's parakeet - Pyrrhura lucianii
- Highland tinamou Nothocercus bonapartei
- The Napoleon snake eel Ophichthus bonaparti, also known as the Napoleon Eel, the Purplebanded Snake Eel, or the Saddled snake-eel is named after him.

Charles Lucien Bonaparte House of Bonaparte Born: 24 May 1803 Died: 29 July 1857
Titles of nobility
Preceded by Lucien I	Prince of Canino and Musignano; 1840–1857	Succeeded by Joseph
