= Zénaïde Bonaparte =

19th-century French noble

- Princess of Canino and Musignano
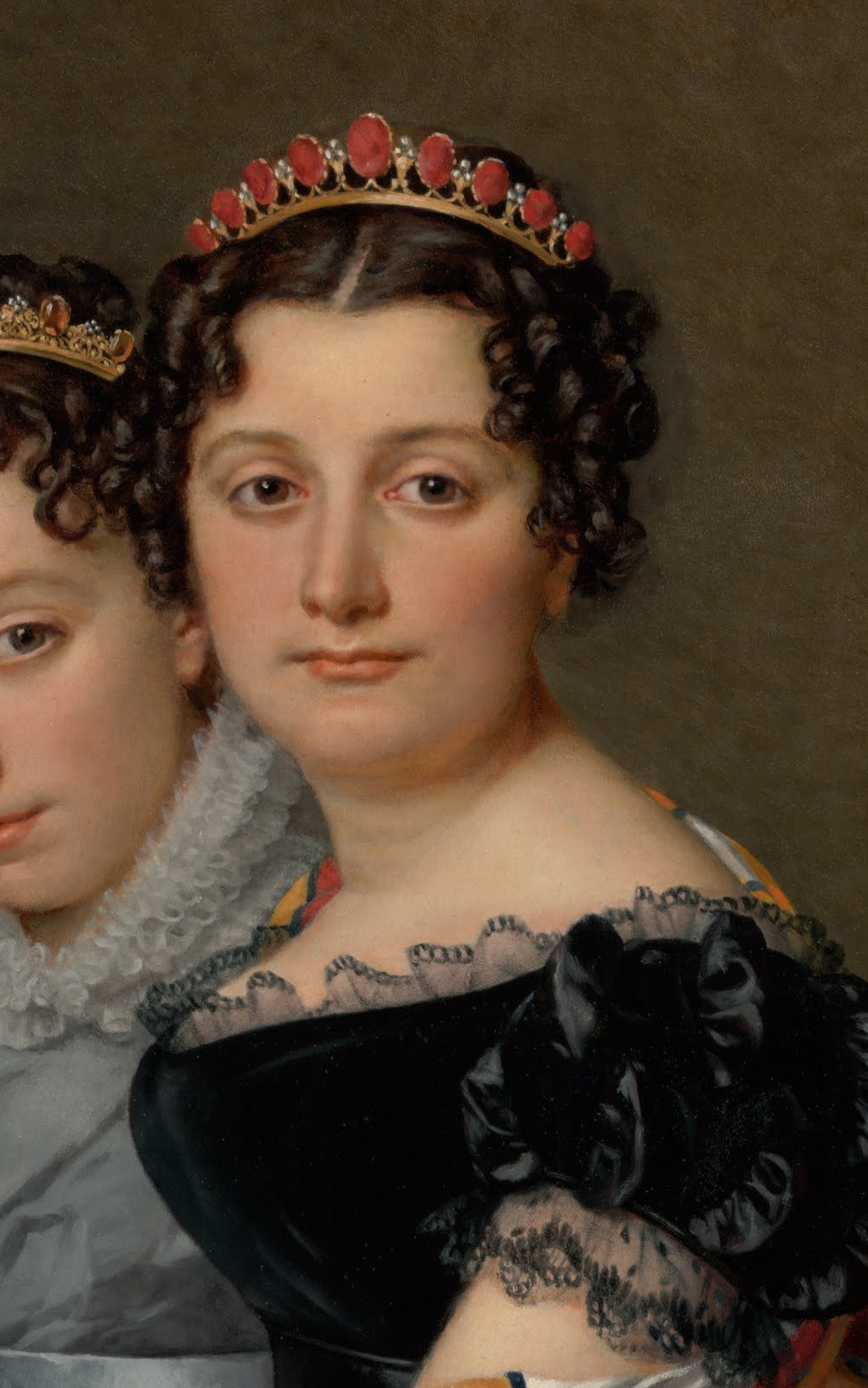
- Bonaparte in a detail of The Sisters Zénaïde and Charlotte Bonaparte by Jacques-Louis David, 1821
- Born: 8 July 1801; Paris, France
- Died: 8 August 1854 (aged 53); Naples, Kingdom of the Two Sicilies
- Burial: Santa Maria in Via Lata
- Spouse: Charles Lucien Bonaparte (m. 1822)
- Issue: Joseph, 3rd Prince of Canino and Musignano; Princess Alexandrine; Lucien, 4th Prince of Canino and Musignano; Princess Julie; Princess Charlotte; Princess Léonie; Princess Marie Désirée; Augusta, Princess Gabrielli; Napoléon Charles Bonaparte, 5th Prince of Canino; Princess Bathilde; Princess Albertine; Prince Charles
Names
- Zénaïde Laetitia Julie Bonaparte
- House: Bonaparte
- Father: Joseph Bonaparte
- Mother: Julie Clary

Zénaïde Laetitia Julie Bonaparte, Princess of Canino and Musignano (8 July 1801 – 8 August 1854) was the elder daughter of Joseph Bonaparte and Julie Clary, and thus the niece of Napoleon Bonaparte, and the wife of naturalist Charles Lucien Bonaparte, who was also her cousin. She joined her father in exile for several years in Bordentown, New Jersey.

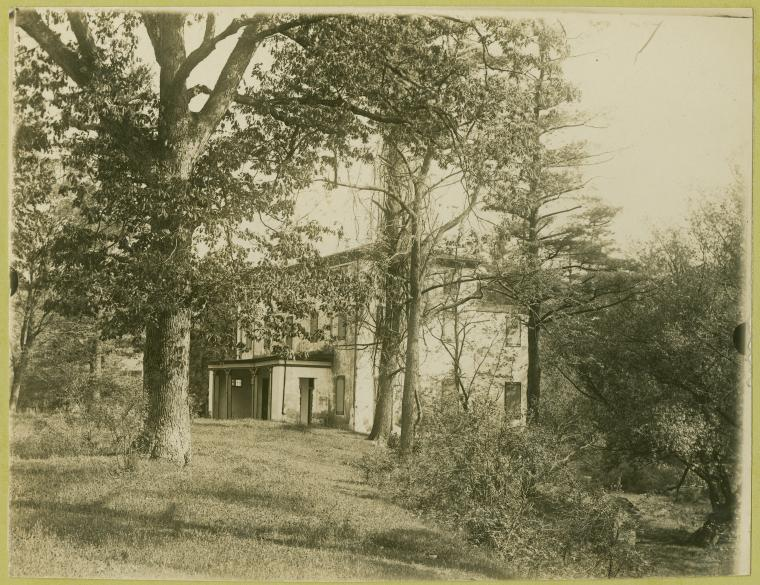
View of Princess Zenaïde's former residence, Bordentown, New Jersey

== Biography ==
Zénaïde Bonaparte was born on July 8, 1801 in Paris . She was the second of three daughters of Joseph Bonaparte , who was then carrying out diplomatic missions at the request of his brother, First Consul Napoleon Bonaparte , and Julie Clary , the daughter of a wealthy shipowner and merchant from Marseille . She spent her childhood between Paris and the estate her parents had acquired in Mortefontaine . When her father was appointed King of Naples in 1806, Zénaïde joined him two years later on April 14, 1808, with her mother Julie and her little sister Charlotte. When Joseph was appointed King of Spain a few months later, the three of them returned to France to settle in Mortefontaine. During this period, Zénaïde corresponded regularly with her father by letter. From a very young age, she had a talent for music.

After Napoleon I 's first abdication in 1814, Zénaïde, her mother and her sister joined Joseph in exile in Switzerland, at the Château de Prangins [ 4 ] . They returned to Paris during the Hundred Days [ 5 ] , then settled with Désirée Clary , Julie's sister, during the first months of Joseph's second exile in the United States [ 6 ] .

When she was 14, in 1815, Napoleon offered Zénaïde in marriage to King Ferdinand VII of Spain, but the offer was refused. There had been earlier plans to marry Zénaïde to the son of then marshal Jean-Baptiste Bernadotte, Oscar, who were also her cousin, but the plans were later abandoned.

After the fall of her uncle Emperor Napoleon in 1815, her father moved to America and purchased Point Breeze, an estate on the Delaware River in Bordentown, New Jersey. Zénaïde and her sister, however, stayed with their mother in Europe. They lived in Frankfurt and Brussels from 1815 to 1821, and then in Florence.

On 29 June 1822, in Brussels, she married her cousin Charles Lucien Bonaparte, son of her uncle Lucien. Her father Joseph had suggested marriage to his wife when Zénaïde was only five; the idea was to carry on the Napoleonic succession (a return to power was always anticipated) by marrying his two daughters to sons of two of his brothers.

The wedding was met with surprisingly little fanfare, perhaps because Zénaïde's mother was outraged at the excessive sum of the dowry (730,000 francs, which was unreasonable considering that Lucien's villa in Rome had cost only 150,000), which had strained her resources.

In 1823, after emigrating to the United States, she and her husband resided in the Lake House on her father's Point Breeze estate.

Charles was an ornithologist (who named the genus Zenaida after her). They had twelve children, listed below.

== Issue ==
Name	Date of birth	Date of death
Joseph Lucien Charles Napoléon Bonaparte, 3rd Prince of Canino and Musignano	13 February 1824	2 September 1865 (aged 41)
Alexandrine Gertrude Zénaïde Bonaparte	9 June 1826	1 May 1828 (aged 1)
Lucien Louis Joseph Napoléon Bonaparte, 4th Prince of Canino and Musignano	15 November 1828	19 November 1895 (aged 67)
Julie Charlotte Bonaparte (married Alessandro del Gallo Marquess of Roccagiovine)	5 June 1830	28 October 1900 (aged 70)
Charlotte Honorine Joséphine Pauline Bonaparte (married Pietro Primoli Count of Foglia, had two sons: Joseph and Louis)	4 March 1832	1 October 1901 (aged 69)
Léonie Stéphanie Elise Bonaparte	18 September 1833	14 September 1839 (aged 5)
Marie Désirée Eugénie Joséphine Philomène Bonaparte (married Count Paolo Campello della Spina)	18 March 1835	28 August 1890 (aged 55)
Augusta Amélie Maximilienne Jacqueline Bonaparte (married Placido Gabrielli, son of Charlotte Bonaparte, Princess Gabrielli)	9 November 1836	29 March 1900 (aged 63)
Napoléon Charles Grégoire Jacques Philippe Bonaparte, 5th Prince of Canino and Musignano	5 February 1839	11 February 1899 (aged 60)
Bathilde Aloïse Léonie Bonaparte (married Louis, Comte de Cambacérès)	26 November 1840	9 June 1861 (aged 20)
Albertine Marie Thérèse Bonaparte	12 March 1842	3 June 1842 (aged 0)
Charles Albert Bonaparte	22 March 1843	6 December 1847 (aged 4)

== Ancestry ==
Ancestors of Zénaïde Bonaparte

16. Sebastiano Nicola Buonaparte
8. Giuseppe Maria Buonaparte
17. Maria Anna Tusoli
4. Carlo Maria Buonaparte
18. Giuseppe Maria Paravicini
9. Maria Saveria Paravicini
19. Maria Angela Salineri
2. Giuseppe Napoleone Buonaparte
20. Giovanni Agostino Ramolino
10. Giovanni Geronimo Ramolino
21. Angela Maria Peri
5. Maria Letizia Ramolino
22. Giuseppe Maria Pietrasanta
11. Angela Maria Pietrasanta
23. Maria Giuseppa Malerba
1. Zénaïde Laetitia Julie Bonaparte
24. Jacques Clary
12. Joseph Clary
25. Catherine Barosse
6. François Clary
26. François Ammoric
13. Françoise Agnès Ammoric
27. Jeanne Boisson
3. Marie Julie Clary
28. Jean Louis Somis
14. Joseph Ignace Somis
29. Françoise Bouchard
7. Françoise Rose Somis
30. François Soucheiron
15. Catherine Rose Soucheiron
31. Anne Cautier

== Bibliography ==
- Glover, Michael, The Peninsular War 1807–1814. London: Penguin Books, 2001. ISBN 0-14-139041-7
- Stroud, Patricia Tyson. The Emperor of Nature: Charles-Lucien Bonaparte and His World. Philadelphia: University of Pennsylvania Press, 2000. ISBN 0-8122-3546-0.
