= Alexandrine de Bleschamp =

French-Italian princess

- Princess of Canino and Musignano
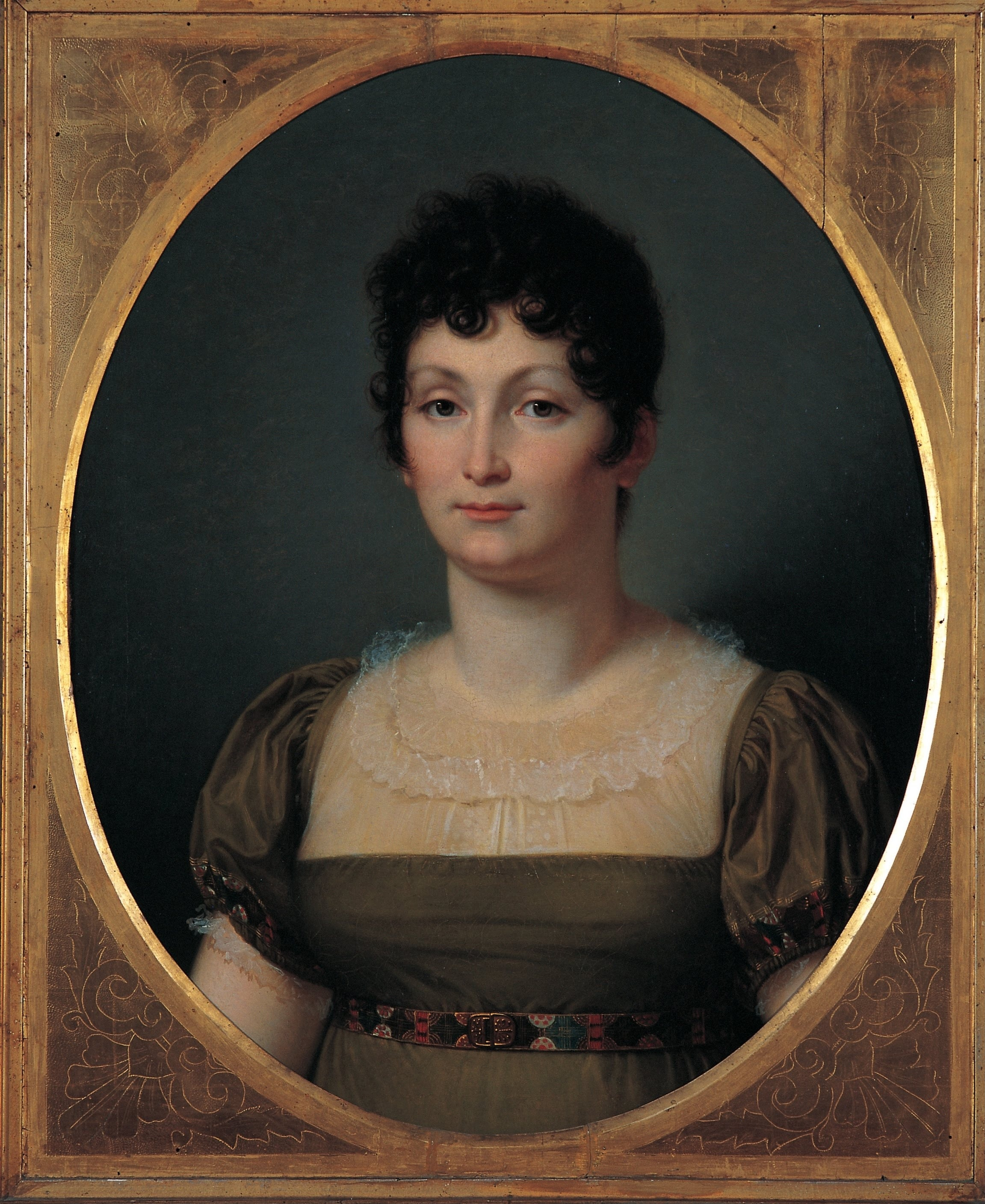
- 1808 portrait
- Born: Alexandrine de Bleschamp; 23 February 1778
- Died: 12 July 1855 (aged 77)
- Spouse: Hippolyte Jouberthon de Vambertin (m. 1798; died 1802) Lucien Bonaparte, 1st Prince of Canino and Musignano (m. 1803; died 1840)
- Issue: Anne Jouberthon; Charles Lucien Bonaparte; Letizia Bonaparte; Joseph Bonaparte; Jeanne Bonaparte; Paul Marie Bonaparte; Louis Lucien Bonaparte; Pierre Napoleon Bonaparte; Antoine Bonaparte; Marie Alexandrine Bonaparte; Constance Bonaparte
- House: Bonaparte (by marriage)

Alexandrine Bonaparte, Princess of Canino and Musignano (née Alexandrine de Bleschamp [alɛksɑ̃dʁin də bleʃɑ̃]; 23 February 1778 – 12 July 1855) was a French aristocrat and by marriage member of the French Imperial family.

== Personal life ==
She was first married to the banker, Jean François Hippolyte Jouberthon de Vambertin, and thus known in society as Madame Jouberthon. They had one child, Anne (1799–1845), who was married firstly to Alfonso, Prince Hercolani (1799–1827) and secondly to Maurycy, Prince Jablonowski. Alexandrine was already a widow when she became the second wife of Lucien Bonaparte, a younger brother of Napoleon I of France, in 1803.

== Issue ==
She and her first husband had a daughter:

- Anne Jouberthon (1799–1845), who was married firstly to Alfonso, Prince Hercolani (1799–1827) and secondly to Maurycy, Prince Jablonowski (1809–1868).

She and her second husband had ten children:

- Charles Lucien Bonaparte (24 May 1803 – 29 July 1857), the naturalist and ornithologist.
- Letizia Bonaparte (1 December 1804 – 15 March 1871), married Sir Thomas Wyse.
- Joseph Bonaparte (14 June 1806 – 15 August 1807).
- Jeanne Bonaparte (22 July 1807 – 22 September 1829), married Marquis Honoré Honorati.
- Paul Marie Bonaparte (3 November 1809 – 7 September 1827).
- Louis Lucien Bonaparte (4 January 1813 – 3 November 1891). A philologist and politician, expert on the Basque language.
- Pierre Napoleon Bonaparte (11 October 1815 – 7 April 1881).
- Antoine Bonaparte (31 October 1816 – 28 March 1877), married Marie-Anne Cardinali, without issue.
- Marie Alexandrine Bonaparte (10 October 1818 – 20 August 1874), married Vincenzo Valentini, Count di Laviano.
- Constance Bonaparte (30 January 1823 – 5 September 1876), a nun.

== Ancestry ==
Ancestors of Alexandrine de Bleschamp

4. Nicolas Jacob de Bleschamp
2. Charles Jacob de Bleschamp
10. Pierre Dehorgue
5. Marguerite Dehorgue
11. Jeanne Poindrette
1. Alexandrine de Bleschamp
6. Jean-Charles Bouvet
3. Philiberte Bouvet
14. Antoine François Grimod de Verneuil
7. Marie Gasparde Grimod de Verneuil
15. Marie Suzanne Papet

== Sources ==
- Hans Naef, 'Who's Who in Ingres's Portrait of the Family of Lucien Bonaparte?', The Burlington Magazine, Vol. 114, No. 836 (Nov., 1972), pp. 787–791
- Alexandrine as Terpsichore, by Canova
