= Bonapartism =

French political ideology

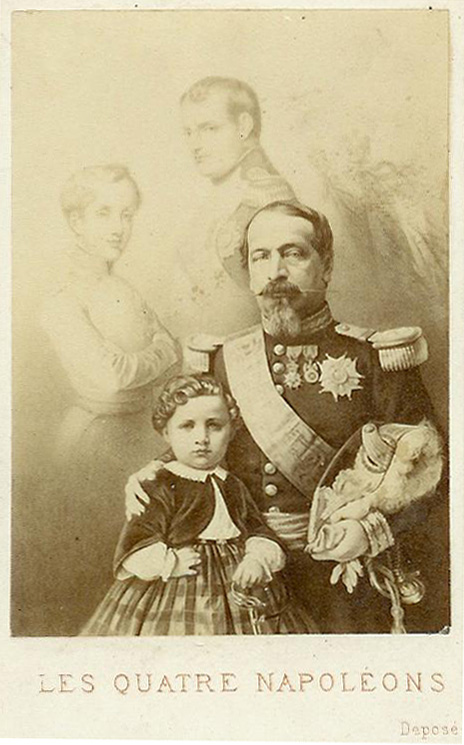
"The Four Napoleons", 1858 propaganda image depicting Napoleon I, Napoleon II, Napoleon III, and Louis-Napoléon, Prince Imperial

Bonapartism (French: Bonapartisme [bɔnapaʁtism]) is the political ideology supervening from Napoleon Bonaparte and his legacy. The term is used in the narrow sense to refer to people who hoped to restore the House of Bonaparte and its style of government. In this sense, a Bonapartiste was a person who either actively participated in or advocated for imperial Political factions in 19th-century France. Although Bonapartism emerged in 1814 with the first fall of Napoleon, it only developed doctrinal clarity and cohesion by the 1840s.

The term developed a broad definition used to mean political movements that advocate for an authoritarian centralised state, with a military strongman and charismatic leader with relatively traditionalist ideology.

== Beliefs ==
Marxism and Leninism developed a vocabulary of political terms that included Bonapartism, derived from analysis of the career of Napoleon Bonaparte. Karl Marx, a student of Jacobinism and the French Revolution, was a contemporary critic of the Second Republic and the Second Empire.

Noted political scientists and historians greatly differ on the definition and interpretation of Bonapartism. Sudhir Hazareesingh's book The Legend of Napoleon explores numerous interpretations of the term.

== Bonapartist claimants ==
=== List of Bonapartist claimants to the French throne since 1814 ===
Those who ruled are indicated with an asterisk.

Claimant	Portrait	Birth	Marriages	Death
Napoleon I* 1814–1815; 1815–1821		15 August 1769, Ajaccio; Son of Carlo Buonaparte and Letizia Ramolino	Joséphine de Beauharnais; 9 March 1796; No children Marie Louise, Duchess of Parma; 11 March 1810; 1 child	5 May 1821; Longwood, Saint Helena; Aged 51
Napoleon II*; 1811–1832		20 March 1811, Paris; Son of Napoleon I and Marie Louise of Austria	Never married	22 July 1832; Vienna; Aged 21
Joseph Bonaparte (Joseph I); 1832–1844		7 January 1768, Corte; Son of Carlo Buonaparte and Letizia Ramolino	Julie Clary; 1 August 1794; 2 children	28 July 1844; Florence; Aged 76
Louis Bonaparte (Louis I); 1844–1846		2 September 1778, Ajaccio; Son of Carlo Buonaparte and Letizia Ramolino	Hortense de Beauharnais; 4 January 1802; 3 children	25 July 1846; Livorno; Aged 67
Napoleon III*; 1846–1873; President of France (1848–1852); Emperor of the French (1852–1870)		20 April 1808, Paris; Son of Louis Bonaparte and Hortense de Beauharnais	Eugénie de Montijo; 30 January 1853; 1 child	9 January 1873; Chislehurst; Aged 64
Napoléon, Prince Imperial (Napoleon IV); 1873–1879		16 March 1856, Paris; Son of Napoleon III and Eugénie de Montijo	Never married	1 June 1879; Zulu Kingdom; Aged 23
Prince Napoléon-Jérôme Bonaparte (Napoleon V); 1879–1891 (disputed)		9 September 1822, Trieste; Son of Jérôme, King of Westphalia and Catharina of Württemberg	Princess Maria Clotilde of Savoy; 30 January 1859; 3 children	17 March 1891; Rome; Aged 68
Victor, Prince Napoléon (Napoleon V); 1879–1926 (disputed until 1891)		18 July 1862, Palais-Royal; Son of Prince Napoléon-Jérôme Bonaparte and Princess Maria Clotilde of Savoy	Princess Clémentine of Belgium; 10/14 November 1910; 2 children	3 May 1926; Brussels; Aged 63
Louis, Prince Napoléon (Napoleon VI); 1926–1997		23 January 1914, Brussels; Son of Victor, Prince Napoléon and Princess Clémentine of Belgium	Alix de Foresta; 16 August 1949; 4 children	3 May 1997; Prangins; Aged 83
Charles, Prince Napoléon (Napoleon VII); 1997–present (disputed)		19 October 1950, Boulogne-Billancourt; Son of Louis, Prince Napoléon and Alix, Princess Napoléon	Princess Béatrice of Bourbon-Two Sicilies; 19 December 1978; 2 children Jeanne-Françoise Valliccioni; 28 September 1996; 2 children (1 adopted)	
Jean-Christophe, Prince Napoléon (Napoleon VIII); 1997–present (disputed)		11 July 1986, Saint-Raphaël, Var; Son of Charles, Prince Napoléon and Princess Béatrice of Bourbon-Two Sicilies	Countess Olympia von und zu Arco-Zinneberg; 17 October 2019; 1 child	

== Marxism ==
In Marxist theory, the term "Bonapartism" was coined to describe the political trajectory of Napoleon III, the nephew of Napoleon I, who was known as Louis (Napoleon) Bonaparte before his coronation as Emperor. Karl Marx was a student of Jacobinism and the French Revolution, as well as a contemporary critic of the Second Republic and Second Empire. He used the term to refer to a situation in which counter-revolutionary military officers seize power from revolutionaries, and use selective reformism to co-opt the radicalism of the masses. In the process, Marx argued, Bonapartists preserve and mask the power of a narrower ruling class. He believed that both Napoleon I and Napoleon III had corrupted revolutions in France in this way. Marx offered this definition of and analysis of Bonapartism in The Eighteenth Brumaire of Louis Bonaparte, written in 1852. In this document, he drew attention to what he calls the phenomenon's repetitive history with one of his most quoted lines, typically condensed aphoristically as: "History repeats itself, first as tragedy, second as farce."

== See also ==
- Caesarism
- List of political systems in France
- Poujadism

== Bibliography ==
- Bluche, Frédéric (1980). Le bonapartisme: aux origines de la droite autoritaire (1800–1850). Nouvelles Editions Latines. ISBN 978-2723301046.
