= Alix, Princess Napoléon =

Alix
- Dowager Princess Napoléon
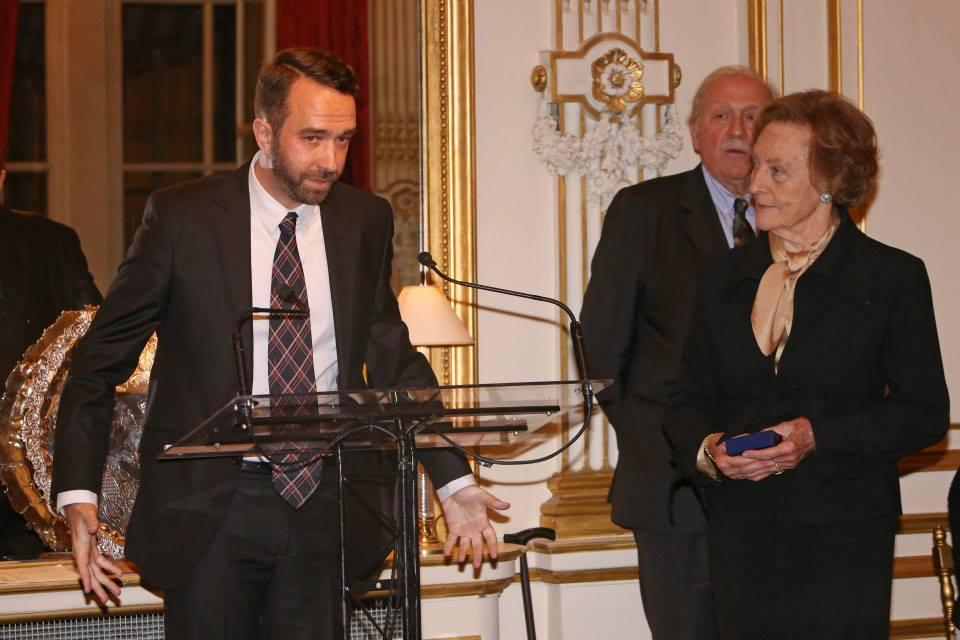
- Cérémonie du Prix d'histoire de la fondation Napoléon (2014)
- Born: 4 April 1926 (age 100)
- Spouse: Louis, Prince Napoléon (m. 1949; died 1997)
- Issue: Charles, Prince Napoléon; Princess Catherine; Princess Laure; Prince Jérôme
- House: Foresta
- Father: Marie Joseph Albéric, Count de Foresta
- Mother: Geneviève Yvonne Berthe Hélène Fredet

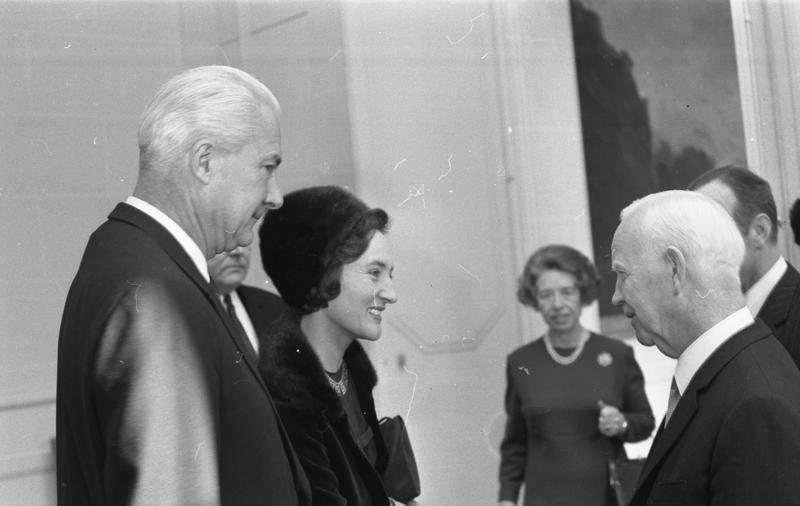
Prince Louis and Princess Alix Napoléon at a banquet in the German Embassy, Paris in 1968

Alix Marie Josèphe, Dowager Princess Napoléon (née de Foresta; born 4 April 1926) is the widow of Louis, Prince Napoléon, the disputed head of the House of Bonaparte and pretender to the Imperial throne of France from 1926 until his death in 1997. Consequently, the Bonapartist faction of French monarchists regarded her as "Empress of the French" for almost fifty years of the 20th century. Reaching her one hundredth birthday in April 2026, Alix is the longest-lived member of the Imperial family.

== Early life and ancestry ==
Born into an old French nobility, Alix Marie Josèphe was an elder daughter of Comte Marie Joseph Albéric de Foresta (1895–1987) and his wife, Geneviève Yvonne Berthe Hélène Fredet (1904–1994). Alix has one younger sister, Hedwige de Foresta (b. 1935), married to Hély, Marquis de La Roche-Aymon (1921–2003), whose mother, Princesse Madeleine de Broglie (1891–1984), was member of the ancient House of Broglie. Although Alix was the only consort of the surviving imperial line not born a princess, her family had been nobles in Lombardy since the 13th century, becoming counts palatine in 1330, constables of Venice in 1425, then retainers of an old House of Doria, at that time one of the most powerful families in the Republic of Genoa. They settled in Provence, France early in the 16th century, where they acquired twenty-two manors and the title of Marquis by 1651. The Forestas distinguished themselves during the French Restoration as courtiers loyal to the House of Bourbon, and to Henri, comte de Chambord, in particular Marie-Joseph de Foresta-Collongue (1783–1858), who was awarded with additional hereditary title of Marquis de la Roquette on 28 May 1821, with letters patent confirmed on 25 October 1821. Long established as squires of large estates and rice paddies in the Camargue, the Forestas often welcomed her son Charles and his siblings there while they were growing up.

== Biography ==
In 1961, about "200 girls from the United States and other countries" paraded "through the halls of the Palace of Versailles...to curtsey before Princess Alix Napoleon, wife of the great-grandnephew of Napoleon Bonaparte."

In 1976, she went to the Iranian Embassy for the Shah's birthday, being described at that time in the press as "one of the two most royal ladies of France -- Princess Napoleon Bonaparte, the elegant, lovely-looking Alix..."

She was an honorary member of the Napoleonic Society of America (1983–2006), which later merged with the Napoleonic Alliance to form the Napoleonic Historical Society in 2006. More recently, she also gave Havana's Napoleonic Museum "part of a porcelain dinner service presented by Napoleon Bonaparte to his brother Jerome on his wedding day."

On 4 April 2026, Princess Alix celebrated her 100th birthday.

== Marriage and issue ==
Arms of alliance of Princess Napoléon

Louis, Prince Napoléon married Alix de Foresta on 16 August 1949 at Linières-Bouton, France. They had four children:

- Prince Charles Marie Jérôme Victor (b. 19 October 1950) who claims headship of the House of Bonaparte and the title, "Le Prince Napoléon".
- Princess Catherine Elisabeth Albérique Marie (b. 19 October 1950), who married firstly on 4 June 1974, Nicolò San Martino d'Agliè dei marchesi di Fontaneto e San Germano (b. 3 July 1948) in Prangins, Switzerland, and divorced in 1982 without issue. She married secondly on 22 October 1982, Jean-Claude Dualé (3 November 1936 in Medjez-el-Bab, Tunisia – 2017) in Paris, France, and had two daughters:
  - Charlotte Laure Laëtitia Dualé (b. 13 October 1982)
  - Marion Josée Alix Dualé (b. 29 March 1985)
- Princess Laure Clémentine Geneviève Bonaparte (b. 8 October 1952 in Paris) married on 23 December 1982, Jean-Claude Lecomte (15 March 1948 in Ax-les-Thermes, France – 2009) and had a son:
  - Clément Louis Lecomte (b. 7 July 1995)
- Prince Jérôme Xavier Marie Joseph Victor (b. 14 January 1957) married on 2 September 2013, Licia Innocenti (b. 27 April 1965 in Baden, Aargau, Switzerland)

Alix, Princess Napoléon House of Foresta Born: 4 April 1926
Titles in pretence
| Vacant Title last held by Clémentine of Belgium | — TITULAR — Empress of the French; 16 August 1949 – 3 May 1997; Reason for succession failure: Empire replaced by Republic | Succeeded by Jeanne-Françoise Valliccioni |
