= Imperial Chapel of Ajaccio =

Roman Catholic chapel in Ajaccio, Corsica, built 1857–1859 in Neo-Renaissance style

Coordinates: 41°55′18″N 8°44′19″E

Imperial Chapel
- Chapelle Impériale
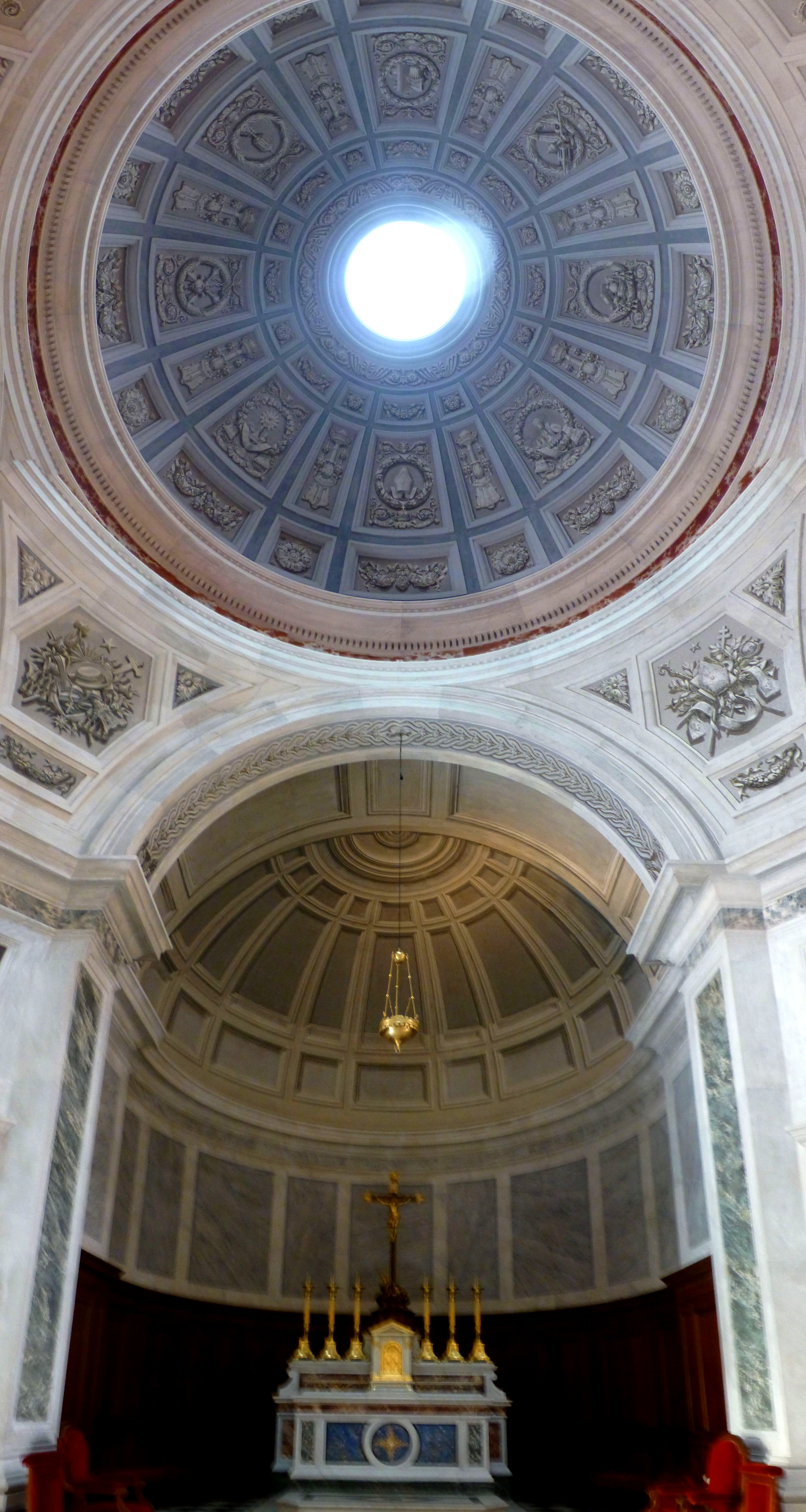
- The interior of the Imperial Chapel in Ajaccio
- Imperial Chapel
- Location: Ajaccio, Corsica, France
- Address: 50-54 Rue Cardinal Fesch, 20000 Ajaccio, France
- Denomination: Catholic

History
- Status: Chapel
- Consecrated: 9 September 1860

Architecture
- Architect: Alexis Paccard
- Style: Neo-Renaissance
- Completed: 1859

Specifications
- Materials: Stone, marble

Administration
- Diocese: Diocese of Ajaccio

The Imperial Chapel (French: La Chapelle Impériale), also known as the Palatine Chapel, is a Roman Catholic chapel in Ajaccio, Corsica, France.

Commissioned by Napoleon III and built between 1857 and 1859, it was designed by Alexis Paccard in the Neo-Renaissance style to honour the last wishes of Cardinal Joseph Fesch. It serves as the final resting place of several members of the Bonaparte family, including Napoleon I's mother, Letizia Bonaparte. The chapel is part of the Palais Fesch complex, home to the Fesch Museum, and was designated a Monument historique in 1924.

== History ==
Before the construction of the Imperial Chapel, members of the Bonaparte family were buried in the crypt of Ajaccio Cathedral. Cardinal Joseph Fesch, maternal uncle of Napoleon I, expressed a desire to be buried in a separate chapel alongside his sister Letizia (Napoleon's mother) and any other members of the Bonaparte family who wished to be interred there. Fesch died in 1839, his final request was not fulfilled until nearly two decades later. In 1857, Napoleon III ordered the construction of the chapel to honour his great-uncle's wishes.

Construction was completed in two years, and the chapel was consecrated on 9 September 1860 in the presence of Napoleon III and Empress Eugénie. It stands within the right wing of the Palais Fesch, where Cardinal Fesch's extensive collection of European paintings is housed.

On 22 July 1924, the Imperial Chapel was designated a Monument historique by the French Ministry of Culture. In October 2021, as part of the Bicentenary of the death of Napoleon I, the site was opened to the public for guided tours.

== Architecture ==
Designed in the Neo-Renaissance style by Alexis Paccard, an architect who worked on several projects related to Napoleon I and oversaw the restoration of Napoleon's ancestral home, the Casa Bonaparte. Paccard also worked on other buildings associated with Napoleon, including renovations at the Chateau of Fontainebleau and Rambouillet. Designed in the Neo-Renaissance style, the Imperial Chapel follows a Latin cross layout and is built from local Saint-Florent stone. Its façade features rounded arches and sculptural detailing, while the interior is adorned with marble.

The chapel's interior is notable for its ornamental paintings by Jérôme Maglioli, a large cupola in the shape of an amphitheatre, and stained glass windows decorated with the coat of arms of Cardinal Fesch. A distinctive feature is the Ankh cross displayed above the altar, said to have been brought back by Napoleon from his Egyptian campaign, as a present to his mother.

== Inscription ==
Above the entrance, a marble plaque bears a Latin dedication to Maria Letizia Bonaparte and Cardinal Joseph Fesch, concluding with a prayer for eternal rest in Christ.

MARIAE LAETITIAE IMP. NEAPOLEONIS MATRI ET IOS. FESCH S.R.E. CARDINALI

QUI VIVUS SIBI ET SORORI OPTIMAE ET SUIS HOC SEPULCRALE SACELLUM INSTITUIT
AUSPICIIS NEAPOLEONIS III PERFECTUM EST A.D. MDCCCLIX

AETERNAM IN CHRISTO REQUIEM

— Sur les traces de Napoléon.

The inscription translates as:

To Maria Letizia, mother of Emperor Napoleon I, and to Joseph Fesch, Cardinal of the Holy Roman Church, who in his lifetime founded this sepulchral chapel for himself, his beloved sister, and his family. Completed under the auspices of Napoleon III in the year 1859.

Eternal rest in Christ.

— Sur les traces de Napoléon.

== Burials ==
The circular crypt located under the Dome houses the remains of several Bonaparte family:

- Carlo Buonaparte (1746–1785), father of Napoleon I (reinterred 1951)
- Letizia Bonaparte (1750–1836), Napoleon I's mother
- Cardinal Joseph Fesch (1763–1839), maternal uncle of Napoleon I
- Charles Lucien Bonaparte (1803–1857)
- Zénaïde Bonaparte (1860–1862)
- Louis Lucien Bonaparte (1813–1891)
- Napoléon-Charles Bonaparte (1839–1899)
- Louis, Prince Napoléon (1914–1997)

On either side of the crypt, in the access staircase, are buried Clémentine of Belgium (1872–1955) and her husband Victor Napoleon (1862–1926).

== Heritage Status ==
The chapel was designated a Monument historique of France on 22 July 1924. It remains a significant site of Napoleonic memory and is open to the public as part of the Palais Fesch complex, which also includes the Fesch Museum.

== Gallery ==
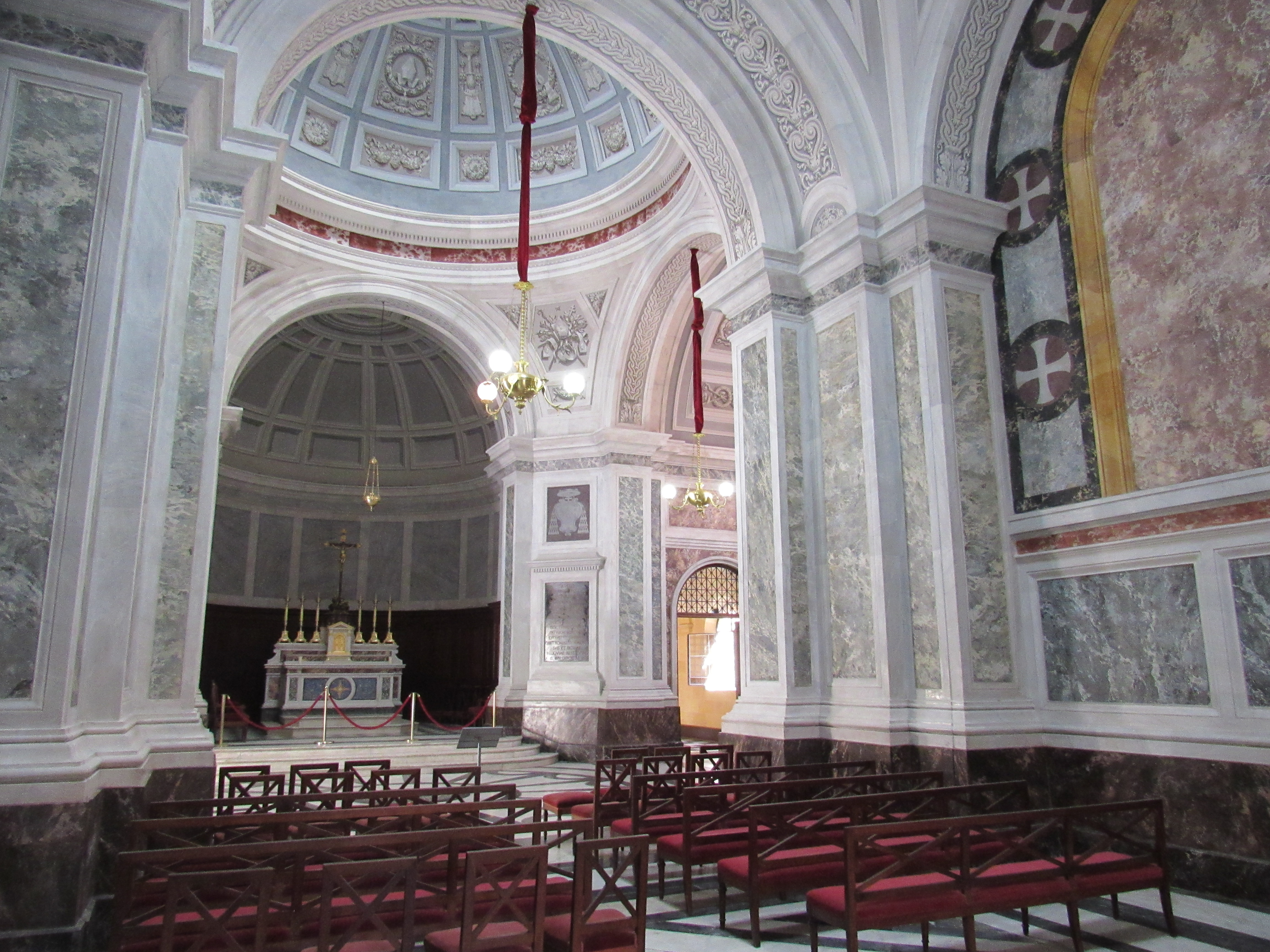
View of the nave and altar

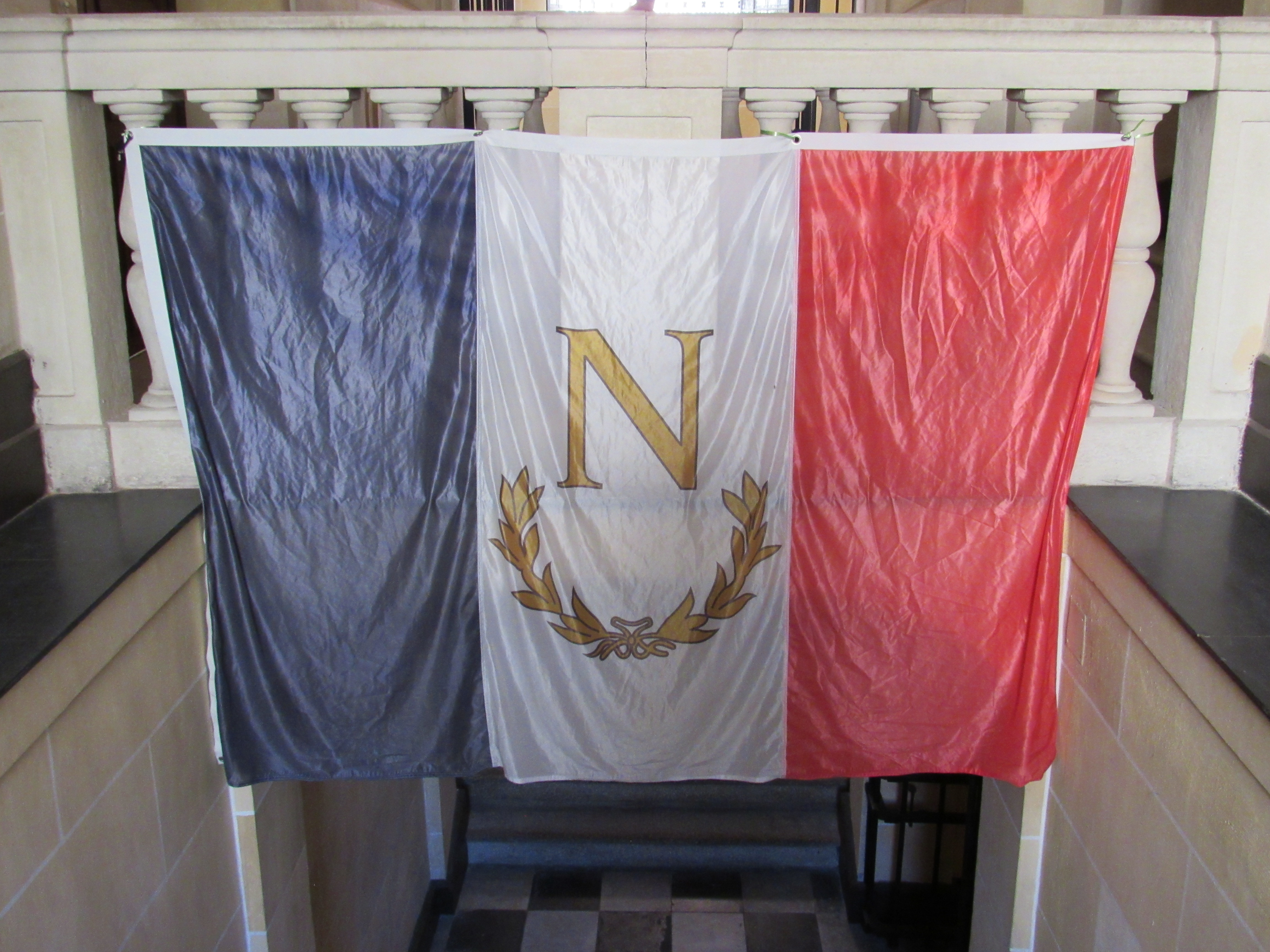
Entrance to the Bonaparte family crypt

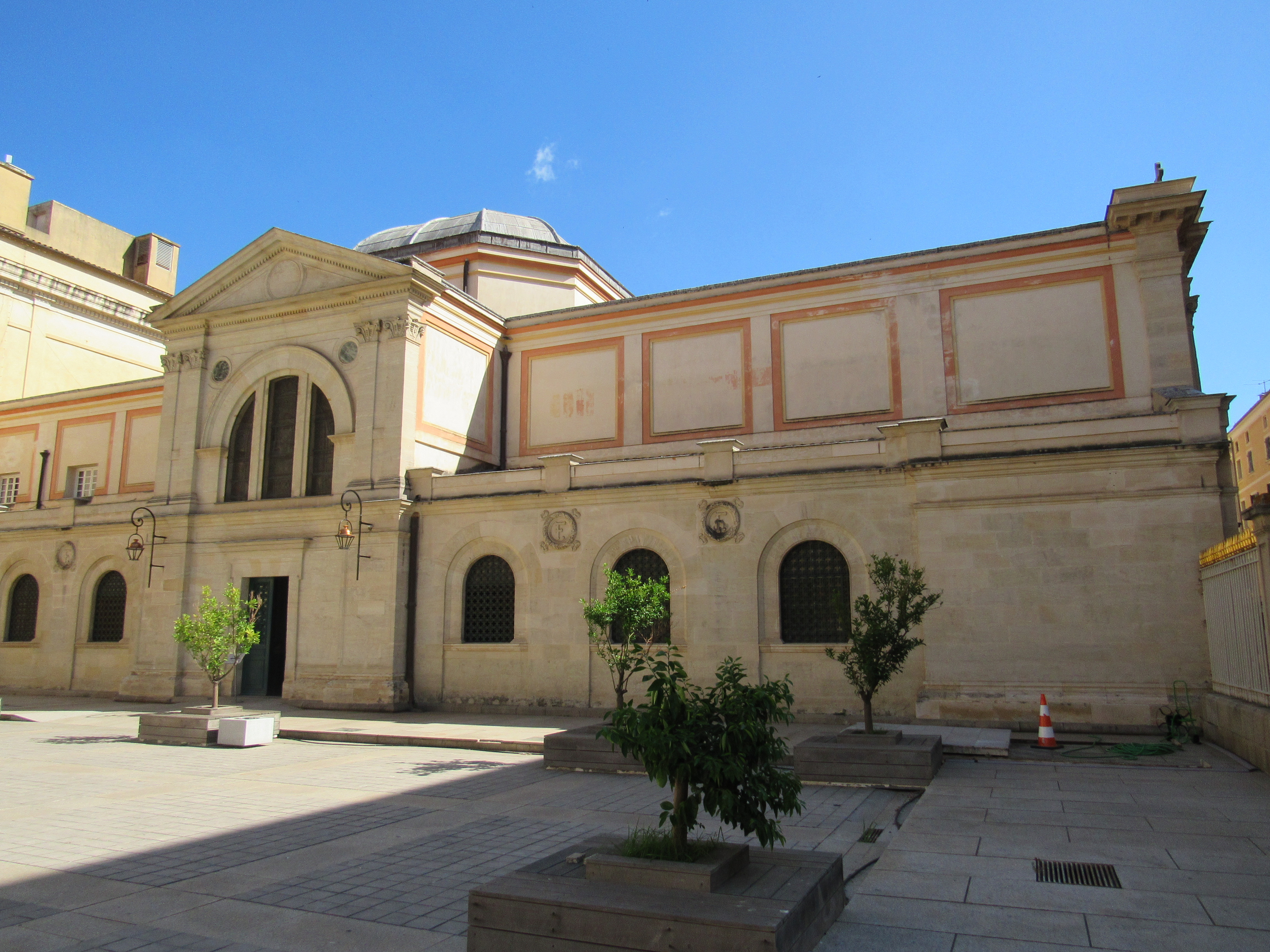
Exterior façade of the chapel in Ajaccio

== See also ==
- Ajaccio
- House of Bonaparte
- Les Invalides
