= Jean-Christophe, Prince Napoléon =

Head of the former Imperial House of France (born 1986)

Jean-Christophe
- Prince Napoléon; Prince of Montfort
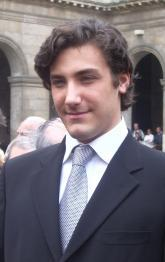
- Prince Jean-Christophe in 2006

Head of the House of Bonaparte (disputed)
- Tenure: 3 May 1997 – present
- Predecessor: Louis, Prince Napoléon
- Heir Apparent: Prince Louis Napoléon
- Born: 11 July 1986 (age 40); Saint-Raphaël, Var, France
- Spouse: Countess Olympia von und zu Arco-Zinneberg (m. 2019)
- Issue: Prince Louis Napoléon; Prince Ferdinand Napoléon
Names
- Jean-Christophe Louis Ferdinand Albéric Napoléon de Bonaparte
- House: Bonaparte
- Father: Prince Charles Napoléon
- Mother: Princess Béatrice of Bourbon-Two Sicilies
- Education: HEC Paris; Harvard Business School

Jean-Christophe, Prince Napoléon, Prince of Montfort (born Jean-Christophe Louis Ferdinand Albéric Napoléon de Bonaparte; 11 July 1986), is a French businessman and the disputed head of the Imperial House of France, and as such the heir of Napoleon Bonaparte, the first Emperor of the French. He would be known as Napoleon VIII.

A graduate of HEC Paris and Harvard Business School, he pursued a career in private equity, gaining experience at Morgan Stanley and Blackstone in both New York City and London. Later, he founded Leon Capital, a private equity investment firm.

== Family background ==
Jean-Christophe was born on 11 July 1986 in Saint-Raphaël, Var, France. He is the son of Charles, Prince Napoléon and his first wife Princess Béatrice of Bourbon-Two Sicilies, daughter of the late Prince Ferdinand of Bourbon, Duke of Castro, a claimant to headship of the former Royal House of the Two Sicilies. His parents divorced on 2 May 1989, two months before his third birthday.

Jean-Christophe is the great-great-great-grandnephew of Emperor Napoleon I (who has no legitimate living direct descendants) through the emperor's youngest brother, Jérôme, King of Westphalia. Through his mother, he is a descendant of King Louis XIV of France and through his great-grandmother, Princess Clémentine of Belgium, he descends from Leopold II of Belgium, William IV, Prince of Orange, Charles III of Spain, Frederick William I of Prussia, George II of Great Britain, Victor Emmanuel II, the first King of Italy, and Louis Philippe I, King of the French, who was the last king to rule France, while his great-great-grandfather was Prince Napoléon Bonaparte, the cousin of the Emperor Napoleon III, France's most recent monarch.

== Prince Napoléon ==
Jean-Christophe's grandfather, Louis, Prince Napoléon, died in 1997 and stipulated in his will that he wished his 11-year-old grandson Jean-Christophe to succeed him as Head of the Imperial House of France rather than the boy's father, Charles, who had embraced republican principles and decided to remarry without his father's consent. Despite the dynastic dispute, Jean-Christophe's father has stated that "there will never be conflict" between him and his son over the imperial succession.

== Education and career ==
Jean-Christophe studied at Lycée Saint-Dominique in Neuilly-sur-Seine from 2001 to 2004, obtaining a baccalauréat with honours in the sciences and mathematics. From 2004 to 2006, he studied economics and mathematics at the Institut Privé de Préparation aux Études Supérieures in Paris. Then he enrolled at the HEC Paris, graduating in 2011 with an MSc in management.

He completed an MBA at Harvard Business School in May 2017. He worked from 2017 until 2022 as a private equity associate at the Blackstone Group in London. In April 2022 he founded a private equity boutique Leon Capital LLP.

He has lived and worked in New York City as an investment banking analyst for Morgan Stanley and in London as a private equity associate for Advent International. He is fluent in French, English, and Spanish. He represents his dynasty's heritage at public events and ceremonies in France and elsewhere in Europe.

== Personal life ==
On 17 October 2019, Jean-Christophe contracted a civil marriage with Countess Olympia von und zu Arco-Zinneberg, a great-granddaughter of Charles I of Austria, and a member by birth of the ancient House of Arco, at Neuilly-sur-Seine. On 19 October 2019, the couple had a religious marriage officiated by Antoine de Romanet, Bishop of the French Armed Forces, at the Cathedral of Saint-Louis des Invalides in Paris. The wedding ball took place at the Palace of Fontainebleau.

Jean-Christophe and Olympia have two sons, Prince Louis Charles Riprand Victor Jérôme Marie Napoléon, born on 7 December 2022 in Paris, and Prince Ferdinand Napoléon, born on 3 August 2026 in Paris.

== Honours ==
=== Foreign ===
- House of Bourbon-Two Sicilies: Deputy President Bailiff Knight Grand Cross with Collar of Justice of the Two Sicilian Sacred Military Constantinian Order of Saint George

=== Awards ===
- United Kingdom: Freeman of the City of London

Jean-Christophe, Prince Napoléon House of Bonaparte Born: 11 July 1986
Titles in pretence
Preceded by Napoléon VI Louis	— TITULAR — Emperor of the French; 3 May 1997 – present Reason for succession failure: Empire abolished in 1870	Incumbent; Heir: Prince Louis Napoléon
