= Charles, Prince Napoléon =

French politician (born 1950)

Charles
- Prince Napoléon
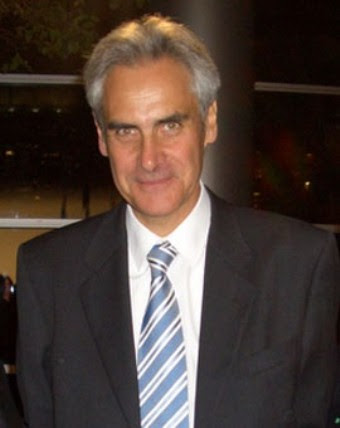
- Charles in 2008

Head of the House of Bonaparte (disputed)
- Period: 3 May 1997 – present
- Predecessor: Louis, Prince Napoléon
- Heir apparent: Prince Jean-Christophe Napoléon
- Born: 19 October 1950 (age 76); Boulogne-Billancourt, France
- Spouse: Princess Béatrice of Bourbon-Two Sicilies (m. 1978; div. 1989) Jeanne-Françoise Valliccioni (m. 1996)
- Issue: Princess Caroline Napoléon; Prince Jean-Christophe Napoléon; Princess Sophie Napoléon; Princess Anh Napoléon
Names
- Charles Marie Jérôme Victor Napoléon
- House: Bonaparte
- Father: Louis, Prince Napoléon
- Mother: Alix de Foresta

Member of the Nemours Municipal Council
- In office 21 March 2008 – 3 December 2008

Deputy Mayor of Ajaccio
- In office 25 March 2001 – 16 March 2008
- Mayor: Simon Renucci

Personal details
- Other political affiliations: PS; DVG; MoDem (2007–2008)

Charles, Prince Napoléon (born Charles Marie Jérôme Victor Napoléon; 19 October 1950) is a French politician who is the disputed head of the Imperial House of France and, as such, heir to the legacy of his great-great-granduncle, Emperor Napoléon I.

Other Bonapartists consider his son, Jean-Christophe, to be the current head of the house and heir. Charles would be known as Napoleon VII.

== Family background ==
Charles is the elder son of Louis, Prince Napoléon (1914–1997), and as such a great-great-grandson in the male line of Jérôme Bonaparte, King of Westphalia, Napoléon's youngest brother. As neither Napoléon I nor Napoléon III of France has surviving legitimate issue in the male line, Jérôme's descendants constitute the only Imperial Bonapartes still living. (The American Bonapartes were senior in descent from King Jérôme, but the last male of that line died in 1945, and the branch was never considered dynastic in France).

In 2011, a study of DNA extracted from Napoléon I’s remains and compared to that of Charles was found to match substantially, which established that Charles was a member of the male line of the Imperial House of Bonaparte. (In 2013, published scholarship comparing DNA haplotype evidence taken from Emperor Napoléon I; Charles; and a descendant of Napoléon's reputed son, Count Alexandre Colonna-Walewski, verified Walewski's descent in the genetic male line from Napoléon's patriline, but Walewski's mother was never married to the emperor and Alexandre was raised as the legal son of her husband.)

Charles' mother is Alix de Foresta (born 4 April 1926), daughter of Albéric, comte de Foresta. Although she was the only consort of the surviving Imperial line not born a princess, her family had been nobles in Lombardy since the 13th century, becoming counts palatine in 1330, constables of Venice in 1425, then retainers of the powerful Doria family in Genoa. They settled in Provence, France early in the 16th century, where they acquired twenty-two manors and the title of marquis by 1651. Ironically, the Forestas distinguished themselves during the French Restoration as courtiers loyal to the House of Bourbon, and to Henri, comte de Chambord in particular. Long established as squires of large estates and rice paddies in the Camargue, the Forestas often welcomed Charles and his siblings there while they were growing up.

Charles was born in Boulogne-Billancourt, France, along with his twin sister, Princess Catherine. He was baptised at Saint-Louis-des-Invalides by the Apostolic nuncio to France Archbishop Angelo Roncalli (later Pope John XXIII). Charles spent much of his youth at the family's ancestral retreat-in-exile, the Villa Prangins on Lake Geneva between Lausanne and Geneva in Switzerland. He has two younger siblings, Princess Laure (born 1952) and Prince Jérôme (born 1957). His sisters are married but the French imperial line of succession never descended to or through women, while his brother married at the age of 56 and has no issue.

== Education and profession ==
Charles attended school at Sainte-croix-des-neiges in Abondance, Haute-Savoie, taking off 1964–1965 to study German in the Black Forest. He holds a doctorate in economics from the Sorbonne. He has written essays and books, including "History of Urban Transportation" (Histoire des Transports Urbains, Dunod-Bordas), "Bonaparte and Paoli" (Bonaparte et Paoli, Plon-Perrin, 2000), "The Bonapartes, Rebels at Heart" (Les Bonaparte, des esprits rebelles, Plon-Perrin, 2006), and "For a New Republic" (Pour une nouvelle République, to be published by Pharos, 2007). He makes frequent public appearances in support of his political beliefs and candidacies.

Charles has worked professionally as a banker, financial planner, and real estate developer and as a visiting professor at the American Institute on Foreign Policy.

== Marriage and children ==
On 19 December 1978, Charles married his distant cousin, Princess Béatrice of Bourbon-Two Sicilies, daughter of Prince Ferdinand, Duke of Castro, a pretender to the throne of the Two Sicilies.

They had two children:

- Princess Caroline Bonaparte (born 24 October 1980) married religiously at Neuilly on 27 June 2009 and civilly at Castellabate nel Cilento on 19 September 2009 Eric Alain Marie Quérénet-Onfroy de Bréville (born 28 June 1971), son of François Quérénet-Onfroy de Bréville and Christiane Vincent de Vaugelas:
  - Elvire Quérénet-Onfroy de Breville (born 8 August 2010)
  - Augustin Quérénet-Onfroy de Breville (born 12 February 2013)
- Jean-Christophe, Prince Napoléon or Prince Impérial (born 11 July 1986), married Countess Olympia von und zu Arco-Zinneberg on 19 October 2019 in Paris.
  - Prince Louis Bonaparte (born 7 December 2022)

Charles and Béatrice were divorced on 2 May 1989.

On 28 September 1996, Charles was married in a civil ceremony to Jeanne-Françoise Valliccioni (born in Ortiporio, Corsica on 26 March 1958). She had previously married Erik Langrais on 15 July 1978 at Casaglione, Corsica, from whom she was divorced on 24 July 1990. When Charles and Jeanne-Françoise were married, they already had a daughter:

- Princess Sophie Catherine Bonaparte (born in Paris, 18 April 1992).

In 1998, the couple adopted a daughter of Vietnamese extraction:

- Princess Anh Bonaparte (born in Ho Chi Minh City on 22 April 1998).

== Dynastic dispute ==
Although officially recognized as heir apparent to the Bonapartist claim during the lifetime of his father Prince Louis Napoléon, when the latter's will was made public on 2 December 1997 (seven months after his death), it declared that Charles was to be bypassed as dynastic heir in favour of his only son, Prince Jean-Christophe Napoléon, then 11 years old.

In an interview published by Le Figaro on 2 December 1997, Jean-Marc Varaut, the attorney who witnessed the late Prince Louis Napoléon's will and subsequently represented the dynastic interests of Prince Jean Christophe against his father, stated that Charles had alienated himself from the Bonaparte legacy by publicly espousing "republican and democratic opinions.... He has deprived himself of all rights to dynastic heritage in remarrying without his father's permission... which is against the rules of the imperial family."

In his will, Louis cited three sources for his authority to exclude his son as dynastic heir:

- The Senatus Consultus of 7 November 1852 (an amendment to the Second Empire constitution): It states, in relevant part, "Article 3 Louis Napoleon Bonaparte, if he has no male children, may adopt the legitimate children and descendants in the male line of the brothers of Emperor Napoleon I... his adopted sons may only be called upon to succeed him after his legitimate descendants. Adoption is forbidden to Louis Napoleon's successors and to their descendants.... Article 4 Louis Napoleon Bonaparte shall determine, by an organic decree addressed to the Senate and deposited in its archives, the order of succession to the throne within the Bonaparte family, in case there remains no direct heir, legitimate or adopted.... The members of the family of Louis Napoleon Bonaparte eligible for the succession, and their descendants of both sexes, are members of the Imperial family.... They may not marry without the Emperor's authorization. Their marriage without such authorization entails loss of all rights of succession, both for him who contracts the marriage and his descendants. Nevertheless, if there are no children of the marriage and it is dissolved by death, the prince who contracted the marriage shall recover his succession rights."
- The Imperial Family Statute of 21 June 1853: It substantially reinstated the house law adopted under Napoleon I on 30 March 1806, which provided: that marriages of dynasts required the prior, written consent of the emperor de jure, or were void; that divorce was forbidden for members of the Imperial family; and that the emperor de jure retained the right to supervise and discipline members of the dynasty, including (under Title IV) the right to arrest, shun, or banish a dynast who "engages in misbehavior and forgets his dignity or duties" for up to one year.
- Dynastic tradition: Among the Bonapartes this includes legal changes in the succession order during the first and second empires, and post-monarchy attempts to change heirs by testament. Napoleon I quarreled openly with some of his brothers, particularly over their marriages, and dethroned or de-dynasticized them. When Napoleon III's only son, the Prince Imperial Louis Napoléon, died in 1879, his will purported to exclude his cousin and genealogical heir, Prince Napoléon Joseph, from headship of the deposed dynasty due to political differences, in favor of his elder son, Prince Victor Napoléon. Although almost all Bonapartists therefore recognized his son, Napoléon Joseph insisted that his dynastic claim remained intact. Yet as Imperial pretender he likewise disavowed his heir, writing in his will, "I leave nothing to Victor, my elder son. He is a traitor and a rebel.... I recommend to my son Louis to remain faithful to my political and religious opinions. They are in the true tradition of my uncle Napoleon I. I hope that Louis will be the representative of the cause of the Napoleons. His aim must be to organize French democracy."

Charles has expressed skepticism that his father's genuine intention was to disinherit him dynastically, "Without doubt, he had a mood swing, exploited by conservative elements in his entourage with whom I have long clashed.... I am fighting so that my family ceases to be the victim of attempted manipulation." Moreover, Charles denies that his father had the authority, by law or tradition, to exclude him from the order of succession:

"Even if I accept their premise, referring me to the Senatus Consultus of Napoleon III, divorce did not exist under the Second Empire, so it cannot be taken into account for the succession.... Moreover, the hypocrisy of this argument is exposed by the dates: My father's will was written in May 1996. I only re-married in October. All that matters is the Bonaparte tradition, which makes the eldest son the natural heir of his father."

Aside from his second marriage, Varaut alleged that Louis was offended that his son unilaterally had French civil authorities change their surname from "Napoléon-Bonaparte" to "Napoléon" during his divorce in 1989. But Charles maintains that the family's legal surname had, in fact, been Napoléon until altered through clerical error on his birth certificate. When Charles requested that his surname be corrected, the civil authorities proceeded to apply the same change to the father's surname, "but not at my initiative."

Varaut further drew attention to the fact that Charles was warned in advance by his father that he would be purged from the succession, and that he had responded to his father with a letter dated 16 June 1996 in which he asserted that his "republican" beliefs had already alienated him from the principles of the Imperial position, even before his father's decision to exclude him.

When queried by the French royalty magazine, Point de Vue, as to why he claimed headship of the Imperial dynasty in view of his republican pretensions, Charles replied, "I assume the 'moral heritage' of my name. To renounce today to my ability to become the head of our House would imply that I accept a certain number of grievances of which I have been accused...I cannot accept this sentence from another era. As for my republican sentiments, those who reproach me misunderstand the history of our family. Bonaparte – General, then First Consul – defended the Republic."

In fact, the former heads of the House of Bonaparte, Napoleon I and his nephew Napoleon III, had been Republican leaders, respectively, First Consul of France and President of the French Republic, before they proclaimed themselves emperors.

Charles and his son have not engaged in the public feuding for which some of the past Bonaparte pretenders and their heirs have been notorious, and the father has stated of his son that "there will never be conflict between us". A pre-screening of Un nom en héritage, a documentary television series on France's former dynasties, was the subject of a two-page spread in a December 2006 issue of Point de Vue that pictured Charles side by side with Jean-Christophe, both shown as participating in a cordial meeting between Napoleonic and Orléanist pretenders.

Nonetheless, in November 2004 an issue of Point de Vue had announced that henceforth the magazine would accord the Bonapartist title of pretence, "the Prince Napoleon", to Jean-Christophe, whereas since 1997 that title had been attributed to Charles. This decision followed receipt by the magazine of a protest from Jean-Marc Varaut, prompted by publication in an earlier issue of a reference to Charles as "head of the Imperial house". Point de Vue, which sometimes gazettes monarchist announcements, published Varaut's re-assertion of the dynastic exclusion of Charles along with the prince's response: "...the title of 'head of family' among the Bonapartes devolves, at the death of the father, upon his eldest son. That rule is not susceptible to modification by the titleholder, a fortiori when the motives involved are petty and contrary to the Civil Code. I have the honour of bearing this charge since the death of my father, and my son will assume it in turn upon my death."

== Political career ==
In 2001, Charles moved to Corsica to run in Ajaccio's municipal elections. He joined a left-wing coalition which won an upset victory, and served as second deputy mayor, being responsible for the city's tourism industry.

In early 2008, Charles announced plans to stand for election in March 2008 as mayor of Nemours, where he led a union list called "Ensemble Pour Les Nemouriens" with local personalities, such as Ginette Tardy. In the election, he was defeated by Valérie Lacroute.

== References and notes ==
- Opfell, Olga S. "H.I.H. Charles, Prince Napoleon Imperial House of France (House of Bonaparte)," Royalty Who Waits: The 21 Heads of Formerly Regnant Houses of Europe. Jefferson: McFarland & Company, Inc., Publishers, 2001. 51–61.

Charles, Prince Napoléon Bonaparte Born: 19 October 1950
Titles in pretence
Preceded by Napoléon VI Louis	— TITULAR — Emperor of the French; 3 May 1997–present Reason for succession failure: Empire abolished in 1870	Incumbent; Heir: Jean-Christophe, Prince Napoléon
Preceded by Napoléon VI Louis	— TITULAR — King of Westphalia; 3 May 1997–present Reason for succession failure: Kingdom dissolved in 1813	Incumbent; Heir: Jean-Christophe, Prince Napoléon
