= Belvédère Château =

Belgian royal residence in Brussels

- Château du Belvédère (French); Kasteel Belvédère (Dutch); Schloss Belvédère (German)
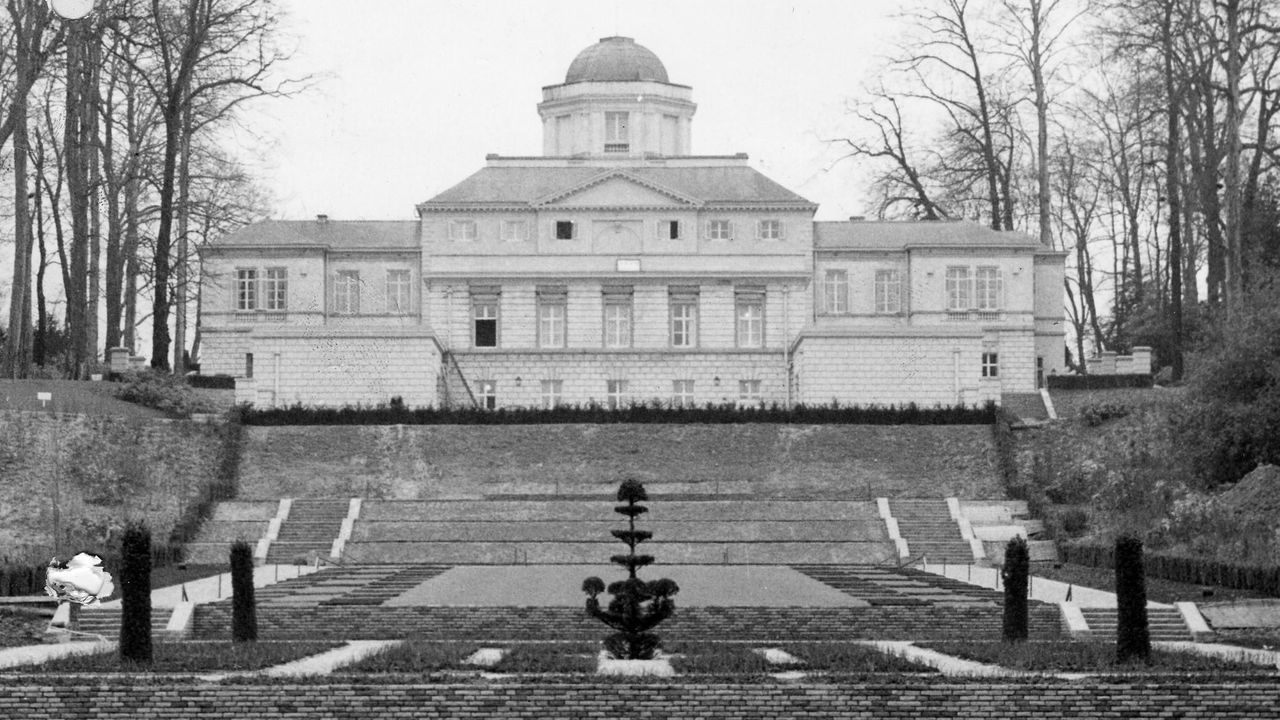
- View of the Belvédère Château
- Interactive map of the Belvédère Château area

General information
- Type: Château
- Architectural style: Neoclassical
- Location: 1020 Laeken, City of Brussels, Brussels-Capital Region, Belgium
- Coordinates: 50°53′29″N 4°21′17″E

The Belvédère Château (French: Château du Belvédère; Dutch: Kasteel Belvédère; German: Schloss Belvédère) is a residence of the Belgian royal family in Laeken, in the north-west of the City of Brussels, which currently houses King Albert II and his wife, Queen Paola. It is near the Royal Palace of Laeken, the official residence of the King and Queen of the Belgians. Another nearby residence, the Villa Schonenberg, is home to Princess Astrid, the sister of the current king, Philippe.

== History ==
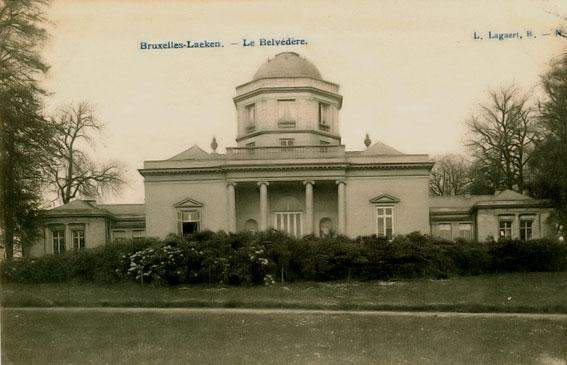
The Belvédère Château, c. 1900

The Belvédère Château was originally built in the 1780s, then was bought by King Leopold II in 1867. The château was meant for his sister, Carlotta of Mexico, but she chose to live in the suburb of Tervuren, just outside Brussels, which left Belvédère empty for a while.

In 1890, a fire broke out in the Royal Palace of Laeken, and Leopold II and his wife Marie Henriette of Austria moved into Belvédère while repairs took place. Once the repairs were finished, Leopold and Marie Henriette moved back into the Royal Palace, while Belvédère became the residence of their youngest daughter, Princess Clementine. She lived there until her father died and she got married, leaving the château for the Royal Palace. After that, the château was occupied by different members of the royal court.

In 1958, Belvédère was used for exhibitions during the Brussels World's Fair (Expo 58). The following year, the newlyweds Prince Albert of Liège and Paola Ruffo di Calabria moved into the château, which expanded to 5 hectares (12 acres), having acquired parts of a local park. All three of the royal couple's children were born and raised in Belvédère. After the couple became the Belgian monarchs in 1993, they preferred to remain living in the château instead of moving into the Royal Palace.

== See also ==
- List of castles and châteaux in Belgium
- Royal Trust (Belgium)
- Neoclassical architecture in Belgium
- History of Brussels
- Culture of Belgium
- Belgium in the long nineteenth century
