= Emperor of the French =

Title of the French monarchs from Napoleon I to Napoleon III

- Empereur des Français
- Imperial
- Imperial coat of arms

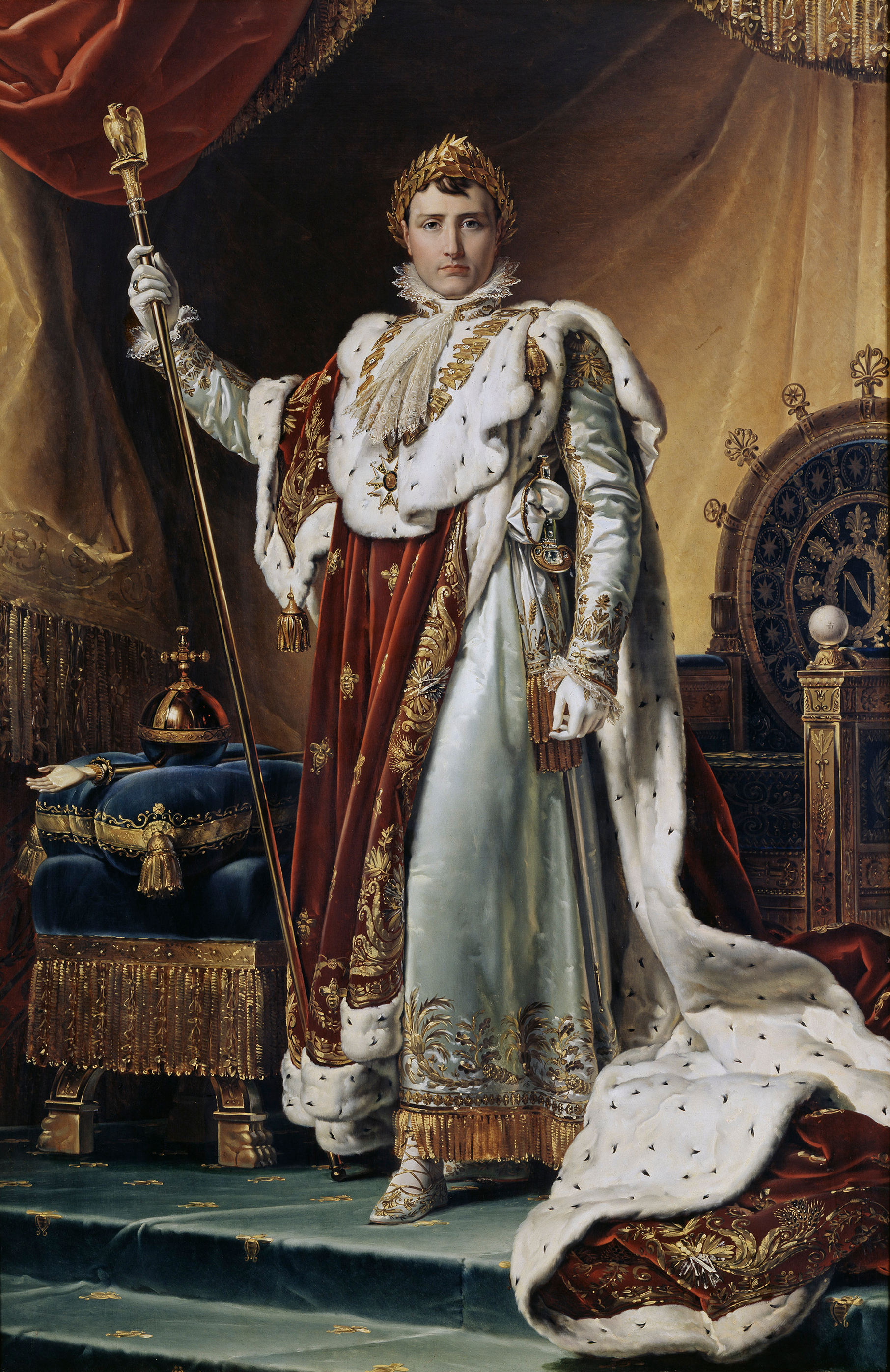
- First to Reign; Napoleon I 18 May 1804 – 22 June 1815

Details
- Style: His Imperial Majesty
- First monarch: Napoleon I
- Last monarch: Napoleon III
- Formed: 18 May 1804; 2 December 1852
- Residences: Tuileries Palace, Elysée-Napoléon, Paris
- Pretender: Jean-Christophe Napoléon

Emperor of the French (French: Empereur des Français) was the title of the monarch of the First French Empire and the Second French Empire. The title emphasized sovereignty vested in the French people rather than in the territory of France. The powers of the emperor differed between the two empires and changed over time, ranging from extensive personal authority to a constitutional, executive role.

== Details ==
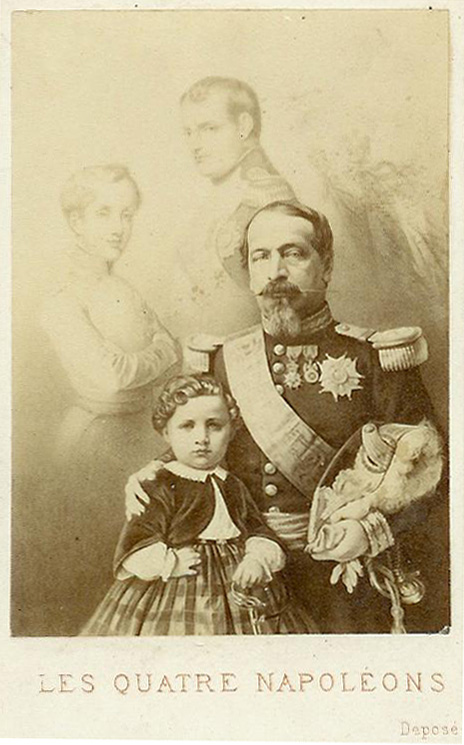
"The Four Napoleons", 1858 image depicting Napoleon I, Napoleon II, Napoleon III, and Louis-Napoléon

After rising to power by the Coup of 18 Brumaire in 1799 and ending the French Revolution, Napoleon Bonaparte was proclaimed Emperor on 18 May 1804 by the Senate. He crowned himself as Emperor of the French on 2 December 1804 at the cathedral of Notre-Dame de Paris, with the Crown of Napoleon.

The title of "Emperor of the French" was supposed to demonstrate that Napoleon's coronation was not a restoration of the monarchy, but an introduction of a new political system: the French Empire. The title emphasized that the emperor governed over "the French people" (the nation) with their consent, did not rule over France (the state), and was an office under the French Republic similar to the previous office of First Consul. The old formula of "King of France" indicated that the king owned France as a personal possession. The new term indicated a constitutional monarchy. The title was purposely created to preserve the appearance of the French Republic and to show that after the French Revolution, the feudal system was abandoned and a nation state was created, with equal citizens governed by their emperor. "Emperor" also harkened back to the Roman Republic title of Imperator, as a magistrate who exercised Imperium or command, especially over an army. This emphasized Napoleon as Chief Magistrate and Commander-in-Chief elected by the citizens.

The creation and taking of the high title "emperor" also emphasized that the will of the citizens of France was equal in sovereignty to anyone's, especially to what had been until this time the highest sovereignty in the Western world: the (Holy) Roman Emperor, who claimed continuity with the ancient Roman Emperors, and whose coronation by the Pope was used to claim authority by divine right.

It was only after 1 January 1809 that the state was officially referred to as the French Empire and not the French Republic.

Napoleon I's reign lasted until 22 June 1815, when he was defeated at the Battle of Waterloo, exiled, and imprisoned on the island of Saint Helena, where he died on 5 May 1821. His reign was interrupted by the Bourbon Restoration of 1814 and his exile to Elba, from which he escaped less than a year later to reclaim the throne, reigning as Emperor for another 111 days before his final defeat and exile.

The second period of empire began not even 50 years later. Less than a year after the 1851 French coup d'état by Napoleon's nephew Louis-Napoléon Bonaparte (which ended in the dissolution of the French National Assembly), the French Second Republic was transformed into the Second French Empire, established by a referendum on 7 November 1852. President Bonaparte, who had been elected as such by the French people, officially became Napoleon III, Emperor of the French, from 2 December 1852. This date was chosen for its symbolic and historical importance: on 2 December, 48 years earlier, his uncle had been crowned as the first emperor of the first empire.

Napoleon III's rule would de facto end on 28 July 1870, when his power as head of state was transferred to his wife and regent Eugenie de Montijo; she would substantively rule, as empress regent of the French, while Napoleon III was overseas with his army. Formally, Napoleon III's time as emperor—and thus his wife's time as empress regent—ended on 4 September 1870, when he was officially deposed after his defeat and capture at the Battle of Sedan during the Franco-Prussian War. In March 1871, he was released from Prussian custody and exiled to Chislehurst, United Kingdom, where the former emperor died on 9 January 1873.

Since the death of Napoleon III's only son, Louis-Napoléon, in 1879, the House of Bonaparte has had a number of claimants to the French throne. The current claimant is Charles, Prince Napoléon, who became head of the House of Bonaparte on 3 May 1997. Charles' claim is challenged by his own son, Jean-Christophe, Prince Napoléon, who was named as heir in his late grandfather's testament.

== Honours ==
Among the honours Napoleon I instituted or received were:

- First French Empire: Grand Master of the Legion of Honour
- First French Empire: Grand Master of the Order of the Reunion
- Kingdom of Italy: Grand Master of the Order of the Iron Crown
- Austrian Empire: Grand Cross of the Order of St. Stephen, 1810
- Kingdom of Bavaria: Knight of the Order of St. Hubert, 1805
- Kingdom of Denmark: Knight of the Order of the Elephant, 18 May 1808
- Kingdom of Portugal: Grand Cross of the Sash of the Three Orders, 8 May 1805
- Kingdom of Prussia: Knight of the Order of the Black Eagle, 1805
- Russian Empire: Knight of the Order of St. Andrew, July 1807
- Kingdom of Spain: Knight of the Order of the Golden Fleece, 1805
- Kingdom of Sweden: Knight of the Order of the Seraphim, 3 February 1811

== List of emperors ==
=== First French Empire ===
| Name | Lifespan | Reign start | Reign end | Notes | Family | Image |
|---|---|---|---|---|---|---|
| Napoleon I | 15 August 1769 – 5 May 1821 (aged 51) | 18 May 1804 | 5 April 1814 (9 years, 323 days) | — | Bonaparte | Napoleon I of France |
| Napoleon II: the Eaglet | 20 March 1811 – 22 July 1832 (aged 21) | 4 April 1814 | 6 April 1814 (2 days) | Son of Napoleon I, Reign is disputed | Bonaparte | Napoleon II of France |

=== Hundred Days ===
Regarded as a continuation of the First French Empire despite the brief exile of the Emperor Napoleon I

| Name | Lifespan | Reign start | Reign end | Notes | Family | Image |
|---|---|---|---|---|---|---|
| Napoleon I | 15 August 1769 – 5 May 1821 (aged 51) | 20 March 1815 | 22 June 1815 (92 days) | — | Bonaparte | Napoleon I of France |
| Napoleon II: the Eaglet | 20 March 1811 – 22 July 1832 (aged 21) | 22 June 1815 | 7 July 1815 (15 days) | Son of Napoleon I, Reign is disputed | Bonaparte | Napoleon II of France |

=== Second French Empire ===
| Name | Lifespan | Reign start | Reign end | Notes | Family | Image |
|---|---|---|---|---|---|---|
| Napoleon III | 20 April 1808 – 9 January 1873 (aged 64) | 2 December 1852 | 4 September 1870 (17 years, 276 days) | Nephew of Napoleon I Cousin of Napoleon II; Grandson of Empress Joséphine | Bonaparte | Napoleon III of France |

== See also ==
- Crown of Napoleon
- French Crown Jewels
- List of French consorts
- List of French monarchs
