= Louis, Prince Napoléon =

Louis
- Prince Napoléon
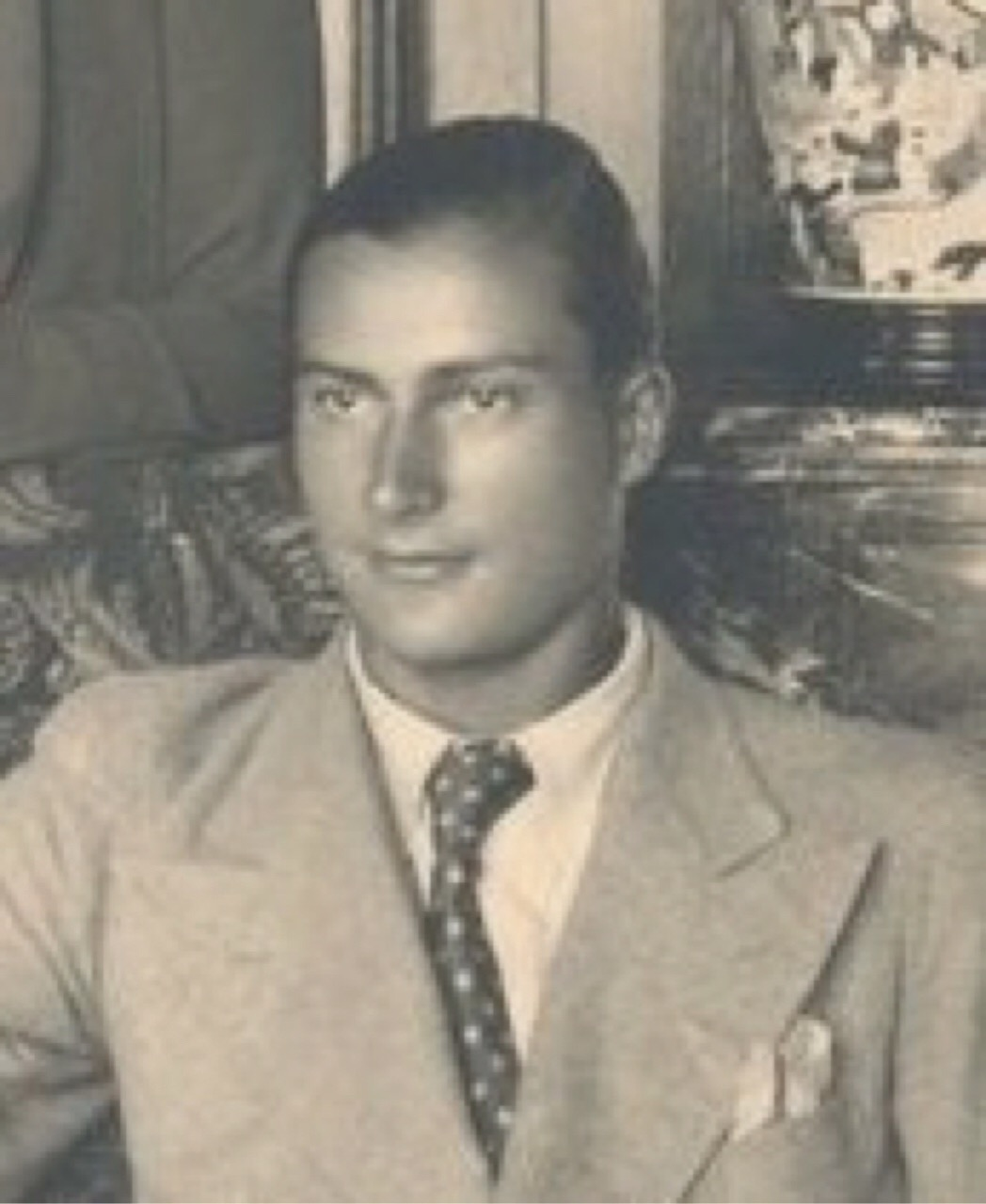

Head of the House of Bonaparte
- Tenure: 3 May 1926 – 3 May 1997
- Predecessor: Victor
- Successor: Charles or Jean-Christophe
- Born: 23 January 1914; Brussels, Belgium
- Died: 3 May 1997 (aged 83); Prangins, Vaud, Switzerland
- Spouse: Alix de Foresta (m. 1949)
- Issue: Charles, Prince Napoléon; Princess Catherine; Princess Laure; Prince Jérôme
- House: Bonaparte
- Father: Victor, Prince Napoléon
- Mother: Princess Clémentine of Belgium

Louis, Prince Napoléon, titular 4th Prince of Montfort (Louis Jérôme Victor Emmanuel Léopold Marie; 23 January 1914 – 3 May 1997) was a member of the Bonaparte dynasty. He was the pretender to the Imperial throne of France, as Napoléon VI, from 3 May 1926 until his death on 3 May 1997.

== Early life ==
He was born in Brussels, Belgium, due to the law which then banned heirs of the former French ruling dynasties from residing in France. He was the son of Victor, Prince Napoléon and his wife Princess Clémentine of Belgium, daughter of King Leopold II of the Belgians and Archduchess Marie Henriette of Austria. Leopold II's mother, Princess Louise-Marie of Orléans, was the eldest daughter of King Louis Philippe I, ruler of France during the July Monarchy.

As a child, Prince Louis spent some time in England, where he stayed with Empress Eugénie, the widow of Napoleon III. He was educated in Leuven, Belgium, and in Lausanne, Switzerland. When his father died on 3 May 1926, the 12-year-old Prince Louis succeeded as the Bonapartist pretender to the Imperial throne of France, his mother acting as regent until he came of age.

== Second World War and later life ==
On the outbreak of the Second World War, Prince Louis wrote to the French prime minister, Édouard Daladier, offering to serve in the French Army. His offer was refused, and so he assumed the nom de guerre of "Louis Blanchard" and joined the French Foreign Legion, seeing action in North Africa before being demobilised in 1941, following the Second Armistice at Compiègne. He then joined the French Resistance and was arrested by the Germans after attempting to cross the Pyrenees on his way to London to join Free French leader Charles de Gaulle. Following his arrest, he spent time in various prisons, including Fresnes. Following his release, he joined the French Resistance group Organisation de Résistance dans l'Armee under the name "Louis Monnier". Another member of the Charles Martel Brigade to which he belonged was his cousin Joachim, Prince Murat, who was killed in July 1944. Prince Louis himself narrowly escaped death a month later when, on 28 August, he was badly wounded as part of a seven-man patrol that came under attack; he was the sole survivor. Following his recovery, he joined the Alpine Division and was later decorated for bravery. After his second cousin Jerome Napoleon Charles Bonaparte died in America in 1945, he became the sole living male member of the Bonaparte line.

After the war, he lived in Switzerland and, irregularly, in Paris until 1950, when the law of banishment against the heads of France's former ruling dynasties was repealed.

Prince Louis became a successful businessman, with a number of financial interests in Africa. In 1951, the prince sent a memorial wreath bearing the Napoleonic 'N' insignia to the funeral of William, German Crown Prince, son of the deposed Wilhelm II, German Emperor. This was seen as an ironic gesture by royalists at the time, given the fact that it was the German House of Hohenzollern that had defeated and dethroned Louis Napoleon's own imperial house during the Franco-Prussian War in 1870.

In his will, Prince Louis designated his grandson, Jean-Christophe, Prince Napoléon, as his successor, bypassing his elder son, Prince Charles Napoléon.

Prince Louis died in Prangins, Switzerland, in 1997.

== Marriage and issue ==
Louis married Alix de Foresta (born 4 April 1926), daughter of Count Albéric de Foresta, on 16 August 1949 at Linières-Bouton, France. They had four children:

- Prince Charles Marie Jérôme Victor (b. 19 October 1950); claims headship of the House of Bonaparte and the title Prince Napoléon.
- Princess Catherine Élisabeth Albérique Marie (b. 19 October 1950); married, firstly, on 4 June 1974, in Prangins, Switzerland, Nicolò San Martino d'Agliè dei marchesi di Fontaneto con San Germano (a nephew of Queen Paola of Belgium), b. 3 July 1948, divorced in 1982 without issue. She married, secondly, on 22 October 1982, in Paris, France, Jean-Claude Dualé (b. 3 November 1936 in Medjez-el-Bab, Tunisia) and had two daughters:
  - Charlotte Dualé (13 October 1982)
  - Marion Dualé (29 March 1985)
- Princess Laure Clémentine Geneviève (b. 8 October 1952 in Paris, France); married on 23 December 1982 to Jean-Claude Lecomte (15 March 1948 – Sep 2009) and had one son:
  - Clément Louis Lecomte (7 July 1995)
- Prince Jérôme Xavier Marie Joseph Victor (b. 14 January 1957), married on 2 September 2013 to Licia Innocenti.

== Decorations ==
- Commandeur de la Legion of Honour
- Croix de Guerre 1939–1945.
- Médaille de la Résistance
- Médaille commémorative de la Seconde Guerre mondiale

== Ancestry ==
Ancestors of Louis, Prince Napoléon

8. Jérôme Bonaparte, King of Westphalia
4. Prince Napoléon-Jérôme Bonaparte
9. Princess Catharina of Württemberg
2. Victor, Prince Napoléon
10. Victor Emmanuel II of Italy
5. Princess Maria Clotilde of Savoy
11. Archduchess Adelaide of Austria
1. Louis, Prince Napoléon
12. Leopold I of Belgium
6. Leopold II of Belgium
13. Princess Louise of Orléans
3. Princess Clémentine of Belgium
14. Archduke Joseph, Palatine of Hungary
7. Archduchess Marie Henriette of Austria
15. Duchess Maria Dorothea of Württemberg

Louis, Prince Napoléon House of Bonaparte Born: 23 January 1914 Died: 3 May 1997
Titles in pretence
Preceded by Napoléon V Victor	— TITULAR — Emperor of the French; 3 May 1926 – 3 May 1997; Reason for succession failure: Empire abolished in 1870; Kingdom dissolved in 1813	Succeeded by Disputed: Napoléon VII Charles or Napoléon VII Jean-Christophe
