= Wheelock (name) =

Wheelock or Wheelocke is an English surname and given name. It is derived from the Old Welsh (or possibly Ancient British Celtic) ancestor of the Welsh word chevel-og, meaning 'winding river' (see River Wheelock). The name may refer to:

== People ==
=== Surname ===
- Abraham Wheelocke (1593–1653), English scholar and librarian
- Arthur K. Wheelock Jr., American art expert
- Cyrus H. Wheelock (1813–1894), American religious leader
- Dennison Wheelock (1871–1927), American musician
- Dora V. Wheelock (1847–1923), American activist and writer
- Douglas H. Wheelock (born 1960), American astronaut
- Eleazar Wheelock (1711–1779), American educator and college founder
- Frank E. Wheelock (1863–1932), American businessman and politician
- Frederic M. Wheelock (1902–1987), American scholar and writer
- Jaime Wheelock (born 1946), Nicaraguan politician
- Jerome Wheelock (1834–1902), American inventor
- Jerome H. Wheelock (1877–1966), American educator and politician
- Jerry Wheelock (1784–1861), American businessman
- John Wheelock (1754–1817), American college president
- John Hall Wheelock (1886–1978), American poet
- Karla Wheelock (born 1968), Mexican mountain climber and writer
- Lucy Wheelock (1857–1946), American educator and college founder
- Merrill G. Wheelock (1822–1866), American artist and architect
- Ralph Wheelock (1600–1683), American teacher
- Sean Wheelock (born 1974), American sports commentator
- Simeon Wheelock (1741–1786), American militiaman
- William E. Wheelock (1852–1922), American piano manufacturer

=== First name ===
- Alexander Wheelock Thayer (1817–1897), American Beethoven biographer
- Wheelock G. Veazey (1835–1898), American lawyer and judge
- Wheelock Whitney Sr. (1894–1957), American businessman
- Wheelock Whitney Jr. (1926–2016), American businessman and politician
- Wheelock Whitney III (born 1949), American art collector

== See also ==
- Wheelock (disambiguation)
