= Wheelock Whitney =

Wheelock Whitney may refer to:

- Wheelock Whitney Sr. (1894–1957), or "Wheels" Whitney, businessman
- Wheelock Whitney Jr. (1926–2016), or "Whee" Whitney, businessman, politician, philanthropist, and sports team and racehorse owner
- Wheelock Whitney (historian), or "Lock" Whitney, art historian, art dealer, author and philanthropist

== See also ==
- Whitney family
