= Palazzo Serristori =

Palazzo Serristori may refer to:

- Palazzo Serristori, Oltrarno, a Renaissance palace in Oltrarno quarter of Florence
- Palazzo Serristori, Rome, a Renaissance palace in Borgo rione of Rome
- Palazzo Cocchi-Serristori, a Renaissance palace in Florence
