= Benson K. Whitney =

American diplomat (born 1956)

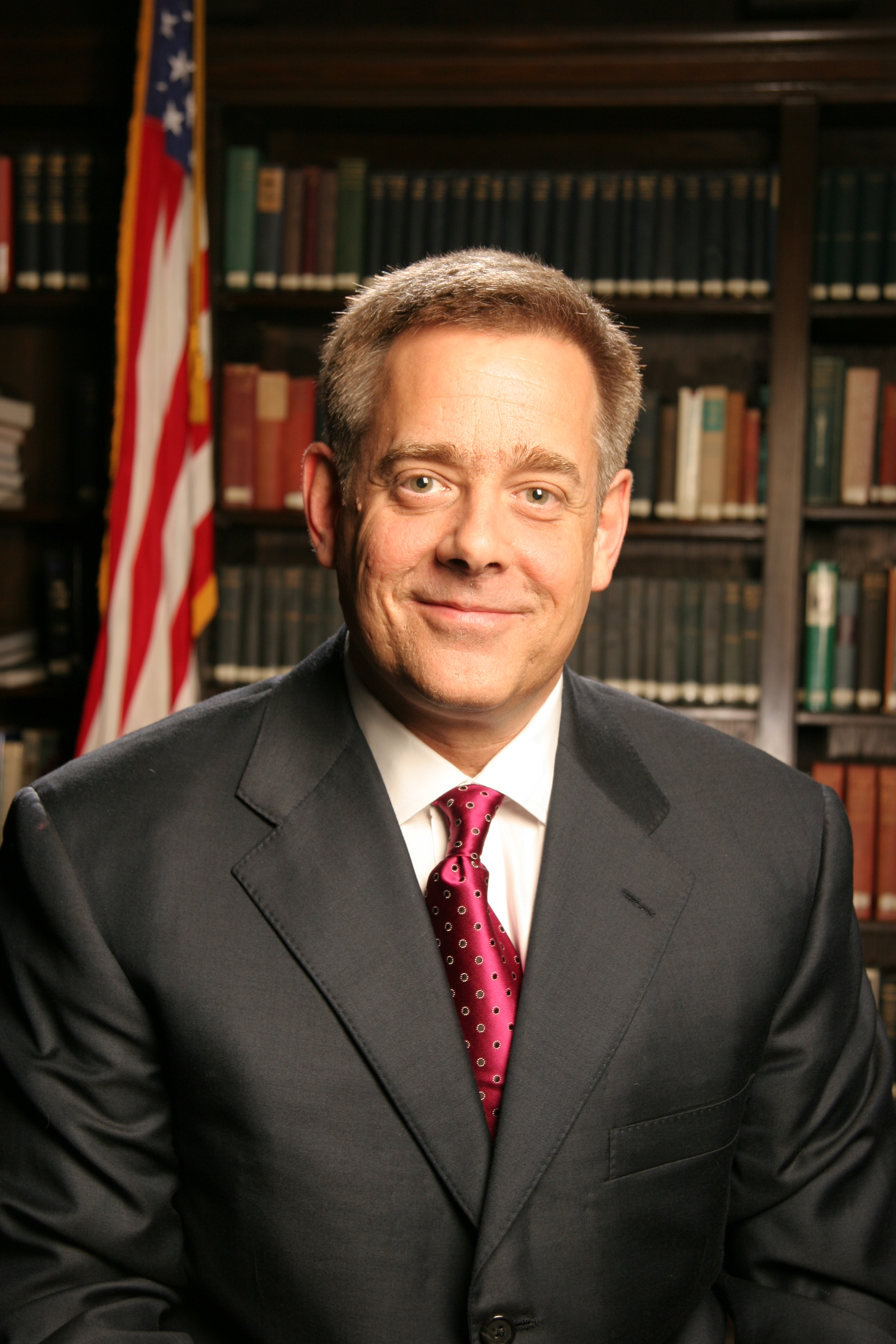

United States Ambassador to Norway
- In office January 12, 2006 – October 21, 2009
- President: George W. Bush; Barack Obama
- Preceded by: John D. Ong
- Succeeded by: Barry B. White

Personal details
- Born: August 17, 1956 (age 70) Saint Paul, Minnesota, U.S.
- Party: Republican
- Spouse: Mary
- Relations: Wheelock Whitney I (Grandfather); Wheelock Whitney II (Father); Wheelock Whitney III (Brother)
- Education: Vassar College; University of Minnesota Law School
- Profession: Jurist; diplomat

Benson Kelley Whitney (born August 17, 1956, in Saint Paul, Minnesota) was the United States Ambassador to Norway from 2006 to 2009.

== Early life and education ==
Whitney grew up in the Minnesota branch of the prominent American Whitney family and is of close relation to the Vanderbilt family. He graduated high school from Verde Valley School in Sedona, Arizona, in 1974. He graduated with an A.B. from Vassar College magna cum laude in Poughkeepsie, New York, and a J.D. from the University of Minnesota Law School magna cum laude. While at Minnesota he was an editor of the Law Review and member of the Order of the Coif.

== Career ==
Whitney went on to practice law with Popham, Haik, Schnobrich, and Kaufman Ltd. where he specialized in regulatory industries such as health care, cable television and election law. He became the managing general partner of the Gideon Hixon Fund, an evergreen venture capital fund which focused on early-stage technology and health care companies in Minnesota and California. He was elected president of the Minnesota Venture Capital Association. He was also chief executive officer of Whitney Management Company, a private investment advisory firm. Whitney's entrance into politics came in 2004, where he was the Minnesota executive director and finance chair for the Bush-Cheney 2004 presidential campaign, as well as Minnesota finance chair for the Republican National Committee.

== Diplomatic service ==
Benson K. Whitney was nominated as the U.S. Ambassador to the Kingdom of Norway by President George W. Bush on September 23, 2005. His nomination was confirmed by the U.S. Senate on October 28, 2005, and he was sworn in by U.S. Secretary of State Condoleezza Rice on November 28, 2005. He presented his credentials to King Harald V of Norway on January 12, 2006.

== Personal life ==
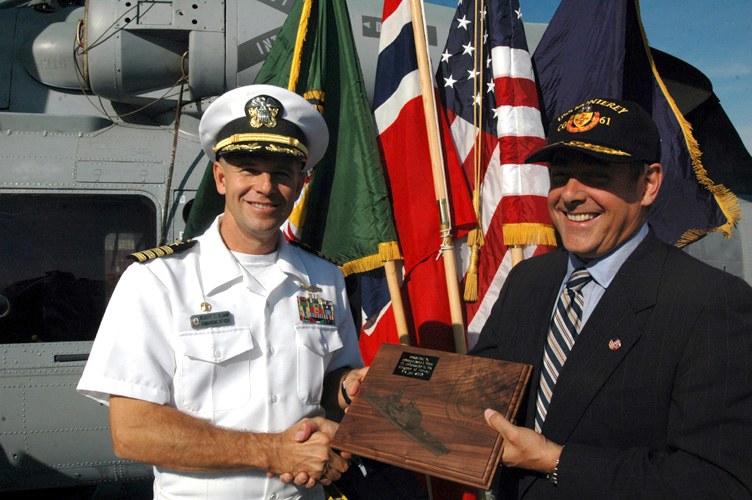
USS Monterey (CG 61) Commanding Officer, Capt. Robert Oldani, presents United States Ambassador to the Kingdom of Norway, Benson K. Whitney, with a Monterey plaque.

Whitney has been a trustee, director, chairman or advisor of a number of non-profits including the Guthrie Theater, Wilderness Inquiry, Persephone Fund, Headwaters Fund, Minnesotans for Term Limits, and the Minneapolis Academy. He is a member of the Basilica of St. Mary in Minneapolis where he has served as a liturgical minister. Whitney and his wife Mary have four children.

Benson is a descendant of the prominent American Whitney family and is of close relation to the Vanderbilt family. His father married Chief Justice Kathleen A. Blatz of the Minnesota Supreme Court in 2005, who was only one year his son's senior.

Whitney has donated $20,000 to Minnesota Action Network, a Republican independent expenditure committee, in order to help support Tim Pawlenty in the Minnesota gubernatorial election of 2018.

== Sources ==
- "Benson K. Whitney". Archived from the original on 2007-09-03. US embassy in Norway bio on Whitney
- United States Department of State: Ambassadors to Norway
- U.S. Embassy Oslo - Public Affairs Newsletter, July 2009

Diplomatic posts
Preceded by John D. Ong	U.S. Ambassador to Norway; 2006–2009	Succeeded by Barry B. White
