= Blatz =

Blatz may refer to:

- An American brand of beer formerly produced by the Valentin Blatz Brewing Company
- Blatz (band)

For people with surname Blatz, see:

- Blatz (surname)
