= Brigand and His Wife in Prayer =

1834 painting by Léopold Robert

- Artist: Léopold Robert
- Year: 1824
- Medium: Oil on canvas
- Dimensions: 44.8 cm × 36.5 cm (17.6 in × 14.4 in)
- Location: Metropolitan Museum of Art, New York

Brigand and His Wife in Prayer is an early 19th century painting by Léopold Robert. Done in oil paint on canvas, the work depicts a brigand and his wife in prayer before a cross in the mountains of central Italy. The painting is currently on display at the Metropolitan Museum of Art and is part of the museum's Whitney Collection, mostly French works from the 18th and 19th centuries collected and given by Wheelock Whitney III.

== Description ==
Brigand and His Wife in Prayer was painted by Swiss painter Louis Léopold Robert in 1824. The work concerns a brigand and his wife, part of the brigante subculture of central Italy. The people and culture of the Brigante became a common subject of Robert's painting after he witnessed the mass arrest of brigands and their families by the government of the Papal States. The painting was originally intended to be entered to win the Prix de Rome, a prestigious art scholarship. However, due to Robert's nationality and the contentious nature of post-Napoleonic European politics, Robert instead painted the work for the Salon of 1824 in Paris. The painting was well received for its naturalistic depiction of people, though it was criticized for not subscribing to a particular genre of art.

The painting itself portrays a brigand and his pregnant wife kneeling in prayer before a roadside shrine. The place of worship takes the form of a simple wooden cross located on a remote road, with vast mountains towering in the background. The couple are both dressed as people of their class and vocation would be. The husband is dressed in a frilled shirt and overcoat, and rests his musket at his shoulder. The wife is dressed in traditional peasant's garb and clutches a rosary in her right hand. They pray for the health and success of each-other, specifically for the success of the husband's criminal activities and for the health of the heavily pregnant wife. The sympathy-inspiring depictions of the frugality and piety of the couple reflect Robert's fascination with the culture of the Italian brigands, who the painter found to be a faithful people despite their criminality.
