= Heinrich Franz Brandt =

German medal designer

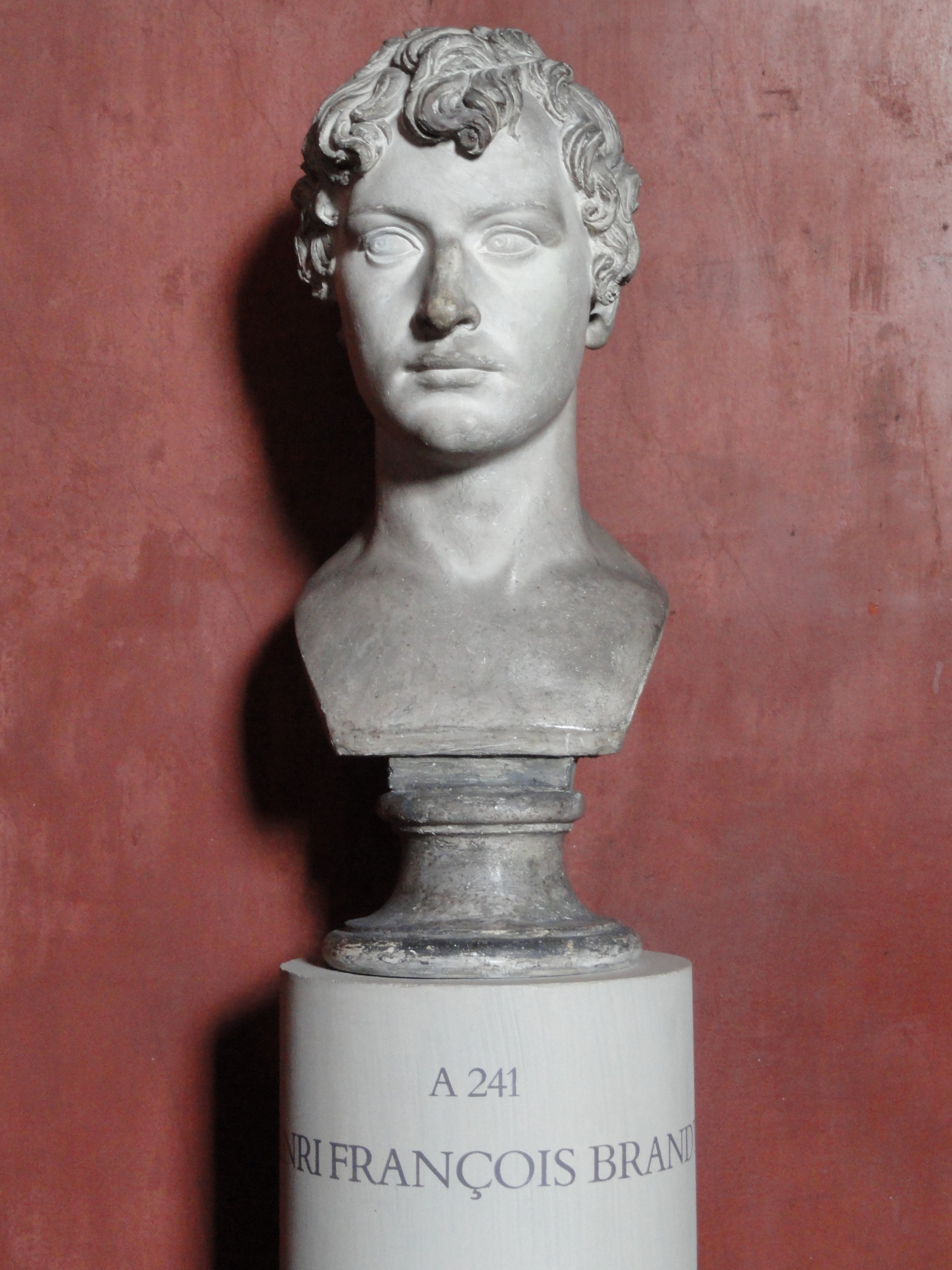
- Bust by Bertel Thorvaldsen, 1817
- Born: 13 January 1789
- Died: 9 May 1845 (aged 56)
- Known for: Sculpture

Heinrich Franz Brandt (13 January 1789 – 9 May 1845) was a medal designer from the Principality of Neuchâtel who worked in Berlin.

== Biography ==
Brandt was born in La Chaux-de-Fonds, in the Principality of Neuchâtel. After a short apprenticeship, in 1808 he went to Paris where he became a student of the medalist and mint supervisor Jean-Pierre Droz. At the same time, he studied sculpture with Charles-Antoine Bridan and worked for some time with his relative Louis Léopold Robert in the atelier of David. In 1813 he was awarded the Grand Prix de Rome for his work “Theseus, der die Waffen seines Vaters auffindet” (Theseus discovers his father's weapons). He then, via his home, went to Italy as a pensioner of the Villa Medici. There he distinguished himself with a series of works, and when he left Rome in 1817, it was with an appointment as chief designer and engraver to the mint in Berlin. In 1824, he became professor and member of the Prussian Academy of Arts in Berlin.

Brandt's numerous works are distinguished by beauty and clarity of line. His earliest work, a medal honoring Napoleon, was completely in the French style. Later he worked more in the style of Christian Daniel Rauch. This later style is seen in his last work honoring Alexander von Humboldt. Thanks to Brandt, the Berlin mint's production was much improved. A complete catalogue of the medals he designed may be found in the publications of the Berlin Academy for 1845.
