= Blatz (surname) =

Blatz as a surname may refer to:

- Jerome Blatz (1923–2009), Minnesota attorney and politician
- Kathleen A. Blatz (born 1954), Minnesota judge and politician
- Kelly Blatz (born 1987), American actor and singer
- Valentin Blatz (1826–1894), German-American brewer and banker, founder of the Valentin Blatz Brewing Company
- William E. Blatz (1895–1964), German-Canadian developmental psychologist
