= Wheelock =

Wheelock and similar may refer to:

== Firms and buildings ==
- Cooper Wheelock, a manufacturer of fire alarm and general signaling products
- Wheelock and Company, formerly British Hong Wheelock and Marden Company Limited
- Wheelock College, a small liberal arts college in Boston, Massachusetts
- Wheelock House, a building in City of Victoria, Hong Kong
- Wheelock Place, a building in Singapore

== People ==
- Wheelock (name)

== Places ==
- River Wheelock in Cheshire in England
- Wheelock, Cheshire, a long village south of Sandbach in Cheshire in England
- Wheelock, North Dakota, a ghost town in the United States
- Wheelock, Texas, a small town
- Wheelock, Vermont, town in northern Vermont

== Other ==
- Wheellock, a mechanism for firing a gun
- Wheelock's Latin, a well-known beginning Latin textbook
- The word "wheelock" occasionally occurs as an improper usage of wheel clamp
