= Julie Clary =

Queen of Naples (1806–08) and Spain (1808–13)

- Comtesse de Survilliers
- Portrait with her daughter Zénaïde by Robert Lefèvre, 1807

Queen consort of Spain and the Indies
- Tenure: 8 June 1808 – 11 December 1813

Queen consort of Naples
- Tenure: 30 March 1806 – 6 June 1808
- Born: Marie Julie Clary; 26 December 1771; Marseille, Kingdom of France
- Died: 7 April 1845 (aged 73); Florence, Grand Duchy of Tuscany
- Burial: Santa Croce, Florence, Italy
- Spouse: Joseph I of Spain and Naples (m. 1794; died 1844)
- Issue among others: Zénaïde, Princess of Canino and Musignano; Charlotte Napoléone Bonaparte
- House: Bonaparte (by marriage)
- Father: François Clary
- Mother: Françoise Rose Somis

Marie Julie Clary (26 December 1771 – 7 April 1845), also known as Julie Bonaparte, was Queen of Naples, then of Spain and the Indies, as the wife of Joseph Bonaparte, who was King of Naples from January 1806 to June 1808, and later King of Spain and the Spanish West Indies from 25 June 1808 to 11 December 1813.

== Early life ==
Marie Julie Clary was born in Marseille, France, the daughter of François Clary (Marseille, St Ferreol, 24 February 1725 – Marseille, 20 January 1794), a wealthy silk manufacturer and merchant of Irish heritage, and his second wife (married on 26 June 1759) Françoise Rose Somis (Marseille, St. Ferreol, 30 August 1737 – Paris, 28 January 1815). Her sister Désirée Clary, six years younger, became Queen of Sweden and Norway when her husband, Marshal Bernadotte, was crowned King Charles XIV John of Sweden (Charles III John of Norway). Their brother, Nicolas Joseph Clary, was created 1st Comte Clary and married Anne Jeanne Rouyer (their granddaughter would be the first wife of Joachim, 4th Prince Murat).

== Marriage ==
On 1 August 1794, at Cuges (Bouches-du-Rhône department), she married Joseph Bonaparte, elder brother of Napoléon Bonaparte. She accompanied her spouse to Italy when he became ambassador to Rome in 1797, and then settled with him in Paris in 1804.

In 1804, when her brother-in-law Napoleon made himself emperor, he named his brother Joseph Imperial Prince, making Julie an Imperial Princess. During the coronation of the emperor and empress the same year, Julie was given the task of carrying the train of the empress with her sisters-in-law.

Although Julie was reportedly able to behave in accordance with court etiquette and "royal formality", she preferred to live a private life surrounded by her family and relatives in her chateau in Mortefontaine, Oise (which had been bought in 1800), away from court as well as away from her adulterous spouse.

== Queen of Naples ==
Joseph was made King of Naples in 1806, thereby making Julie queen consort of Naples. She preferred to stay separated from him in Mortefontaine, however, and was ceremoniously treated as queen in the Imperial court of Paris.

She finally joined Joseph in Naples before April 1808, when she was sent there by Napoleon to support him, as he by that time faced a rebellion. When they left, the Napolitans were convinced that they had removed many valuables with them, and commented:

"The King arrived like a sovereign, and left like a brigand. The Queen arrived in rags and left like a sovereign."

== Queen of Spain ==
Coat of arms as queen of Spain

In 1808, Joseph was made King of Spain and Julie thereby formally became Queen of Spain. She was the first queen of Spain not of royal birth. However, she did not join him when he traveled to Spain and in fact never lived there, preferring to remain in her residence in Mortefontaine. She was kept informed from Vichy and Plombières about her husband's adulterous relationships in Spain.

In France, she was regarded as the representative of Joseph and his kingdom and ceremoniously treated as the queen of Spain at the French Imperial court of Napoleon. She effectively functioned as an ambassador and informer of Joseph and upheld a political correspondence with him regarding Napoleon's plans of Spain, warning Joseph that he should make precautions necessary to control Spain, its unity, finances and army himself, as Napoleon would never allow Spain to be too independent. In Spain, she was referred to as "Reina ausente" ('The Absent Queen').

== The fall of Napoleon ==
Napoleon's army was defeated at the Battle of Vitoria on 21 June 1813. During the war, Julie gave refuge to her sister Desirée Clary, who by her marriage to the Crown Prince of Sweden was in fact an enemy citizen, as well as her sister-in-law Catharina of Württemberg, in her home at Mortefontaine, and when the allied troops took Paris in 1814, Julie herself took refuge in the home of her sister Desirée in Paris. After the abdication of Napoleon in 1814, Julie bought the castle of Prangins in Switzerland, near Lake Léman.

During the Hundred Days in 1815, Julie was among those who welcomed Napoleon to the Palace in Paris; she dressed in an Imperial court robe, alongside his former stepdaughter Hortense.

After the Battle of Waterloo and the second downfall of Napoleon in 1815, the members of the Bonaparte family were exiled, and Joseph bought a property in New Jersey, near the Delaware River, with the proceeds of the sale of Spanish paintings taken from ransacked Madrid palaces, castles, monasteries and town halls; Julie herself, however, did not join him there, but left with her daughters to Frankfurt, where she stayed for six years, separated from her French-American husband.

In 1816, her sister Desiree, who was Crown Princess of Sweden, wished to bring Julie with her upon her return to Sweden; her husband the crown prince, however, thought this unwise, as Julie was a member of the Bonaparte family and her presence might be taken as a sign that he sided with the deposed Napoleon, and in the end, this came to nothing.

== Later life ==
Portrait depicting Queen Julie nearing the end of her life in exile in Italy, by Michel Ghislain Stapleaux, 1834

Julie settled in Brussels in 1821, and then in Florence, Italy, at the Palazzo Serristori. She did not socialize with the French people. She was described as charming, quiet, dignified and peaceful and generally well liked. In 1823, she parted with her sister Desiree, who became queen of Sweden.

In 1840, Joseph joined Julie in Florence. In spite of his adultery, she referred to Joseph as "my beloved husband". Joseph Bonaparte died on 28 July 1844, aged 76. Julie died eight months later in Florence, on 7 April 1845, at the age of seventy-three. She was buried next to Joseph at the Basilica of Santa Croce in Florence. In 1862, the self-proclaimed French Emperor Napoleon III brought Joseph Bonaparte's remains back to France and had them inhumed to the right of his younger brother, the Emperor Napoleon I. The remains of Julie are still at the Basilica of Santa Croce in Florence beside those of her daughter, Charlotte, who died in Lucca, in Italy, on 3 March 1839, aged 36, giving birth to a stillborn child.

== Children ==
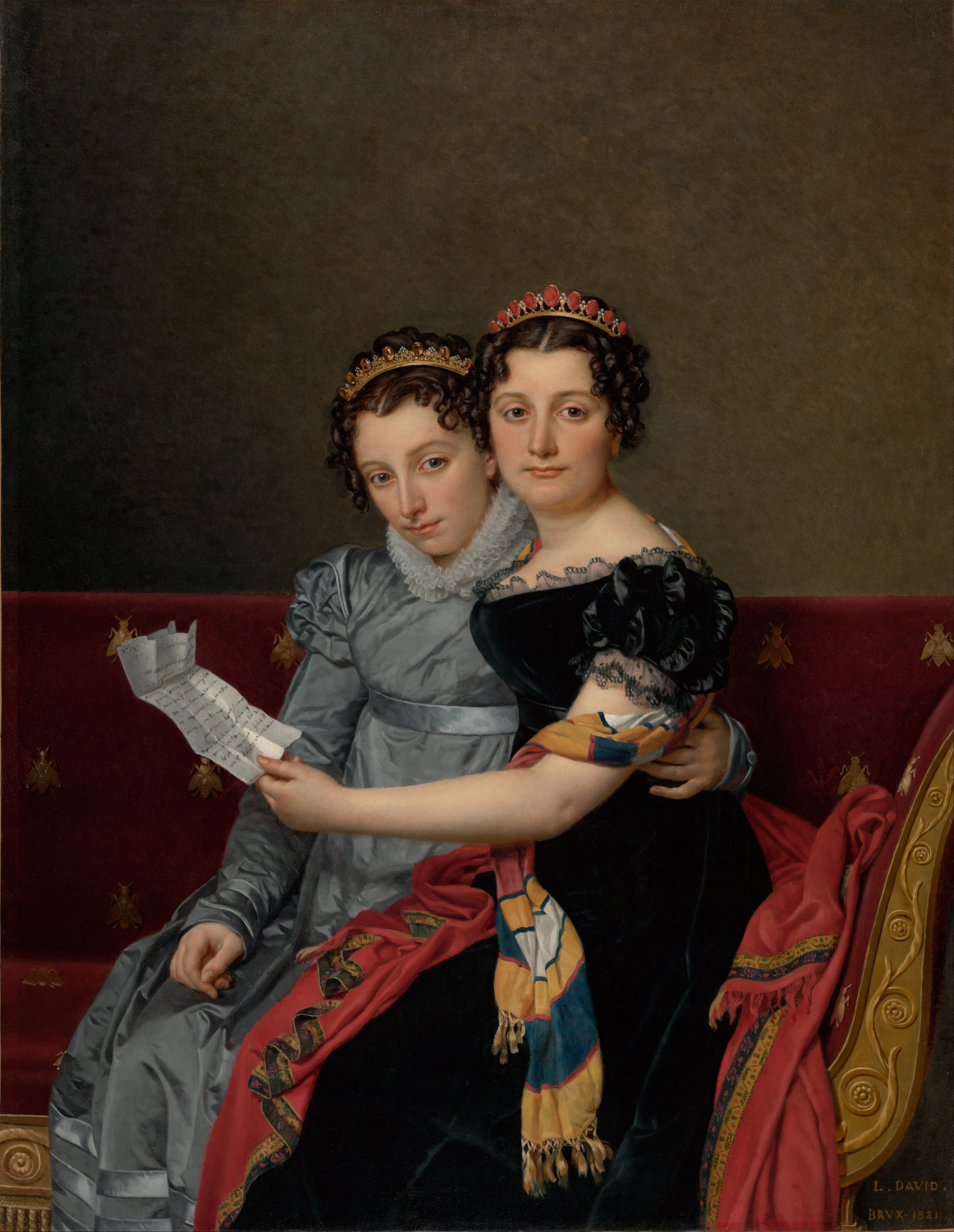
The Sisters Zénaïde and Charlotte Bonaparte by Jacques-Louis David, 1821

Joseph and Julie Bonaparte had three daughters:

- Julie Joséphine Bonaparte (Genoa, 29 February 1796 – Genoa, 6 June 1797).
- Zénaïde Laetitia Julie Bonaparte (Paris, 8 July 1801 – Naples, 8 August 1854); married in Brussels on 29 June 1822 to Charles Lucien Bonaparte, 2nd Prince of Canino and Musignano (Paris, 24 May 1803 - Paris, 29 July 1857).
- Charlotte Napoléone Bonaparte (Paris, 31 October 1802 – Sarzana, 2 March 1839); married in Brussels on 23 July 1826 to Napoléon Louis Bonaparte (Paris, 11 October 1804 - Rome, 17 March 1831), formerly King of Holland and Grand-Duke of Berg, without issue.

Julie Clary Born: 26 December 1771 Died: 7 April 1845
Royal titles
Preceded by Marie Caroline of Austria	Queen consort of Naples and Sicily; 1806–1808	Succeeded by Caroline Bonaparte
Preceded by Maria Luisa of Parma	Queen consort of Spain and the Indies; 1808–1813	Succeeded by Maria Isabel of Portugal
