= 1964 United States Senate election in Minnesota =

- November 3, 1964
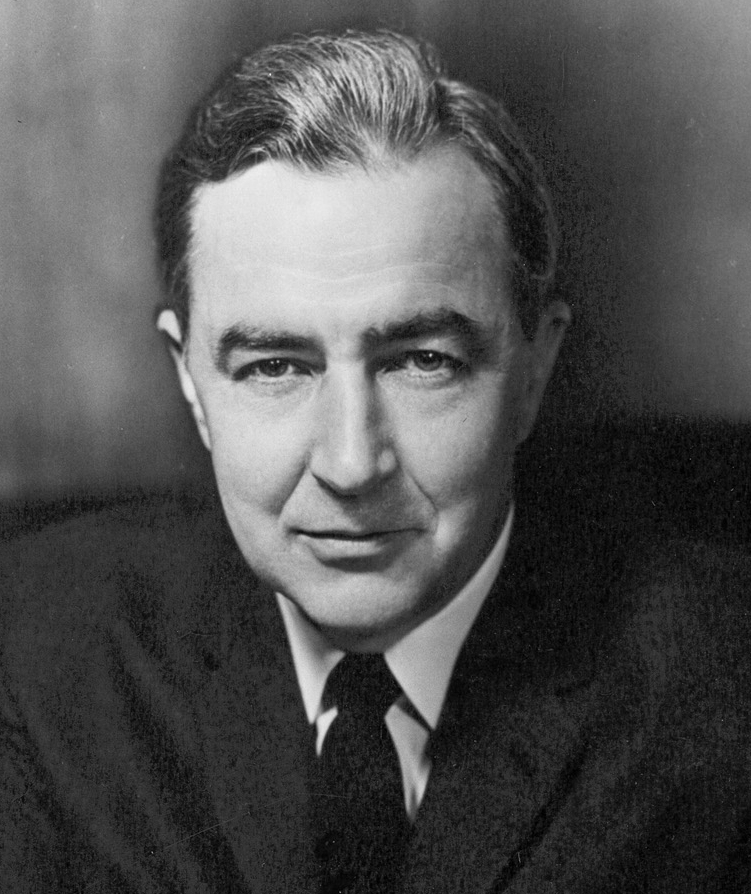

Nominee	Eugene J. McCarthy	Wheelock Whitney Jr.
Party	Democratic (DFL)	Republican
Popular vote	931,363	605,933
Percentage	60.34%	39.26%
- County results McCarthy: 40–50% 50–60% 60–70% 70–80% Whitney: 50–60%
U.S. senator before election
Eugene J. McCarthy
Democratic (DFL)
Elected U.S. Senator
Eugene J. McCarthy
Democratic (DFL)

The 1964 United States Senate election in Minnesota took place on November 3, 1964. Incumbent Democratic U.S. Senator Eugene McCarthy defeated Republican challenger Wheelock Whitney Jr., to win a second term.

== Democratic–Farmer–Labor primary ==
=== Candidates ===
==== Declared ====
- Eugene J. McCarthy, incumbent U.S. Senator since 1959
- Joseph Nowak
- R. H. Underdahl

=== Results ===
Democratic primary election results
Party	Candidate	Votes	%
Democratic (DFL)	Eugene J. McCarthy (Incumbent)	245,068	90.47%
Democratic (DFL)	R. H. Underdahl	14,562	5.38%
Democratic (DFL)	Joseph Nowak	11,267	4.16%
Total votes		270,897	100.00%

== Republican primary ==
=== Candidates ===
==== Declared ====
- Wheelock Whitney Jr., investment banker and member of the board of directors of the Minnesota Twins

=== Results ===
Republican primary election results
Party	Candidate	Votes	%
Republican	Wheelock Whitney Jr.	161,363	100.00%
Total votes		161,363	100.00%

== General election ==
=== Candidates ===
- William Braatz (Industrial Government)
- Everett Luoma (Socialist Workers)
- Eugene McCarthy, incumbent U.S. Senator since 1959 (Democratic–Farmer–Labor)
- Wheelock Whitney Jr., investment banker and member of the board of directors of the Minnesota Twins (Republican)

=== Results ===
General election results
Party	Candidate	Votes	%
Democratic (DFL)	Eugene J. McCarthy (Incumbent)	931,363	60.34%
Republican	Wheelock Whitney, Jr.	605,933	39.26%
Industrial Government	William Braatz	3,947	0.26%
Socialist Workers	Everett E. Luoma	2,357	0.15%
Total votes		1,543,600	100.00%
Majority		325,430	21.08%
Democratic (DFL) hold			

== See also ==
- United States Senate elections, 1964
