= John D. Ong =

American business executive and diplomat (1933–2026)

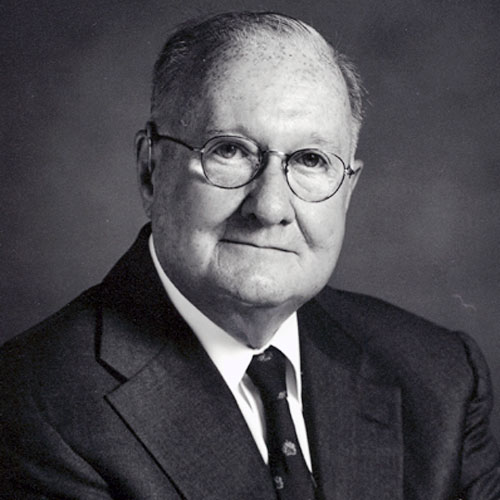

United States Ambassador to Norway
- In office February 27, 2002 – November 21, 2005
- President: George W. Bush
- Preceded by: Robin Chandler Duke
- Succeeded by: Benson K. Whitney

Personal details
- Born: John Doyle Ong; September 29, 1933 Uhrichsville, Ohio, U.S.
- Died: June 4, 2026 (aged 92) Pennsylvania, U.S.
- Spouse: Mary Lee Ong
- Children: 3

John Doyle Ong (September 29, 1933 – June 4, 2026) was an American business executive. He served as United States Ambassador to Norway from 2002 to 2005.

== Life and career ==
Ong was born in Uhrichsville, Ohio, on September 29, 1933. He graduated from Ohio State University with a bachelor's and master's degree before studying law at Harvard University. Ong also received honorary doctorates from Ohio State University, Kent State University, the University of Akron, and South Dakota State University. A longtime employee of the B. F. Goodrich Company, Ong served as chairman and chief executive officer of the company from 1979 to 1997. In 1984, President Reagan appointed Ong to the President’s Commission on Industrial Competitiveness, where he served as co-chair of its International Trade Committee. He retired in 1997 as chairman of the board of directors. Ong was a trustee emeritus at Western Reserve Academy where the John D. Ong Library is named in his honor.

He played a leadership role in a number of key organizations involved with education and business. He was a life Trustee of the University of Chicago and was a Trustee of Ohio State University, the Musical Arts Association of Cleveland, Ohio (Cleveland Orchestra), the Fort Ligonier Association and a trustee emeritus of Western Reserve Academy in Hudson, Ohio. Ong was a leading advocate for business involvement in civic and cultural activities, both nationally and in northeast Ohio. He was a former chairman of the Business Roundtable, the National Alliance of Business, the Business Committee for the Arts, New American Schools, Inc., and the Ohio Business Roundtable. He was a member of The Business Council from 1989 until 2005. He was also a member of the Council of Retired Chief Executives and the Council of American Ambassadors. He served as a director of seven S&P 500 companies.

At the end of his ambassadorship in November 2005, Ong was given the Grand Cross of the Royal Norwegian Order of Merit.

Ong died from kidney failure at a hospital in Pennsylvania on June 4, 2026, at the age of 92.

Diplomatic posts
Preceded by Robin Chandler Duke	United States Ambassador to Norway; 2002–2005	Succeeded by Benson Whitney
