= François Clary =

18th-century French merchant

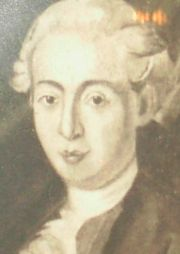
- François Clary
- Born: 24 February 1725; Saint-Ferréol, Marseille, Kingdom of France
- Died: 20 January 1794 (aged 68); Marseille, French First Republic
- Noble family: Clary
- Spouses: Gabrielle Fléchon (m. 1751; died 1758) Françoise Rose Somis (m. 1759)
- Issue more...: Julie, Queen of Spain and Naples; Désirée, Queen of Sweden and Norway
- Father: Joseph Clary
- Mother: Françoise Agnès Ammoric

François Clary (24 February 1725 – 20 January 1794) was a French merchant who made a fortune in import and export business. He is an ancestor of many members of European royalty via his daughters Julie Clary, Queen of Spain and Naples, and Désirée Clary, Queen of Sweden and Norway.

== Biography ==
François Clary was born on 24 February 1725 in Saint-Ferréol, Marseille, Bouches-du-Rhône, Kingdom of France, to Joseph Clary (1693–1748) and his wife, Françoise Agnès Ammoric (1705–1776), who were married on 27 February 1724 in Marseille. His father was of Irish descent. On his father's side his grandparents were Jacques Clary (1673–1696) and Catherine Barosse (1673–1757), who were married on 24 November 1690 in Marseille, and his paternal great-grandparents were Antoine Clary and Marguerite Canolle.

François Clary lived in Marseille and ran an import and export business. In trade with coffee and other colonial products, he acquired great wealth. François Clary died on 20 January 1794 in Marseille, French Republic, aged 68.

== Marriages and issue ==
On 13 April 1751, François Clary married his first wife Gabrielle Fléchon (1732–1758) in Église Notre-Dame-des-Accoules, Marseille. They had four children:

- François-Joseph Clary (31 January 1752 – 4 January 1753), died young
- Marie-Jeanne Clary (24 April 1754 – May 1815), she married first Louis Honoré Lejeans (1734–1794) and second Emmanuel Mathieu Pézenas, baron de Pluvinal (1754–1841)
- Marie Thérèse Catherine Clary (2 September 1755 – 1 November 1818), she married Lazare Lejeans (1738–1803)
- Étienne François Clary (8 August 1757 – 25 March 1823), he married Marcelle Guey (died 1804)

Gabrielle Fléchon died on 3 May 1758. On 26 June 1759, François Clary married his second wife Françoise Rose Somis (Marseille, 30 August 1737 – Paris, 28 January 1815), daughter of Joseph Ignace Somis and Catherine Rose Soucheiron, in Église Saint-Ferréol les Augustins, Marseille. They had nine children:

- Joseph Nicolas Clary, 1er comte Clary et de l'Empire, (26 March 1760 – 6 June 1823) he married Anne Jeanne Rouyer (1791–1820)
- Joseph Honoré Clary (11 June 1762 – 23 July 1764), died young
- Marie Anne Rose Clary (25 April 1764 – 19 April 1835), she married Antoine-Ignace Anthoine, baron de Saint-Joseph et de l'Empire (1749–1826), Mayor of Marseille
- Marseille Clary (25 April 1764 – 22 March 1784), not married
- Justinien François Clary (15 April 1766 – 12 November 1794), not married
- Catherine Honorine Clary (19 February 1769 – 18 March 1843), she married Henri Joseph Gabriel Blait de Villeneufve (born 1748)
- Marie Julie Clary (26 December 1771 – 7 April 1845), she married Joseph Bonaparte (1768–1844), King of Naples and Sicily (r. 1806–1808), King of Spain and the Indies (r. 1808–1813), and elder brother of Napoleon Bonaparte
- Basile Clary (12 January 1774 – 16 June 1781), died young
- Bernardine Eugénie Désirée Clary (8 November 1777 – 17 December 1860), she became engaged to Napoleon Bonaparte in 1795, but he broke off the engagement that same year. In August 1798 she married General Jean Bernardotte (1763–1844), who from 1818 to 1844 was king of Sweden and Norway.

== Descendants ==
François Clary and Françoise Rose Somis had 19 grandchildren, including:

- Oscar I of Sweden (1799–1859; r. 1844–1859), King of Sweden and Norway, he married Joséphine de Beauharnais (1807–1876), daughter of Eugène de Beauharnais and Augusta of Bavaria
- Zénaïde Bonaparte (1801–1854), she married Charles Lucien Bonaparte (1803–1857), son of Lucien Bonaparte and Alexandrine de Bleschamp
- Charlotte Bonaparte (1802–1839), she married Napoléon Louis Bonaparte (1804–1831), son of Louis Bonaparte and Hortense de Beauharnais

Via Oscar I of Sweden, François Clary and Françoise Rose Somis are the ancestors of many European monarchs and princes, including:

- Carl XVI Gustaf of Sweden (b. 1946; r. 1973–present), King of Sweden
- Haakon VIII (b. 1973; r. 2026–present), King of Norway
- Guillaume V, Grand Duke of Luxembourg (b. 1981; r. 2025–present), Grand Duke of Luxembourg
- Philippe of Belgium (b. 1960; r. 2013–present), King of the Belgians
- Frederik X of Denmark (b. 1968; r. 2024–present), King of Denmark
