= Charlotte Bonaparte =

Princess Charlotte
- Infanta of Spain
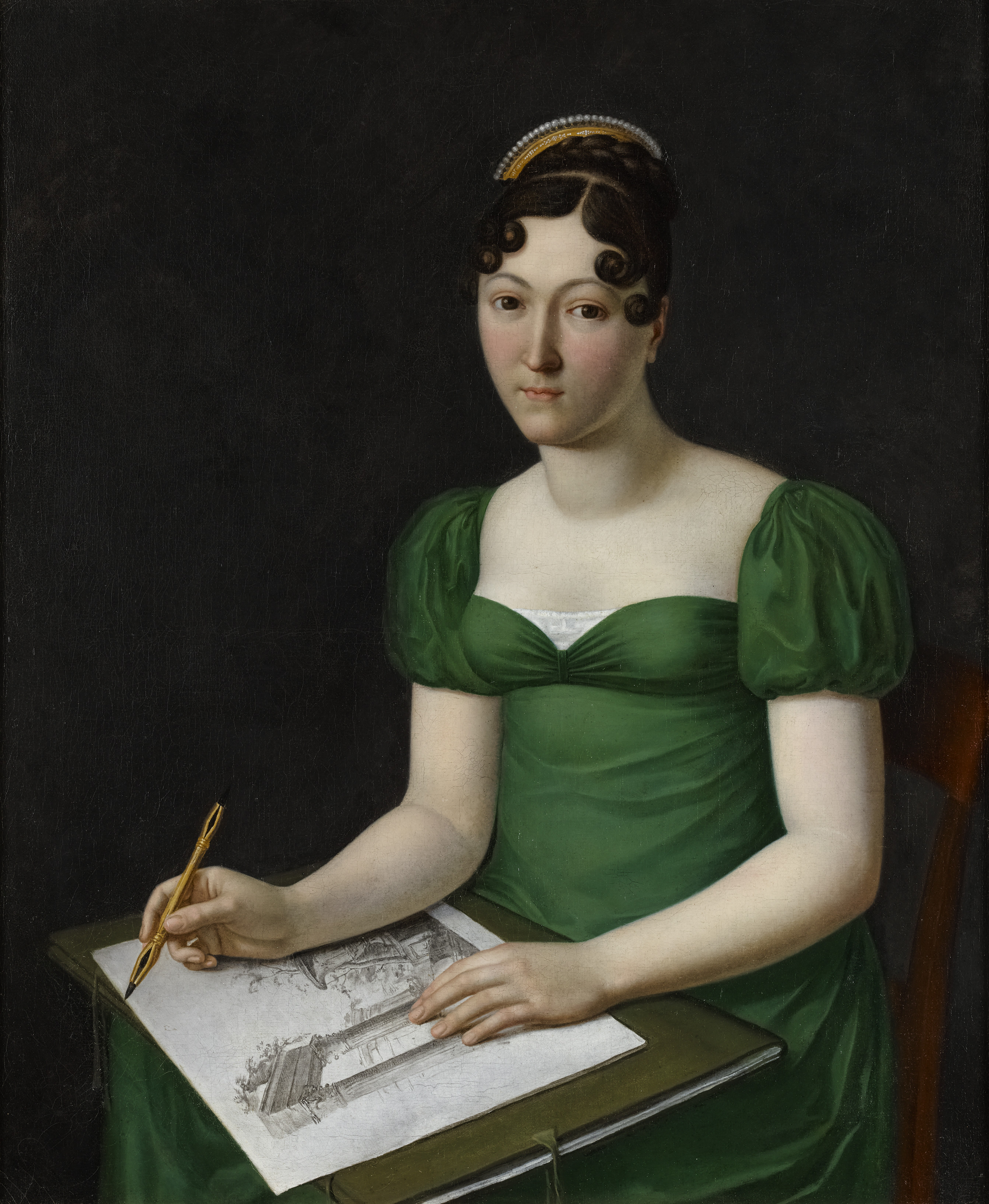
- Charlotte Bonaparte, Self-Portrait, circa 1824-1826, Princeton University Art Museum
- Born: 31 October 1802; Paris, France
- Died: 2 March 1839 (aged 36); Sarzana, Sardinia
- Burial: Basilica of Santa Croce, Florence
- Spouse: Napoléon Louis Bonaparte (m. 1826; died 1831)
Names
- Charlotte Napoléone Bonaparte
- House: Bonaparte
- Father: Joseph Bonaparte
- Mother: Julie Clary

Charlotte Napoléone Bonaparte (31 October 1802 – 2 March 1839) was the daughter of Joseph Bonaparte, the older brother of Emperor Napoleon I, and Julie Clary. She was active as an artist.

== Life ==
After the fall of her uncle Emperor Napoleon in 1815, her father moved to America and lived in Philadelphia, Pennsylvania. Charlotte and her sister, however, stayed with their mother in Europe. They lived in Frankfurt and Brussels in 1815-1821, and then in Florence.

She studied engraving and lithography in Paris with the artist Louis Léopold Robert, who is reputed to have fallen in love with her.

Charlotte, known as the Countess de Survilliers, lived with her father at his Point Breeze estate in Bordentown, New Jersey, from December 1821 to August 1824.

Charlotte married her first cousin Napoléon Louis, the second son of Louis Bonaparte and Hortense de Beauharnais, on 23 July 1826. She became a widow in 1831.

=== Artist ===
While in America, she sketched numerous landscapes including Passaic Falls, her father's estate at Point Breeze, the town of Lebanon, and others, some of which were engraved for the book "Picturesque American Scenes" by Joubert. Extant landscape drawings by her include Passaic Falls, a view near Tuckerton, and Schooley's Mountain. She also painted portraits (Cora Monges, 1822; Emilie Lacoste, 1823) and exhibited her work at the Pennsylvania Academy of the Fine Arts.

=== Death ===
Charlotte reportedly died in childbirth. The father of her child was reportedly Count Potocki.

Her tomb is in the Basilica of Santa Croce, Florence, Italy, and it says (paraphrased): Born Oct. 31, 1802, died 1839.

== Legacy ==
Charlotte, her sister Zénaide (1801–1854), and their mother were painted by the French artist François Gérard, while their mother was Queen of Spain. Another French artist, the well-known Jacques-Louis David, painted a portrait of the two sisters; it shows them reading a letter from Philadelphia sent by their father.

== Gallery ==
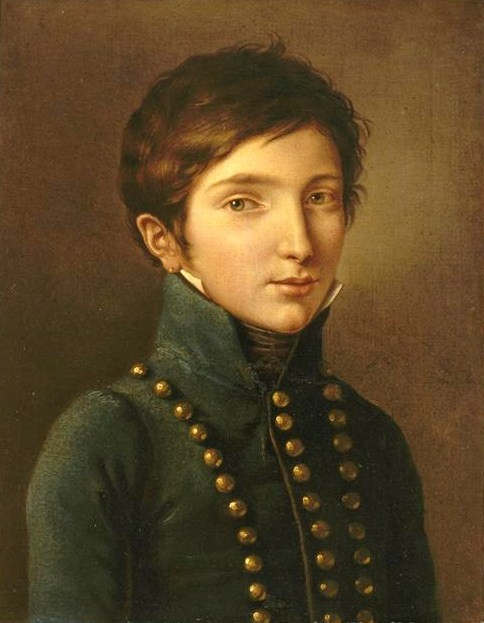
King Napoléon-Louis Bonaparte

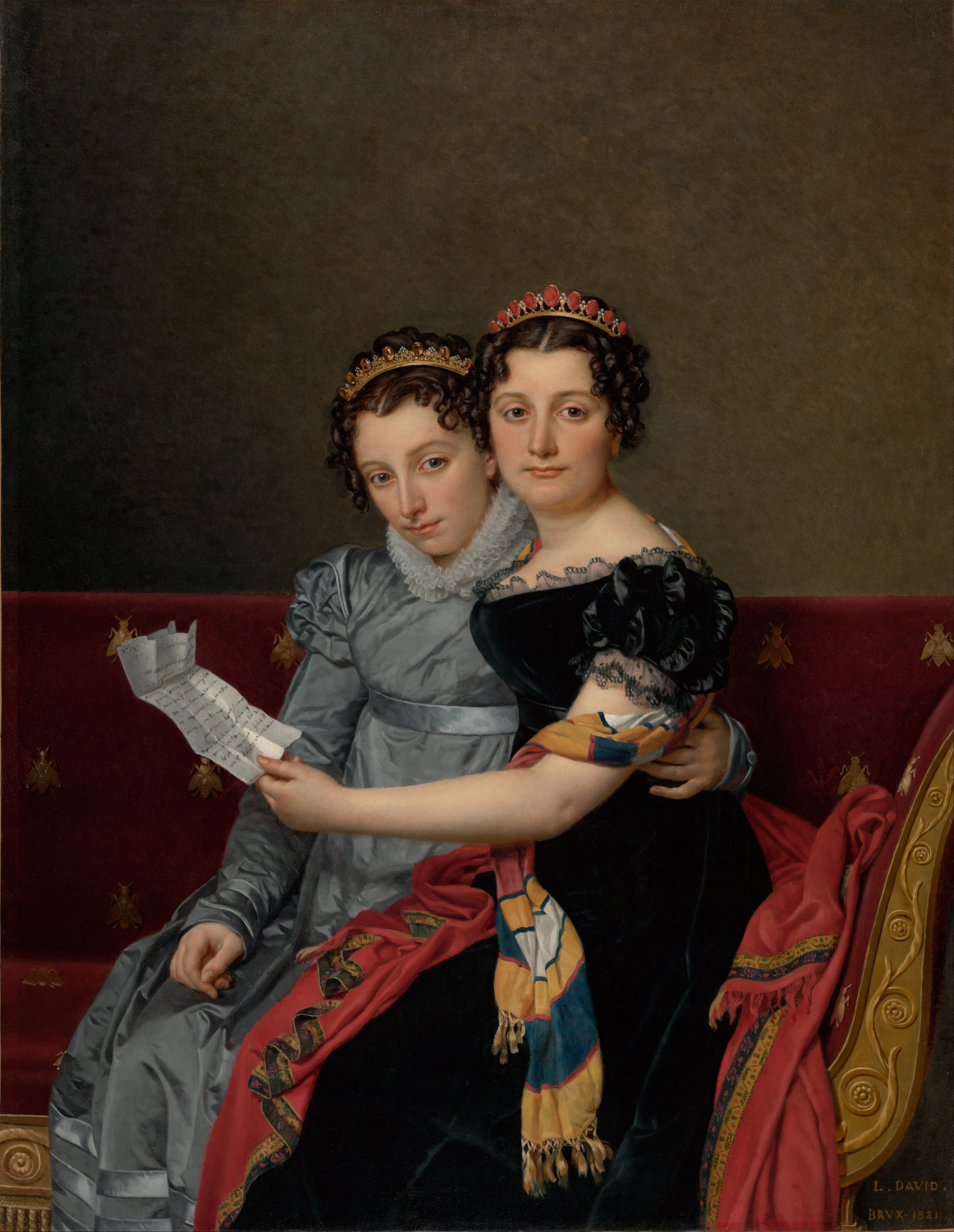
The Sisters Zénaïde and Charlotte Bonaparte by Jacques-Louis David, 1821

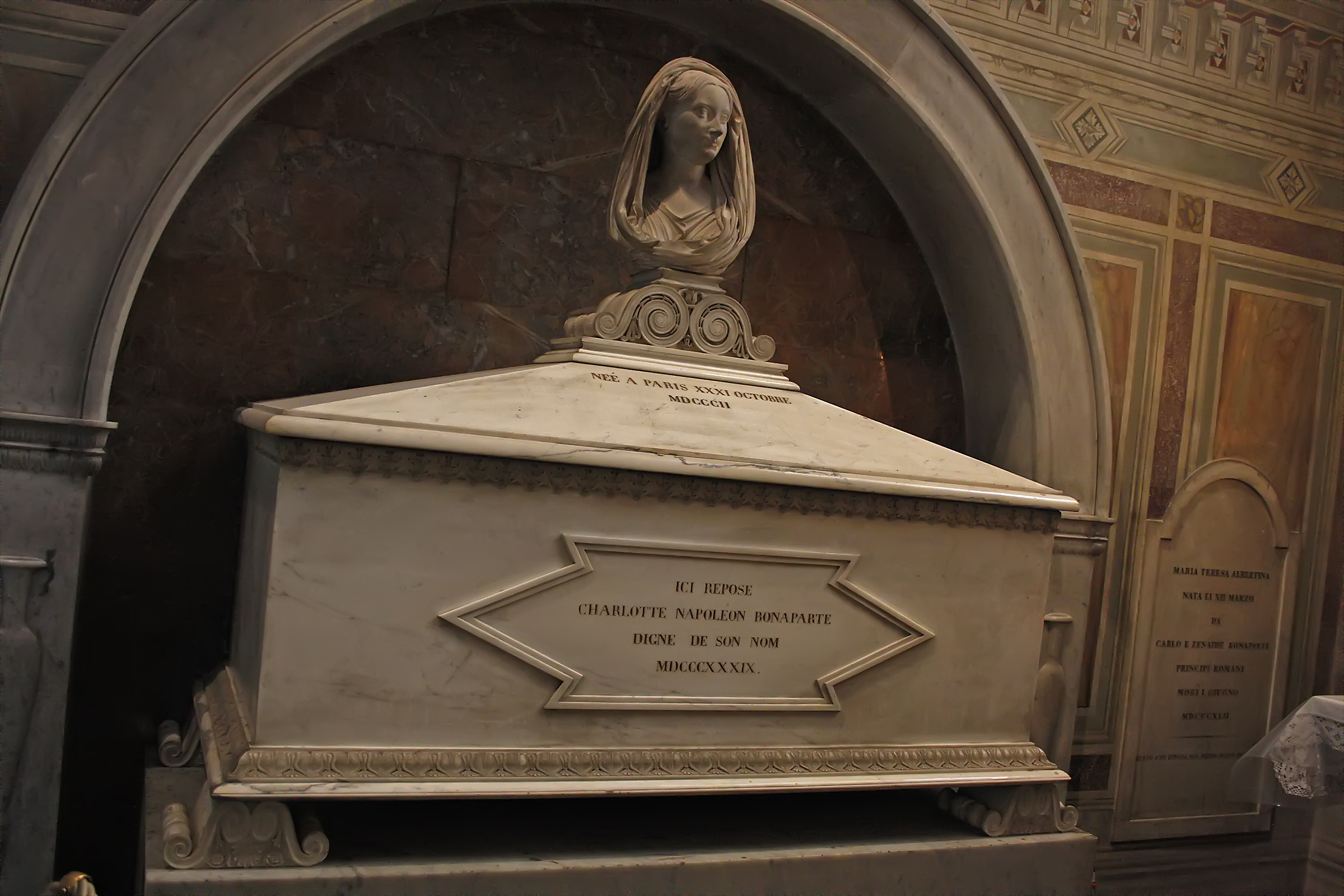
Charlotte Bonaparte's Tomb.

== Ancestry ==
Ancestors of Charlotte Bonaparte

8. Giuseppe Maria Buonaparte
4. Carlo Maria Buonaparte
9. Maria Saveria Paravicini
2. Joseph Bonaparte
10. Giovanni Geronimo Ramolino
5. Maria Letizia Ramolino
11. Angela Maria Pietrasanta
1. Charlotte Napoléone Bonaparte
12. Joseph Clary
6. François Clary
13. Françoise Agnès Ammoric
3. Marie Julie Clary
14. Joseph Ignace Somis
7. Françoise Rose Somis
15. Catherine Rose Soucheiron

== Sources ==
- E. Benezit, Dictionnaire critique et documentaire des Peintres, Sculpteurs, Dessinateurs et Graveurs (1966), vol. 1, p. 754, and vol. 7, p. 279. p 464
- Patricia Tyson Stroud, The Man Who Had Been King: The American Exile of Napoleon's Brother Joseph (Philadelphia: University of Pennsylvania Press, 2005), pp. 88–113.
- William H. Gerdts, Painting and Sculpture in New Jersey (Princeton, NJ: Van Nostrand, 1964), p. 56.
- Thomas Busciglio-Ritter, 'From Brussels to Point Breeze: Charlotte Bonaparte's Lithographic Landscapes, 1821-25', Print Quarterly, vol. XLII, no. 1 (March 2025), pp. 31-43.
