= The Sisters Zénaïde and Charlotte Bonaparte =

Painting by Jacques-Louis David

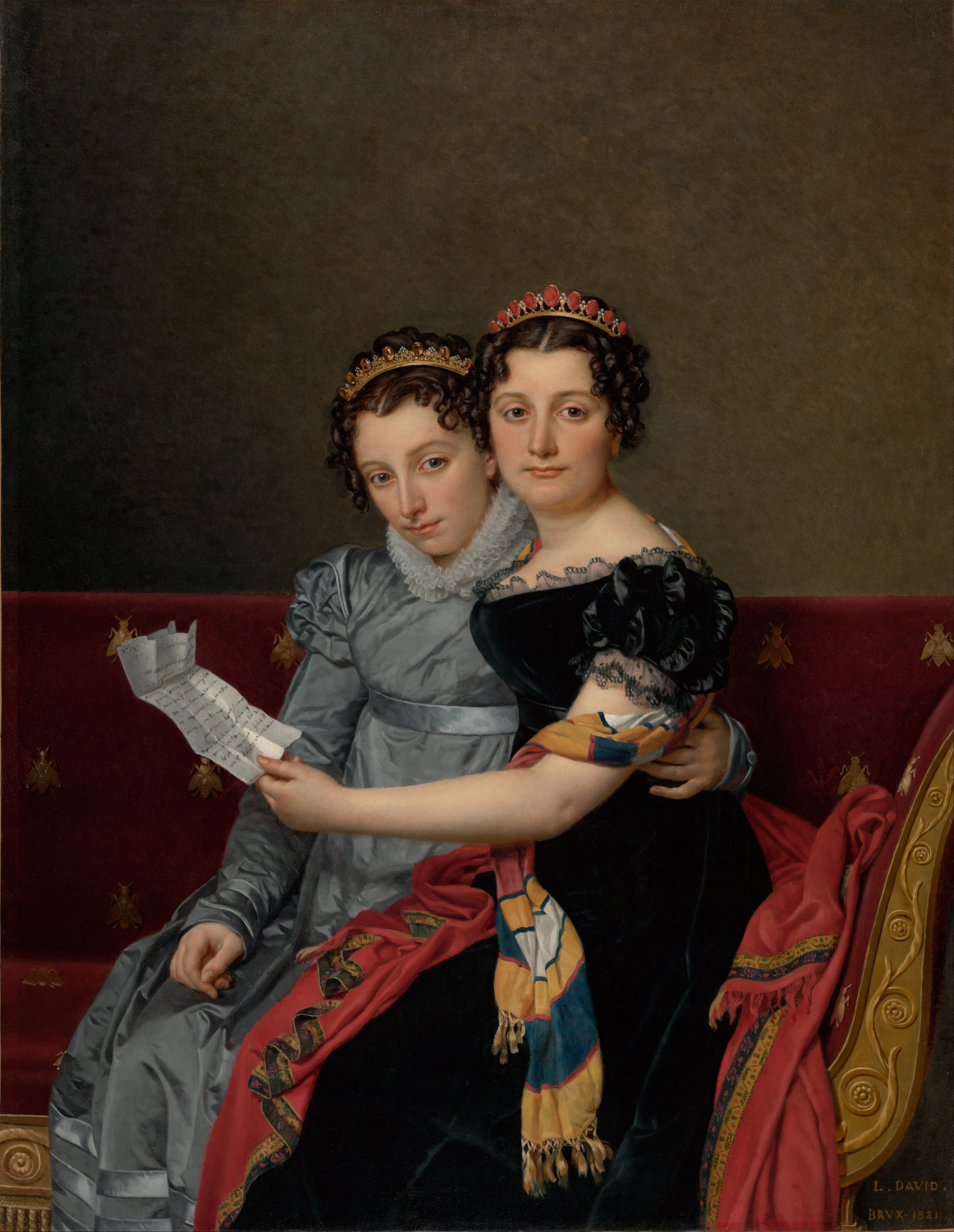
- Artist: Jacques-Louis David
- Year: 1821
- Medium: Oil on canvas
- Dimensions: 129.5 cm × 100.6 cm (50.98 in × 39.60 in)
- Location: Getty Museum; Los Angeles
- Accession: 86.PA.740
- Website: getty.edu/art/collection/object/103RHX

The Sisters Zénaïde and Charlotte Bonaparte is an 1821 portrait painting by the French artist Jacques-Louis David. It is a dual portrait of Charlotte Bonaparte and Zénaïde Bonaparte, the daughters of the former King of Spain, Joseph Bonaparte and his wife Julie Clary. They were the nieces of the deposed French Emperor Napoleon. The painting was created while they were living in Brussels, and it shows them reading a letter from their father in Philadelphia where he had gone after the Battle of Waterloo. It was commissioned by Joseph and shipped to his house in the United States, where it was displayed at the 1823 exhibition of the Pennsylvania Academy of the Fine Arts.

David, a major figure in French painting during the Napoleonic era, had gone into exile in Brussels after the Restoration of the Monarchy in France. He was on friendly terms with the sisters and taught Charlotte drawing. The composition reflects the Empire Style and features a red velvet couch featuring golden bees, the emblem of the Bonaparte dynasty. Today, the painting is in the collection of the Getty Museum in Los Angeles, having been acquired in 1986

== See also ==
- List of paintings by Jacques-Louis David

== Bibliography ==
- Bordes, Phillipe. Jacques-Louis David: Empire to Exile. Yale University Press, 2007.
- Fredericksen, Burton B. Masterpieces of Painting in the J. Paul Getty Museum: Second Edition. Getty Publications, 1988.
- Stroud, Patricia Tyson. The Man Who Had Been King: The American Exile of Napoleon's Brother Joseph. University of Pennsylvania Press, 2014.
