= Joseph Bonaparte =

King of Naples (1806–08) and Spain (1808–13)

Joseph I
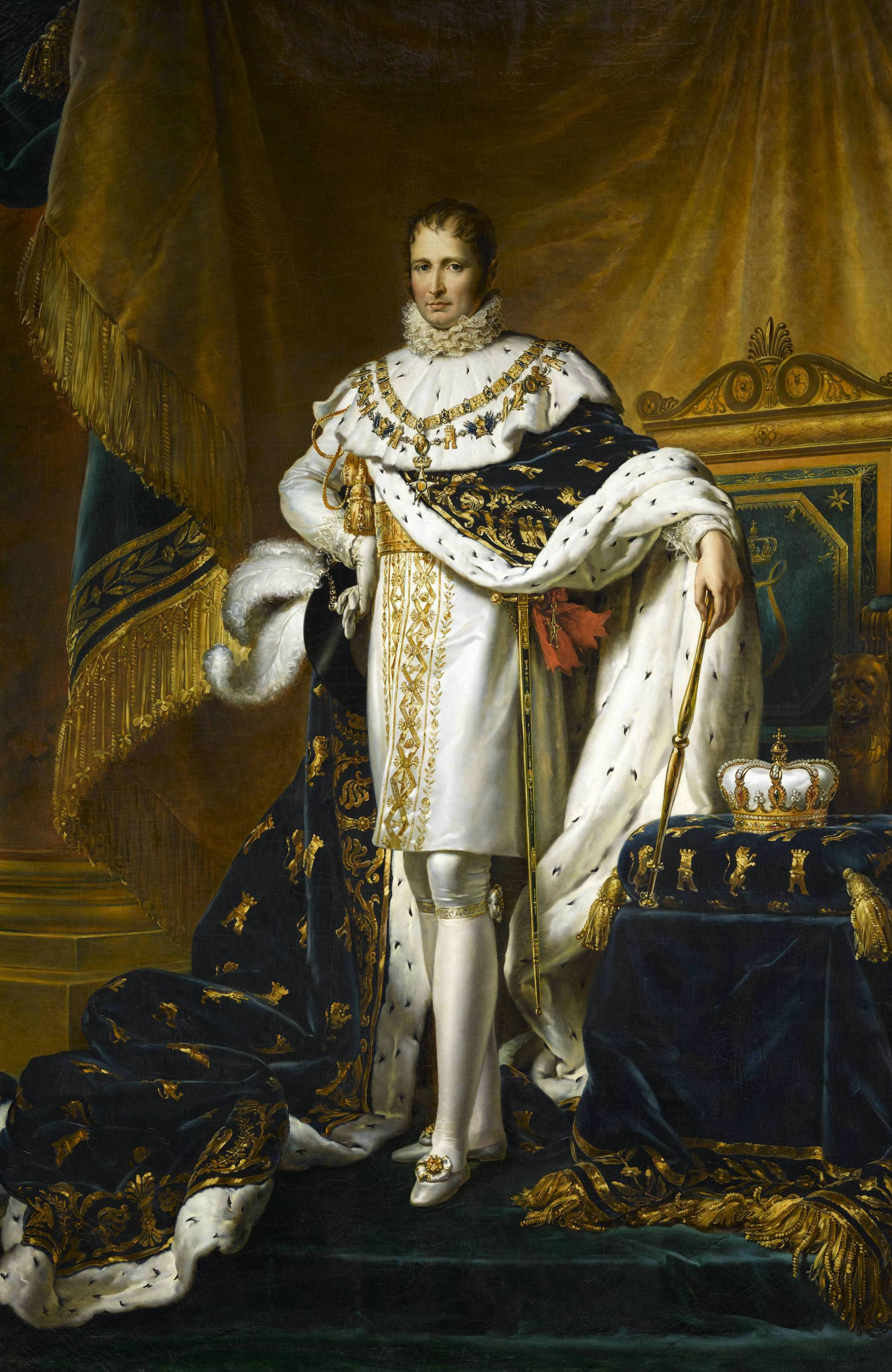
- Portrait of Joseph Bonaparte, 1808

King of Spain and the Indies
- Reign: 6 June 1808 – 11 December 1813
- Predecessor: Ferdinand VII
- Successor: Ferdinand VII

King of Naples
- Reign: 30 March 1806 – 6 June 1808
- Predecessor: Ferdinand IV
- Successor: Joachim-Napoleon

Head of the House of Bonaparte
- Tenure: 22 July 1832 – 28 July 1844
- Predecessor: Napoleon II
- Successor: Louis, Count of Saint-Leu
- Born: Giuseppe di Buonaparte; 7 January 1768; Corte, Corsica, Republic of Genoa
- Died: 28 July 1844 (aged 76); Florence, Grand Duchy of Tuscany
- Burial: Hôtel des Invalides
- Spouse: Julie Clary (m. 1794)
- Issue among others: Zénaïde, Princess of Canino and Musignano; Charlotte Napoléone Bonaparte
- House: Bonaparte
- Father: Carlo Buonaparte
- Mother: Letizia Ramolino

Joseph Bonaparte (born Giuseppe di Buonaparte, Italian: [dʒuˈzɛppe di ˌbwɔnaˈparte]; Corsican: Ghjuseppe Bonaparte; Spanish: José Bonaparte; 7 January 1768 – 28 July 1844), regnal name José I, was a French statesman, lawyer, diplomat and older brother of Napoleon Bonaparte. In 1806, Napoleon made him King of Naples, and then King of Spain and the Indies in 1808. After the fall of Napoleon, Joseph styled himself Comte de Survilliers and emigrated to the United States, where he lived in the Point Breeze estate at Bordentown, New Jersey.

== Early life and career ==
Joseph was born in 1768 as Giuseppe Buonaparte to Carlo Buonaparte and Maria Letizia Ramolino at Corte, the capital of the Corsican Republic. In the year of his birth, Corsica was invaded by France and conquered the following year. His father was originally a follower of the Corsican patriot leader Pasquale Paoli, but later became a supporter of French rule.

Bonaparte trained as a lawyer. In that role and as a politician and diplomat, he served in the Council of Five Hundred and as the French ambassador to the Papal States. In 1799, he used his position as member of the Council of Five Hundred to help his brother Napoleon to overthrow the Directory. On 30 September 1800, as Minister Plenipotentiary, he signed the Treaty of Mortefontaine, treaty of friendship and commerce between France and the United States, alongside Charles Pierre Claret de Fleurieu, and Pierre Louis Roederer.

== King of Naples ==
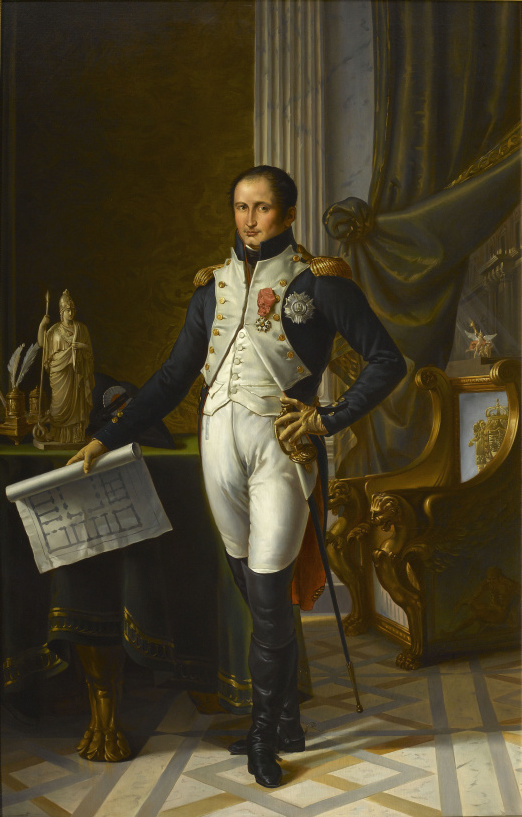
Portrait of Joseph Bonaparte, King of Naples by Jean-Baptiste Wicar

Upon the outbreak of war between France and Austria in 1805, Ferdinand IV of Naples had agreed to a treaty of neutrality with Napoleon I but, a few days later, declared his support for Austria. He permitted a large Anglo-Russian force to land in his kingdom. Napoleon, however, was soon victorious. After the War of the Third Coalition was shattered on 5 December at the Battle of Austerlitz, Ferdinand was subject to Napoleon's wrath.

On 27 December 1805, Napoleon issued a proclamation from the Schönbrunn declaring Ferdinand to have forfeited his kingdom. He said that a French invasion would soon follow to ensure that "the finest of countries is relieved from the yoke of the most faithless of men".

On 31 December Napoleon commanded Joseph Bonaparte to move to Rome, where he would be assigned to command the army sent to dispossess Ferdinand of his throne. Although Bonaparte was the nominal commander-in-chief of the expedition, Marshal Masséna was in effective command of operations, with General St. Cyr second. But, St. Cyr, who had previously held the senior command of French troops in the region, soon resigned in protest at being made subordinate to Masséna and left for Paris. An outraged Napoleon ordered St. Cyr to return to his post at once.

On 8 February 1806 the French invasion force of forty-thousand men crossed into Naples. The centre and right of the army under Masséna and General Reynier advanced south from Rome, while Giuseppe Lechi led a force down the Adriatic coast from Ancona. On his brother's recommendation, Bonaparte attached himself to Reynier. The French advance faced little resistance. Even before any French troops had crossed the border, the Anglo-Russian forces had beaten a prudent retreat, the British withdrawing to Sicily, and the Russians to Corfu. Abandoned by his allies, King Ferdinand had also already set sail for Palermo on 23 January. Queen Maria-Carolina lingered a little longer in the capital but, on 11 February, fled to join her husband.

The first obstacle the French encountered was the fortress of Gaeta; its governor, Prince Louis of Hesse-Philippsthal, refused to surrender his charge. There was no meaningful delay of the invaders, as Masséna detached a small force to besiege the garrison before continuing south. Capua opened its gates after only token resistance. On 14 February Masséna took possession of Naples and, the following day, Bonaparte staged a triumphant entrance into the city. Reynier was quickly dispatched to seize control of the Strait of Messina and, on 9 March, inflicted a crushing defeat of the Neapolitan Royal Army at the Battle of Campo Tenese, effectively destroying it as a fighting force and securing the entire mainland for the French.

On 30 March 1806 Napoleon issued a decree installing Joseph Bonaparte as King of Naples and Sicily; the decree said as follows:

"Napoleon, by the Grace of God and the constitutions. Emperor of the French and King of Italy, to all those to whom these presents come, greetings. The interests of our people, the honor of our Crown, and the tranquility of the Continent of Europe requiring that we should assure, in a stable and definite manner, the lot of the people of Naples and of Sicily, who have fallen into our power by the right of conquest, and who constitute a part of the Grand Empire, we declare that we recognize, as King of Naples and of Sicily, our well-beloved brother, Joseph Napoleon, Grand Elector of France. This Crown will be hereditary, by order of primogeniture, in his descendants male, legitimate, and natural, etc."

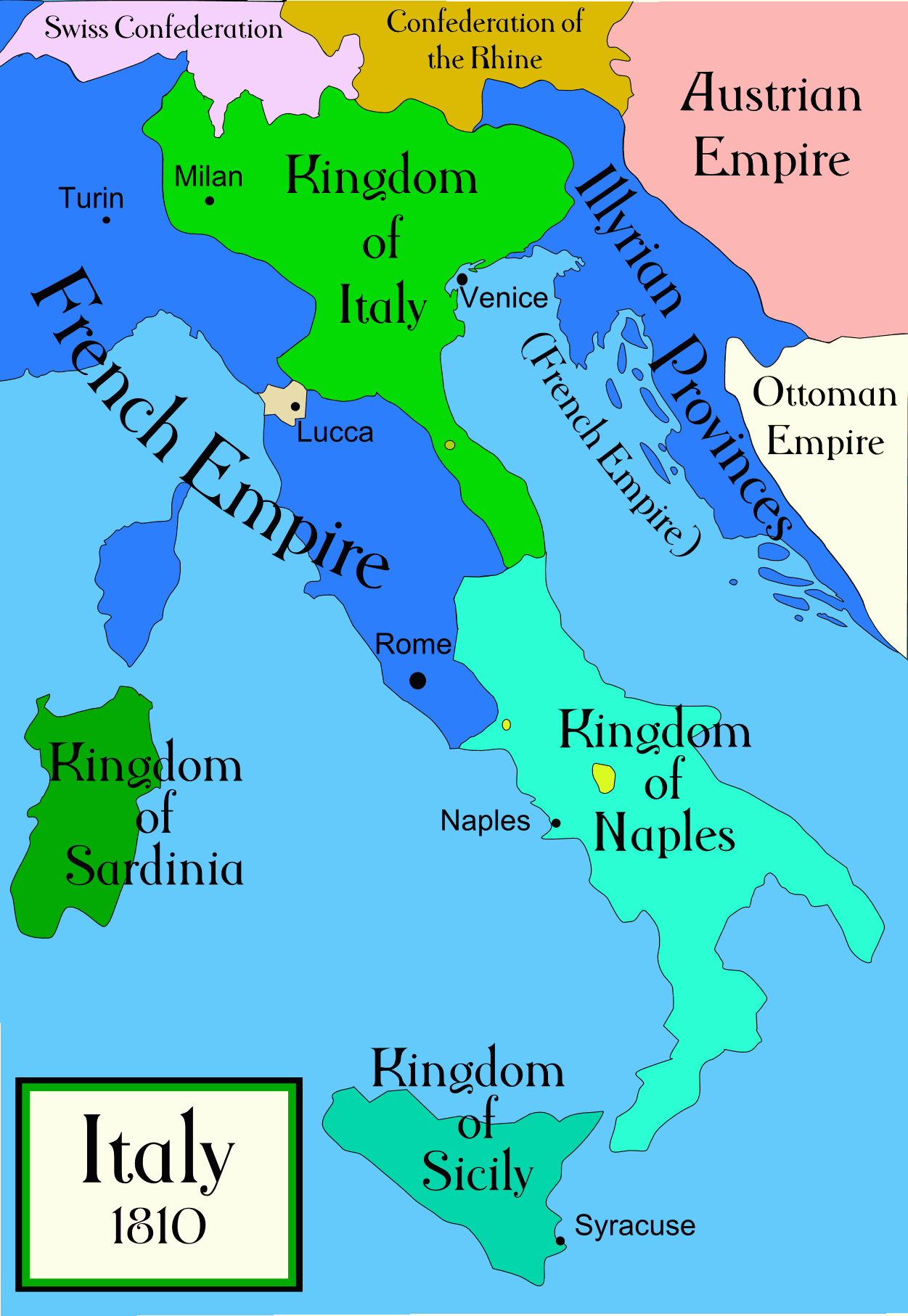
Napoleonic Italy in 1810, with Naples being the same extent under Joseph (1806–1808)

Joseph's arrival in Naples was warmly greeted with cheers and he was eager to be a monarch well liked by his subjects. Seeking to win the favour of the local elites, he maintained in their posts the vast majority of those who had held office and position under the Bourbons and was anxious to not in any way appear a foreign oppressor. With a provisional government set up in the capital, Joseph then immediately set off, accompanied by General Lamarque, on a tour of his new realm. The principal object of the tour was to assess the feasibility of an immediate invasion of Sicily and the expulsion of Ferdinand and Maria-Carolina from their refuge in Palermo. But, upon reviewing the situation at the Strait of Messina, Joseph was forced to admit the impossibility of such an enterprise, the Bourbons having carried off all boats and transports from along the coast and concentrated their remaining forces, alongside the British, on the opposite side. Unable to possess himself of Sicily, Joseph was nevertheless master of the mainland and he continued his progress through Calabria and on to Lucania and Apulia, visiting the main villages and meeting the local notables, clergy and people, allowing his people to grow accustomed to their new king and enabling himself to form first-hand a picture of the condition of his kingdom.

Julie Clary, Queen of Naples, with her daughter Zenaïde Bonaparte in 1807, by Robert Lefèvre

Upon returning to Naples, Bonaparte received a deputation from the French Senate congratulating him upon his accession. The King formed a ministry staffed by many competent and talented men; he was determined to follow a reforming agenda and bring Naples the benefits of the French Revolution, without its excesses. Saliceti was appointed Minister of Police, Roederer Minister of Finance, Miot Minister of the Interior and General Dumas Minister of War. Marshal Jourdan was also confirmed as Governor of Naples, an appointment made by Napoleon, and served as Bonaparte's foremost military adviser.

Bonaparte embarked on an ambitious programme of reform and regeneration, in order to raise Naples to the level of a modern state in the mould of Napoleonic France. Monastic orders were suppressed, their property nationalised, and their funds confiscated to steady the royal finances. Feudal privileges and taxes were abolished; however, the nobility was compensated by an indemnity in the form of a certificate that could be exchanged in return for lands nationalised from the Church. Provincial intendants were instructed to engage those dispossessed former monks who were willing to work in public education, and to ensure that elderly monks no longer able to support themselves could move into communal establishments founded for their care. A college for the education of young girls was established in each province. A central college was founded at Aversa for the daughters of public functionaries, and the ablest from the provincial schools, to be admitted under the personal patronage of Queen Julie.

The practice of forcibly recruiting prisoners into the army was abolished. To suppress and control robbers in the mountains, military commissions were established with the power to judge and execute, without appeal, all those brigands arrested with arms in their possession. Public works programmes were begun to provide employment to the poor and invest in improvements to the kingdom. Highways were built to Reggio. The project of a Calabrian road was completed under Bonaparte within the year after decades of delay. In the second year of his reign, Bonaparte installed the first system of public street-lighting in Naples, modelled on that operating in Paris.

Although the kingdom was not at that time furnished with a constitution, and thus Joseph's will as monarch reigned supreme, there is yet no instance of him ever adopting a measure of policy without prior discussion of the matter in the Council of State and the passing of a majority vote in favour his course of action by the counsellors. Joseph thus presided over Naples in the best traditions of Enlightened absolutism, doubling the revenue of the crown from seven to fourteen million ducats in his brief two-year reign while all the time seeking to lighten the burdens of his people rather than increase them.

Joseph ruled Naples for two years before being replaced by his sister's husband, Joachim Murat. Joseph was then made King of Spain in August 1808, soon after the French invasion.

== King of Spain and the Indies ==
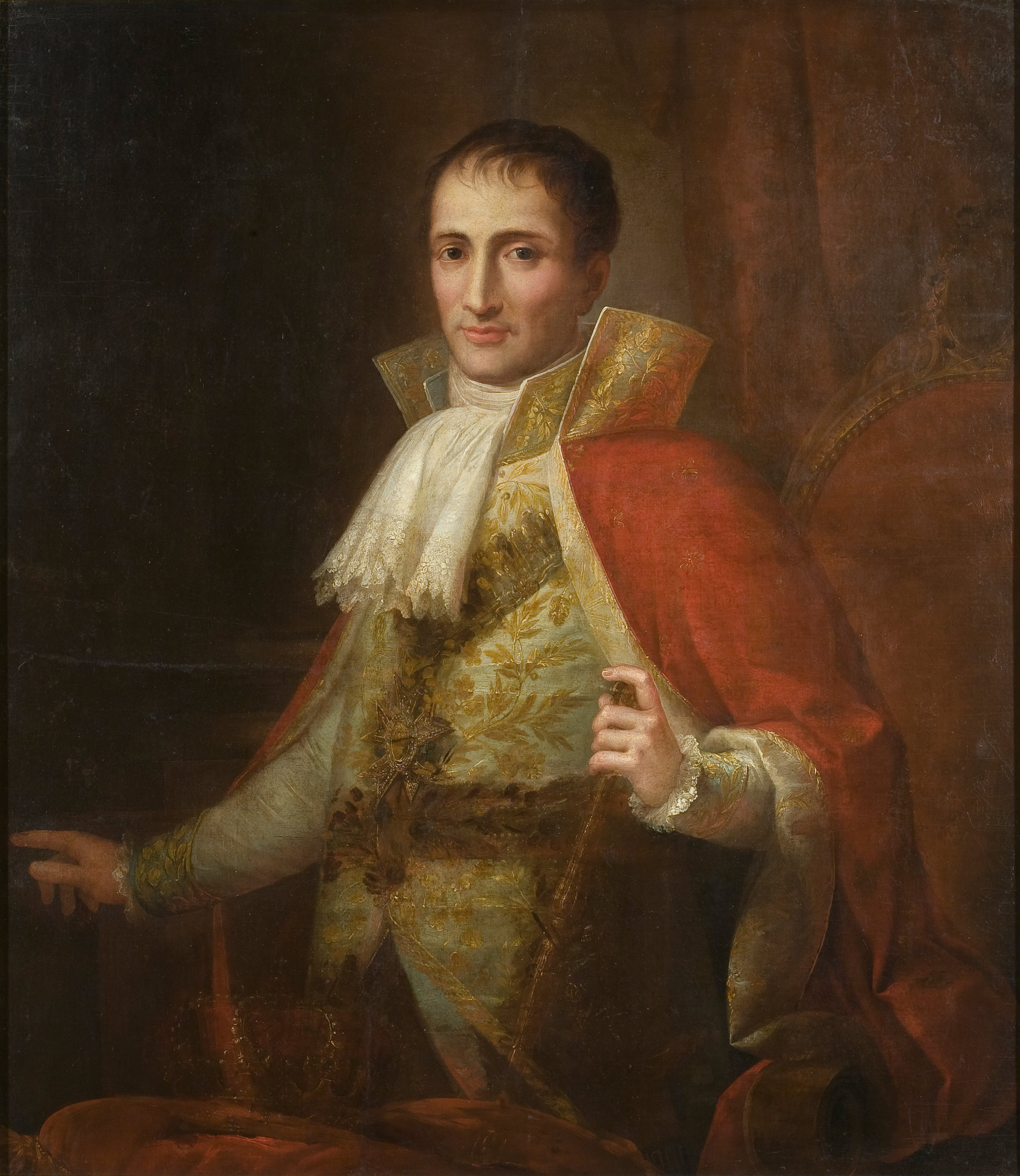
Portrait by Joseph Flaugier, c. 1809

Coat of arms as King of Naples

Coat of arms as King of Spain

Royal monogram as King of Spain

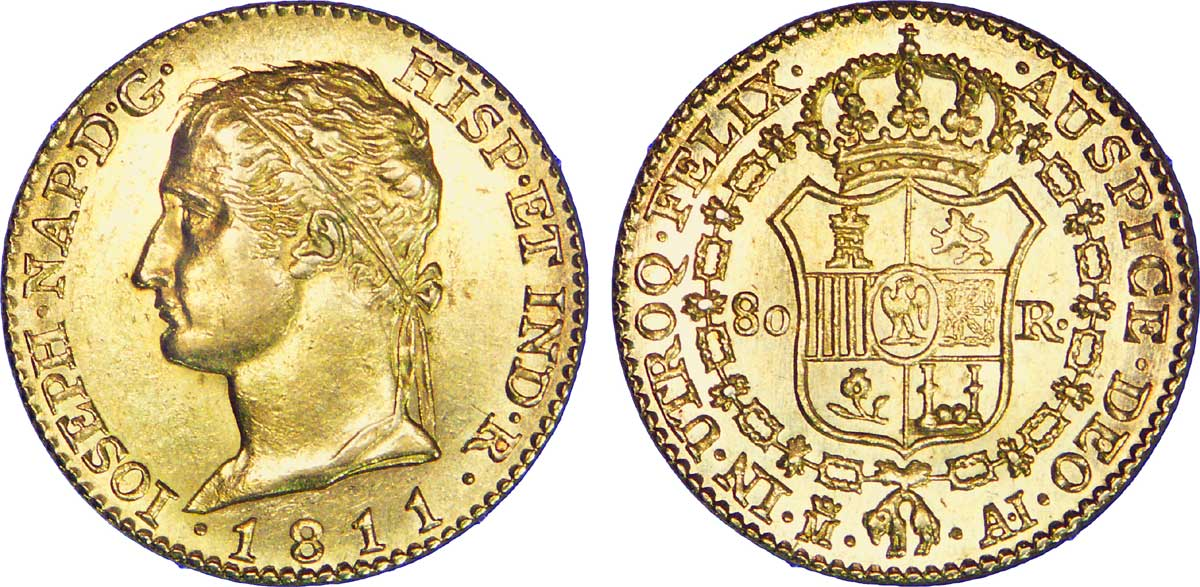
Spanish gold coin from 1811

Joseph somewhat reluctantly left Naples, where he was popular, and arrived in Spain, where he was extremely unpopular. Joseph came under heavy fire from his opponents in Spain, who tried to smear his reputation by calling him Pepe Botella (Joe Bottle) for his alleged heavy drinking, an accusation echoed by later Spanish historiography, despite the fact that Joseph was abstemious. His arrival as a foreign sovereign sparked a massive Spanish revolt against French rule, and the beginning of the Peninsular War. Thompson says the Spanish revolt was, "a reaction against new institutions and ideas, a movement for loyalty to the old order: to the hereditary crown of the Most Catholic kings, which Napoleon, an excommunicated enemy of the Pope, had put on the head of a Frenchman; to the Catholic Church persecuted by republicans who had desecrated churches, murdered priests, and enforced a loi des cultes (law of religion); and to local and provincial rights and privileges threatened by an efficiently centralized government.

Joseph temporarily retreated with much of the French Army to northern Spain. Feeling himself in an ignominious position, Joseph then proposed his own abdication from the Spanish throne, hoping that Napoleon would sanction his return to the Neapolitan Throne he had formerly occupied. Napoleon dismissed Joseph's misgivings out of hand, and to back up the raw and ill-trained levies he had initially allocated to Spain, the Emperor sent heavy French reinforcements to assist Joseph in maintaining his position as King of Spain. Despite the easy recapture of Madrid, and nominal control by Joseph's government over many cities and provinces, Joseph's reign over Spain was always tenuous at best, and was plagued with near-constant conflict with pro-Bourbon guerrillas. Joseph and his supporters never established complete control over the country, and after a series of failed military campaigns, he would eventually abdicate the throne.

King Joseph's Spanish supporters were called josefinos or afrancesados (frenchified). During his reign, he ended the Spanish Inquisition, partly because Napoleon was at odds with Pope Pius VII at the time. Despite such efforts to win popularity, Joseph's foreign birth and support, plus his membership of a Masonic lodge, virtually guaranteed he would never be accepted as legitimate by the bulk of the Spanish people. During Joseph's rule of Spain, Venezuela declared independence from Spain. The king had virtually no influence over the course of the ongoing Peninsular War: Joseph's nominal command of French forces in Spain was mostly illusory, as the French commanders theoretically subordinate to King Joseph insisted on checking with Napoleon before carrying out Joseph's instructions.

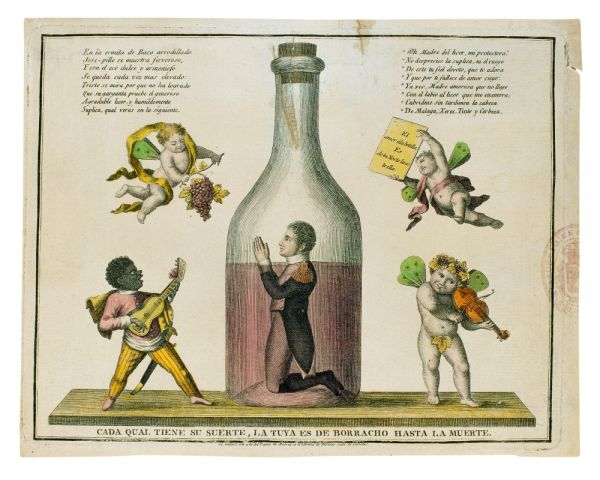
Spanish caricature about Bonaparte falsely alleged alcoholism.

King Joseph abdicated the Spanish throne and returned to France after the main French forces were defeated by a British-led coalition at the Battle of Vitoria in 1813. During the closing campaign of the War of the Sixth Coalition, Napoleon I left his brother to govern Paris with the title Lieutenant General of the Empire. As a result, he was again in nominal command of the French Imperial Army that was defeated at the Battle of Paris.

He was seen by some Bonapartists as the rightful Emperor of the French after the death of Napoleon's own son Napoleon II in 1832, although he did little to advance his claim.

== Later life in the United States and Europe ==
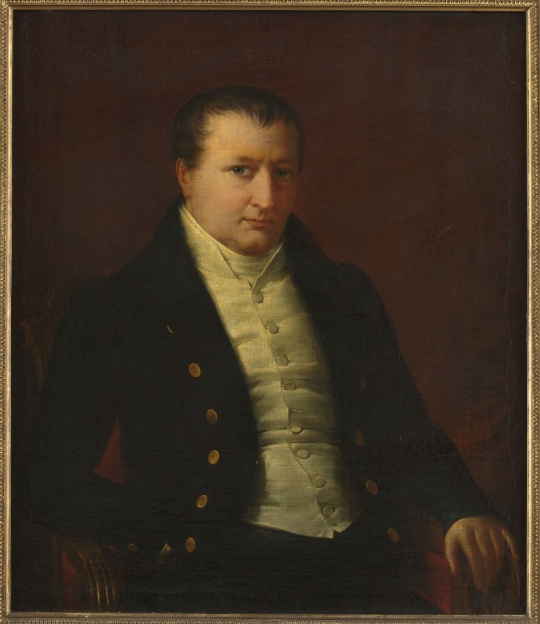
King Joseph at Point Breeze, portrait painted on 2 February 1832 by the French artist Innocent-Louis Goubaud, during a visit to Bonaparte at his estate in New Jersey

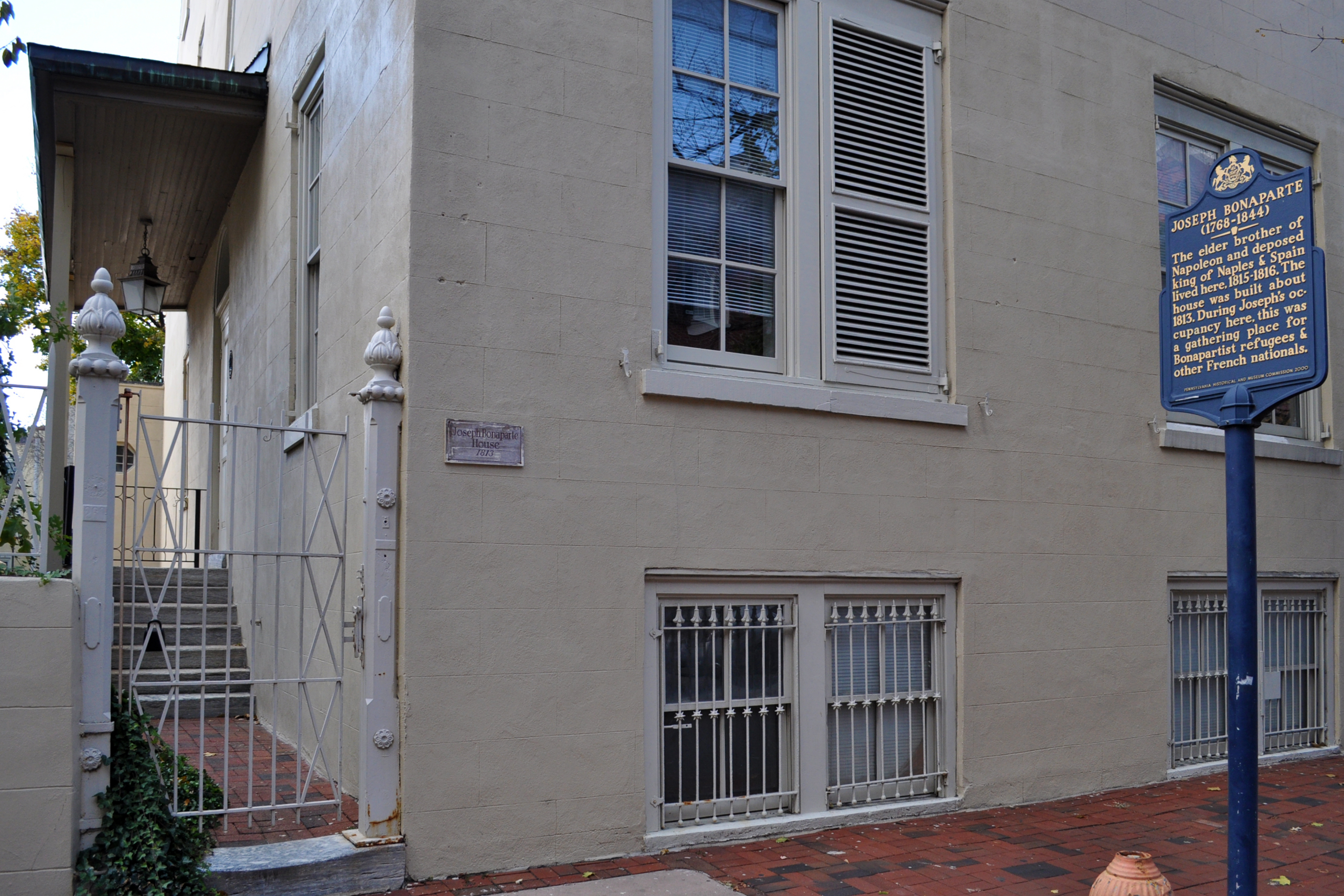
Joseph Bonaparte Historical Marker at 260 S 9th St Philadelphia PA

Bonaparte travelled to the United States onboard the Commerce under the name of M. Bouchard. British naval officers had searched the vessel three times but never found Bonaparte on board and the ship arrived on 15 July 1815. In the period 1817–1832, Bonaparte lived primarily in the United States (where he sold the jewels he had taken from Spain). He first settled in New York City and Philadelphia, where his house became the centre of activity for French emigres. In 1823, he was elected as a member to the American Philosophical Society. Later he purchased an estate, called Point Breeze, formerly owned by Stephen Sayre; it was in Bordentown, New Jersey, on the east side of the Delaware River. He considerably expanded Sayre's home and created extensive gardens in the picturesque style. When his first home was destroyed by fire in January 1820, he constructed a second, grander, house. On completion, it was viewed as the "second-finest house in America" after the White House. At Point Breeze, Bonaparte entertained many of the leading intellectuals and politicians of his day.

In the summer of 1825, the Quaker scientist Reuben Haines III described Bonaparte's estate at Point Breeze, in a letter to his cousin:

I partook of royal fare on solid silver and attended by six waiters who supplied me with 9 courses of the most delicious viands, many of which I could not possibly tell what they were composed of; spending the intermediate time in Charles' private rooms looking over the Herbarium and Portfolios of the Princess, or riding with her and the Prince drawn by two Elegant Horses along the ever varying roads of the park amidst splendid Rhododendrons on the margin of the artificial lake on whose smooth surface gently glided the majestic European swans. Stopping to visit the Aviary enlivened by the most beautiful English pheasants, passing by alcoves ornamented with statues and busts of Parian marble, our course enlivened by the footsteps of the tame deer and the flight of the Woodcock, and when alighting stopping to admire the graceful form of two splendid Etruscan vases of Porphyry 3 ft. high & 2 in diameter presented by the Queen of Sweden [Joseph's sister-in-law Desiree Clary Bernadotte] or ranging [?] through the different appartments of the mansion through a suite of rooms 15 ft. in [height] decorated with the finest productions of the pencils of Coregeo [sic]! Titian! Rubens! Vandyke! Vernet! Tenniers [sic] and Paul Potter and a library of the most splended books I ever beheld.

Another visitor a few years later, British writer Thomas Hamilton, described Bonaparte himself:

Joseph Bonaparte, in person, is about the middle height, but round and corpulent. In the form of his head and features there certainly exists a resemblance to Napoleon, but in the expression of the countenance there is none. I remember, at the Pergola Theatre of Florence, discovering Louis Bonaparte from his likeness to the Emperor, which is very striking, but I am by no means confident that I should have been equally successful with Joseph. There is nothing about him indicative of high intellect. His eye is dull and heavy; his manner ungraceful and deficient in that ease and dignity which we vulgar people are apt to number among the necessary attributes of majesty. **** I am told he converses without any appearance of reserve on the circumstances of his short and troubled reign — if reign, indeed, it can be called — in Spain. He attributes more than half his misfortunes, to the jealousies and intrigues of the unruly marshals, over whom he could exercise no authority. He admits the full extent of his unpopularity, but claims credit for a sincere desire to benefit the people.

Reputedly some Mexican revolutionaries offered to crown Bonaparte as Emperor of Mexico in 1820, but he declined. Mexico gained its independence from Spain in 1821.

In 1832, Bonaparte moved to London, returning to his estate in the United States only intermittently. In 1844, he died in Florence, Italy. His body was returned to France and buried in Les Invalides, in Paris.

== Family ==
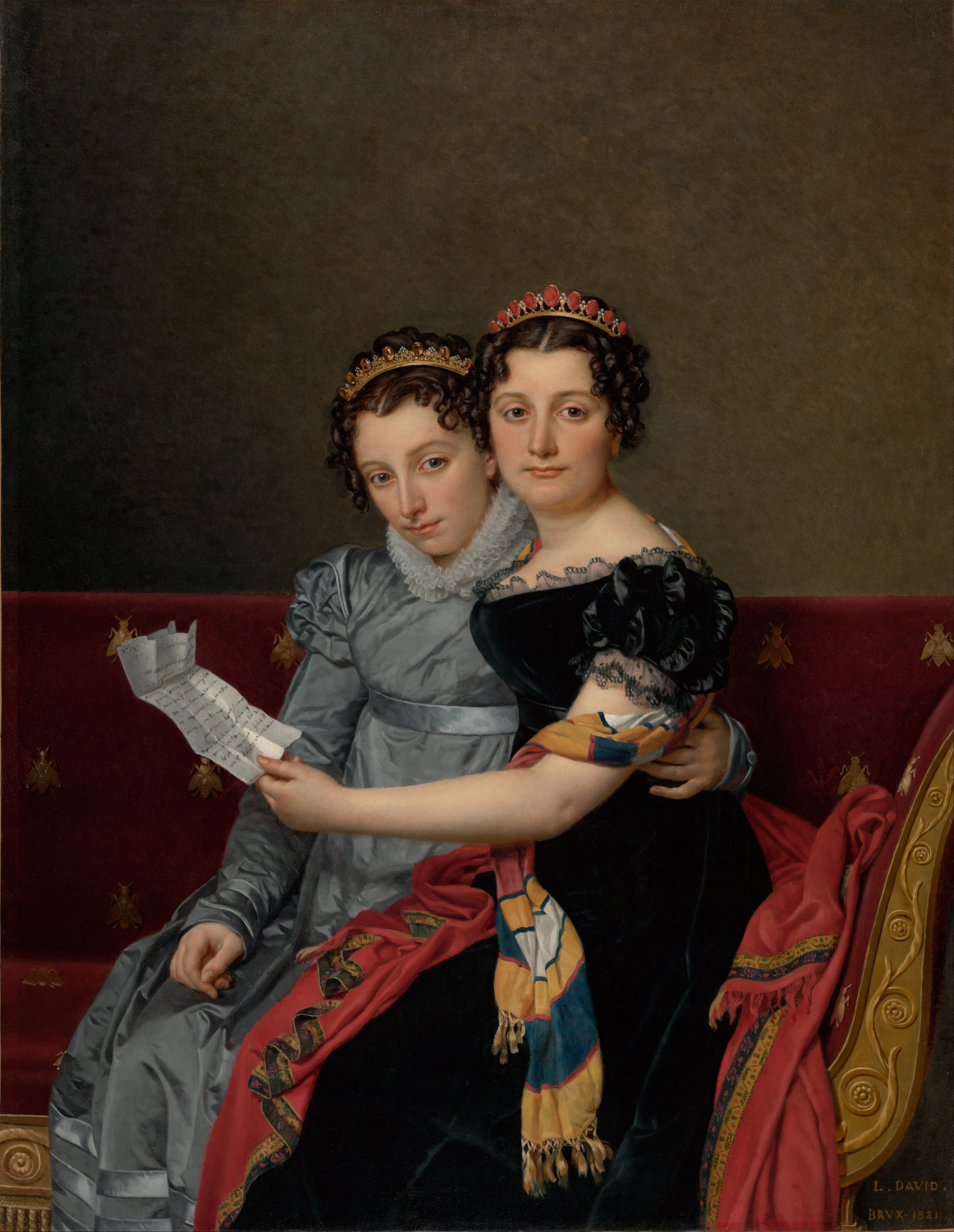
The Sisters Zénaïde and Charlotte Bonaparte by Jacques-Louis David, 1821

Bonaparte married Marie Julie Clary, daughter of François Clary and his wife, on 1 August 1794 in Cuges-les-Pins, France. They had three daughters:

- Julie Joséphine Bonaparte (Genoa, 29 February 1796 – Genoa, 6 June 1797).
- Zénaïde Laetitia Julie Bonaparte (Paris, 8 July 1801 – Naples, 8 August 1854); married in Brussels on 29 June 1822 to Charles Lucien Bonaparte, 2nd Prince of Canino and Musignano (1803–1857).
- Charlotte Napoléone Bonaparte (Paris, 31 October 1802 – Sarzana, 2 March 1839); married in Brussels on 23 July 1826 to Napoléon Louis Bonaparte (1804–1831), formerly King of Holland and Grand Duke of Berg, without issue.

He identified the two surviving daughters as his heirs.

He also fathered two children with Maria Giulia Colonna, Countess of Atri.

- Giulio (9 September 1807 – 1836), unmarried and without issue.
- Teresa (30 September/29 October 1808 – died in infancy).

Bonaparte had two American daughters born at Point Breeze, his estate in Bordentown, New Jersey, by his mistress, Annette Savage of Philadelphia, Pennsylvania ("Madame de la Folie"):

- Pauline Josephann Holton (1819 – 6 December 1823).
- Caroline Charlotte Delafolie (New Jersey, (Note: Also listed as New York or Philadelphia) 1822 – 25 December 1890); married Colonel Zebulon Howell Benton (27 January 1811 – 16 May 1893) of Jefferson County, New York, and had four daughters and three sons.

Bonaparte had two more sons by Émilie (Hémart) Lacoste, wife of Félix Lacoste, founder of the Courrier des États-Unis. (Émilie would also later be the mistress of Prosper Mérimée.) The boys were recorded as the sons of Lacoste.

- Félix-Joseph-François Lacoste (Philadelphia, Pennsylvania, 22 March 1825 - Paris, 1859 or Neuilly, 15 February 1922), married in Metz on 28 March 1857 Isabelle de Gerando (? – 1878), and had two sons.
- a son Lacoste (Philadelphia, Pennsylvania, 22 March 1825 – died young)

== Freemasonry ==
Joseph Bonaparte was admitted to Marseille's lodge la Parfaite Sincérité in 1793. He was asked by his brother Napoleon to monitor freemasonry as Grand Master of the Grand Orient of France (1804–1815). He founded the Grand Lodge National of Spain (1809). With Cambacérès, he encouraged the post-Revolution rebirth of the Freemasonry Order in France.

== Legacy ==
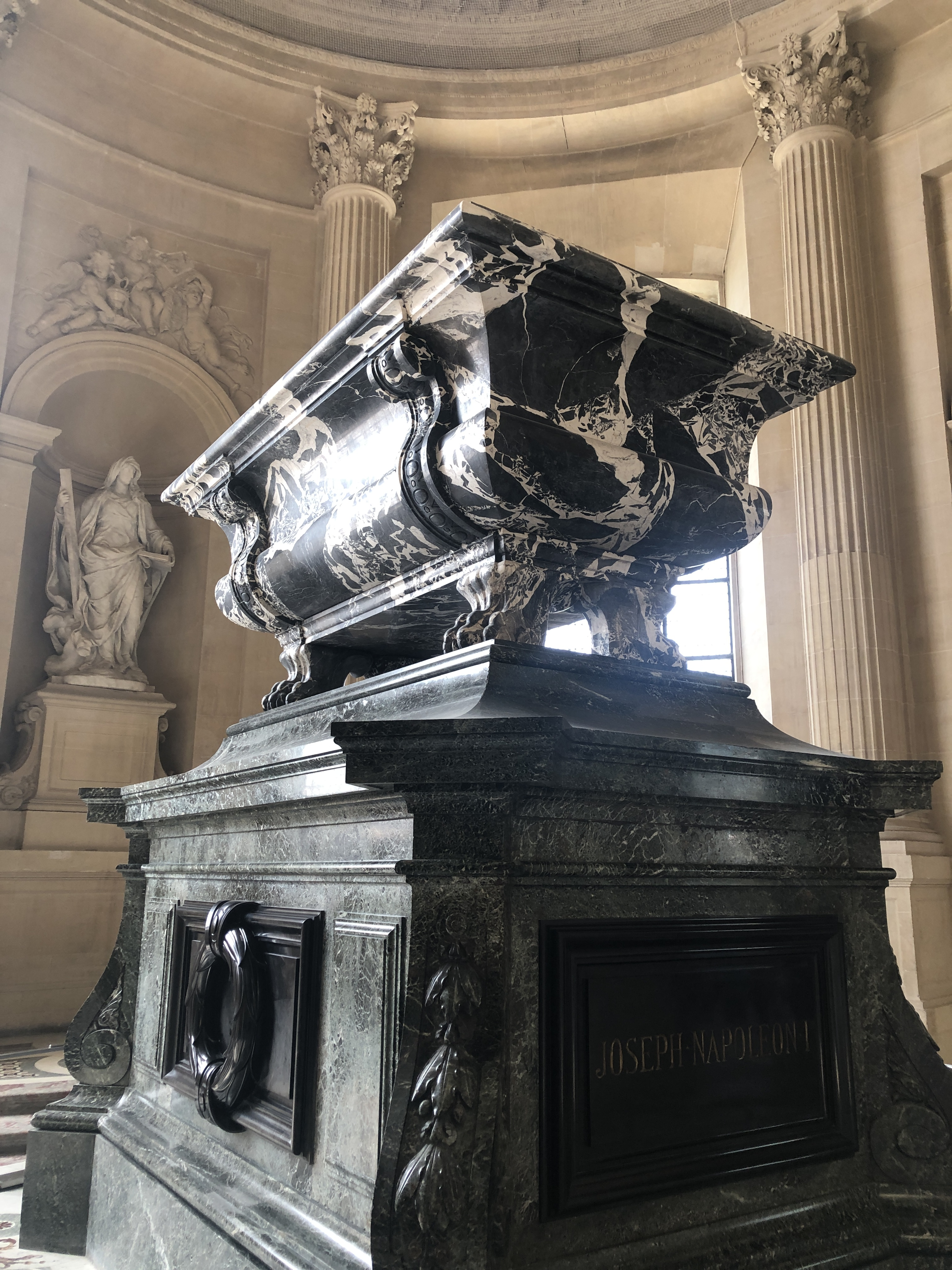
Joseph's tomb at Les Invalides

- Joseph Bonaparte Gulf in the Northern Territory of Australia is named after him.
- Lake Bonaparte, located in the town of Diana, New York, United States, is also named after him.

== Representation in other media ==
- The romantic web among Joseph Bonaparte, Napoleon, Jean-Baptiste Bernadotte, Julie Clary, and Désirée Clary was the subject of the novel Désirée (1951), by Annemarie Selinko.
- The novel was adapted as a film of the same name, Désirée (1954), with Cameron Mitchell as Joseph Bonaparte.

== See also ==
- Bayonne Statute

== Notes ==
Joseph Bonaparte House of Bonaparte Born: 7 January 1768 Died: 28 July 1844
Regnal titles
Preceded by Ferdinand IV	King of Naples; 1806–1808	Succeeded by Joachim I
Preceded by Ferdinand VII	King of Spain; 1808–1813	Succeeded by Ferdinand VII
Titles in pretence
Preceded by Napoléon II	— TITULAR — Emperor of the French; King of Italy; 22 July 1832 – 28 July 1844	Succeeded by Louis I
