= Jerome Blatz =

American lawyer and politician

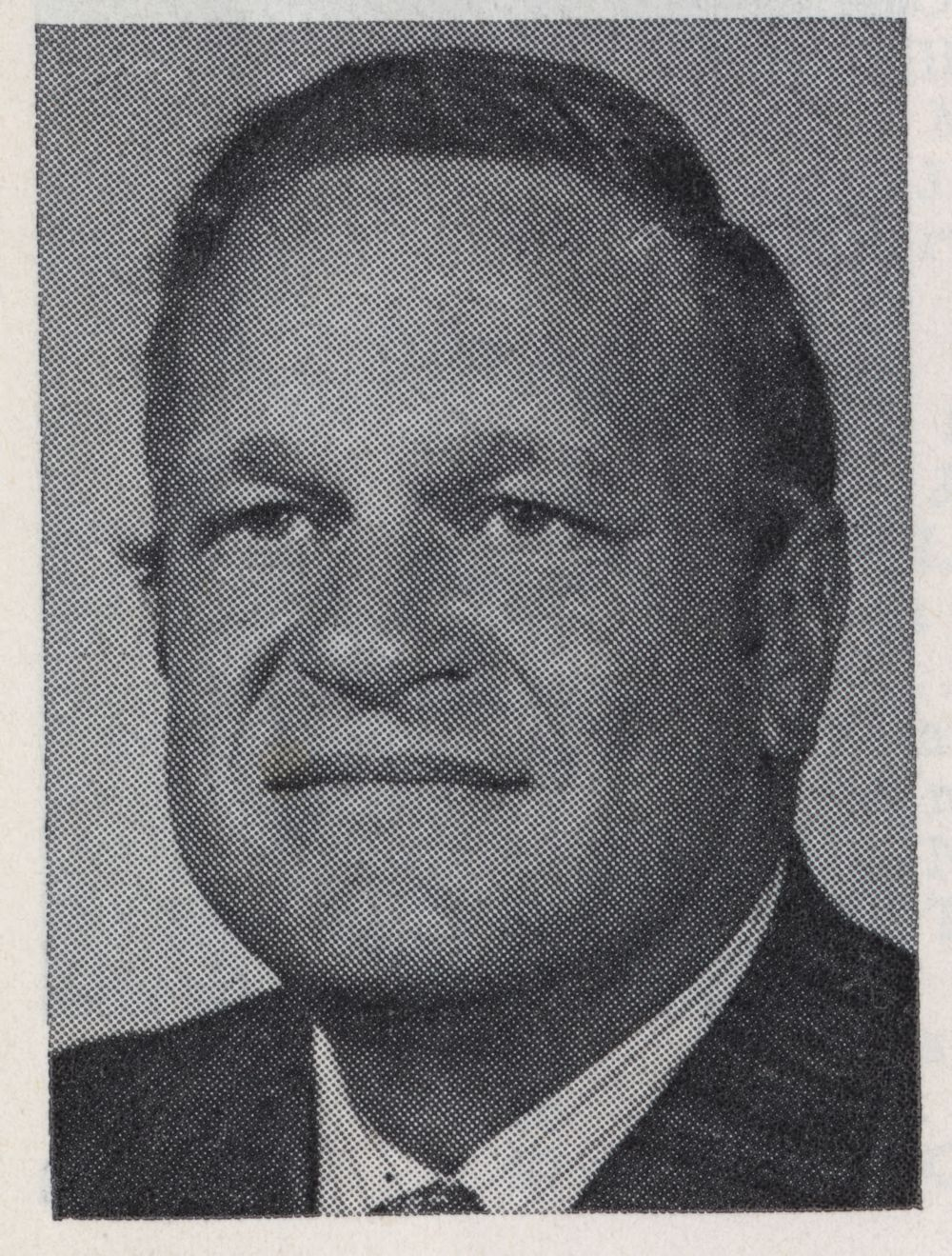
- Born: December 26, 1923; Bloomington, Minnesota, US
- Died: August 20, 2009 (aged 85)
- Education: University of Notre Dame (BA); Harvard University (LLB)
- Occupations: lawyer, legislator
- Known for: State legislator
- Spouse: Kaye Blatz
- Children: 9; including Kathleen Blatz

Jerome V. Blatz (December 26, 1923 – August 20, 2009) was an American lawyer and politician.

== Early life and education ==
Born in Bloomington, Minnesota, Blatz went to Nazareth Hall Prep School in Roseville, Minnesota. He received his bachelor's degree from the University of Notre Dame in 1946 and then received his law degree from Harvard Law School.

== Career ==
He served in the United States Navy during the Korean War and was a pilot and weather expert. Blatz practiced law in Bloomington, Minnesota and taught law at the William Mitchell College of Law. He died in a hospital in Edina, Minnesota. He drafted Bloomington, Minnesota's first City Charter as an attorney, and represented Bloomington in the Minnesota Senate from 1963 to 1965 and from 1967 to 1977. Although elected on a non-partisan basis, he was a registered Republican.

Minnesota Senate
| Preceded by Herman J. Kording | Member of the Minnesota Senate from the 32nd district 1963–1967 | Succeeded by Dean Nyquist |
| Preceded by Keith F. Hughes | Member of the Minnesota Senate from the 27th district 1967–1973 | Succeeded by Howard Olson |
| Preceded by Robert J. Tennessen | Member of the Minnesota Senate from the 38th district 1973–1977 | Succeeded by Robert M. Benedict |
