= Louis Léopold Robert =

Swiss painter (1794–1835)

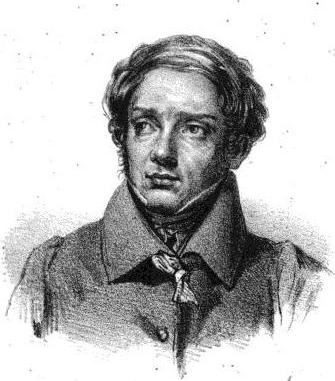
- Born: 13 May 1794; La Chaux-de-Fonds, Principality of Neuchatel
- Died: 20 March 1835 (aged 40); Venice, Kingdom of Lombardy–Venetia (now Italy)
- Known for: Painting

Louis Léopold Robert (13 May 1794 – 20 March 1835) was a Swiss painter.

== Biography ==
Robert was born at La Chaux-de-Fonds (Neuchâtel) in Switzerland, but left his native place with the engraver Jean Girardet at the age of sixteen for Paris.

He was on the eve of obtaining the grand prix for engraving when the events of 1815 blasted his hopes, for Neuchâtel was restored to Prussia, and Robert was struck off the list of competitors as a foreigner. While continuing his studies under Girardet he had never ceased to frequent the studio of David, and he now determined to become a painter, and only returned to his native country when his master himself was exiled. At Neuchâtel he attracted the notice of Roullet de Mezerac, who enabled him by a timely loan to proceed to Rome. In depicting the customs and life of the people, of southern Italy especially, he showed peculiar feeling for the historical characteristics of their race.

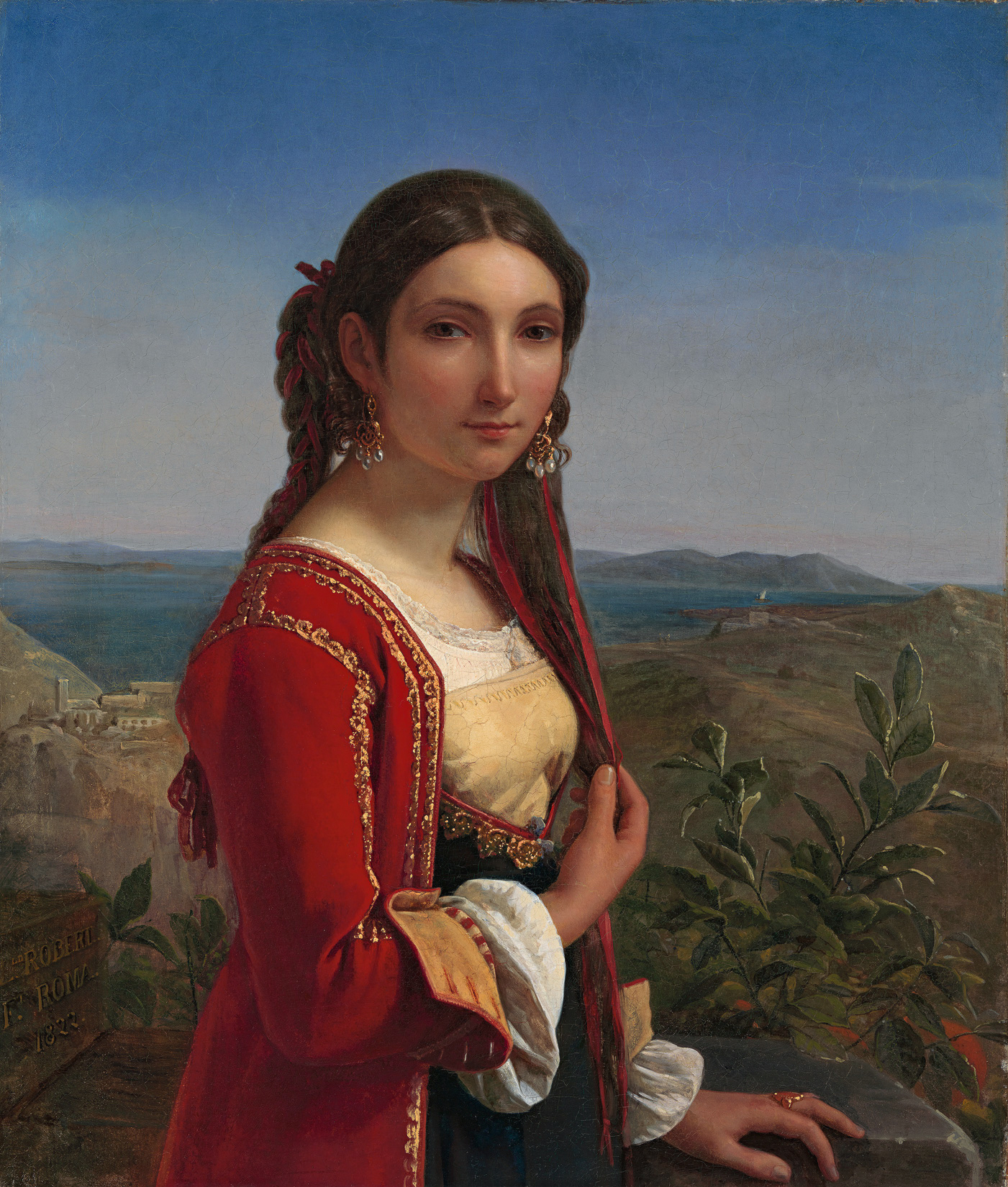
Portrait of a young woman of Retuna by Louis Léopold Robert

After executing many detached studies of Italian life, Robert conceived the idea of painting four great works which should represent at one and the same time the four seasons in Italy and the four leading races of its people. In the Return from the Fête of the Madonna dell'Arco (Louvre) he depicted the Neapolitans and the spring. This picture, exhibited at the Salon of 1827, achieved undoubted success and was bought for the Luxembourg by Charles X; but the work which appeared in 1831, the Summer Reapers arriving in the Pontine Marshe (Louvre), which became the property of Louis Phillippe, established the artist's reputation.

Florence and her autumn vineyards should now have furnished him with his third subject. He attempted to begin it, but, unable to conquer his passion for Princess Charlotte Bonaparte (then mourning the violent death of her husband, Robert's devoted friend), he threw up his work and went to Venice, where he began and carried through the fourth of the series, the Fishers of the Adriatic. This work was not equal to the Reapers. Worn by the vicissitudes of painful feeling, and bitterly discouraged, Robert committed suicide before his easel on 20 March 1835, on the tenth anniversary of the melancholy suicide of a brother to whom he had been much attached. He is buried in the Protestant section of the San Michele cemetery on the island of Isola di San Michele in Venice.

There are a number of references to Robert's paintings in the novel The Count of Monte Cristo by Alexandre Dumas, one being specifically to The Reapers.

== Works ==
- Brigand and His Wife in Prayer
