= Wheelock Whitney Sr. =

Wheelock "Wheels" Whitney Sr. (August 28, 1894 in St. Cloud, Minnesota – March 23, 1957 in Wayzata, Minnesota) was a Republican businessman and scion of a powerful Minnesota family.

== Early life and education ==
He graduated from Phillips Andover Academy in 1913.

== Career ==
His son, Wheelock Jr., was part-owner and president of the Minnesota Vikings football team for a number of years.

== Family history and personal life ==
He married Katherine Kimball in 1922. Their oldest son, Wheelock "Whee" Whitney Jr. was a Minneapolis philanthropist, who was the 1964 Republican nominee for U.S. Senate from Minnesota, losing to Eugene McCarthy, and he was the Republican nominee for governor of Minnesota in 1982. Their second son was John Kimball "Kim" Whitney, a Minnesota philanthropist, and a long-time board member of the Boy Scouts of America, who died on November 8, 2010, aged 83.

Grandsons include Wheelock Whitney III, an art historian and philanthropist; Benson Whitney, the former United States Ambassador to Norway; and Connecticut Green Party politician Charles Pillsbury of Doonesbury fame.

=== Ancestry ===
He was the son of Albert Gideon Whitney (1859–1922) and Alice Wheelock (maiden; 1868–1954). By way of his mother, he was the 7th great-grandchild of Ralph Wheelock (1600–1683).
