= Wheelock Whitney (historian) =

American art collector and dealer (born 1949)

Wheelock Whitney III
- Born: October 3, 1949 (age 76); New Haven, Connecticut, United States
- Occupation: Art collector
- Known for: Member of prominent Whitney family
- Board member of: Scenic Hudson: 1994-2003; 2009-present
- Spouse: Sandro Cagnin
- Relatives: Wheelock Whitney, Jr., father Wheelock Whitney, Sr., grandfather Benson Whitney, brother

Wheelock "Lock" Whitney III (born October 3, 1949, in New Haven, Connecticut) is an American art collector and dealer.

== Early life and education ==
Born in Connecticut, Whitney is the son of Wheelock Whitney, Jr. and Irene Hixon. He is the grandson of Wheelock Whitney, Sr. Whitney grew up in the Minnesota branch of the prominent American Whitney family and is of close relation to the Vanderbilt family.

== Career ==
His published books include:

- Gericault in Italy ISBN 0-300-06803-4

He has contributed more than fifty notable 18th- and 19th-century paintings, mainly French, to the Metropolitan Museum of Art in New York.

He is a philanthropist living on the Upper East Side of Manhattan and in the Town of Rhinebeck in Dutchess County, New York.

== Personal life ==
He is the son of Wheelock Whitney, Jr., grandson of Wheelock Whitney, Sr., and the brother of Benson Whitney. His father married Chief Justice Kathleen A. Blatz of the Minnesota Supreme Court in 2005, who was five years his son's junior.
