= Wheelock Whitney Jr. =

American businessman, educator and sports team executive (1926–2016)

- Born: July 30, 1926; St. Cloud, Minnesota, U.S.
- Died: May 20, 2016 (aged 89); Independence, Minnesota, U.S.
- Education: Phillips Academy
- Alma mater: Yale University
- Occupations: Investment banker, educator, sports team owner/executive, politician
- Political party: Republican
- Board member of: Johnson Institute; Minnesota Twins; Minnesota Vikings
- Spouses: Irene Hixon (m. 1948; died 1986) Penny Lewis (m. 1990; div. 1994) Kathleen A. Blatz (m. 2005)
- Children: Wheelock III, Pennell, Joseph, Benson
- Parent(s): Wheelock Whitney & Katharine Kimball
- Honors: Minnesota Business Hall of Fame (2000); Finance magazine's Investment Banker of the Year (1971)

Wheelock "Whee" Whitney Jr. (July 30, 1926 – May 20, 2016) was an American businessman, educator, sports team executive and owner, philanthropist, and politician.

== Early life and education ==
Whitney attended Phillips Andover and Yale University with George H. W. Bush. He and Bush were both members of Delta Kappa Epsilon at Yale. Whitney was a successful investment banker from 1957 until 1972, when he left the industry to teach at the Carlson School of Business at the University of Minnesota.

Whitney was the 1964 Republican nominee for U.S. Senate from Minnesota, losing to Eugene McCarthy, and the Republican nominee for governor of Minnesota in 1982, losing to Rudy Perpich.

== Sports executive ==
Whitney was involved with the Continental League, the third major baseball league, in 1959. He helped obtain the Minnesota Twins Major League Baseball franchise for the state, and served on the team's board of directors from 1961 to 1985. Whitney was also part of the successful effort to obtain a National Hockey League franchise for the city of Bloomington, Minnesota. The team, the Minnesota North Stars, was founded in 1967 and played at the Met Center, which Whitney helped get built. He was also a part-owner and president of the Minnesota Vikings football team for a number of years.

== Personal life ==
Whitney married Irene Hixon on August 21, 1948. They provided aid to Vernon Johnson, who pioneered the method of using an intervention to confront alcoholics and substance abusers so as to get them professional help for their addictions. They created the Johnson Institute after Johnson helped Irene Whitney through an intervention. Irene Whitney died of lung cancer in 1986. In 1990 Whitney married Penny Lewis, a professional horse trainer, from whom he was divorced in 1994. In 2005, he married Chief Justice Kathleen A. Blatz, of the Minnesota Supreme Court. Whitney died on May 20, 2016.

=== Horse racing ===
Whitney was involved with the sport of thoroughbred horse racing for many years. His best-known horse was Quicken Tree, a California runner in the 1960s whose wins included the Santa Anita Handicap, Manhattan Handicap and the Jockey Club Gold Cup.

Party political offices
Preceded by Edward John Thye	Republican nominee for U.S. Senator from Minnesota (Class 1); 1964	Succeeded by Clark MacGregor
Preceded by Al Quie	Republican nominee for Governor of Minnesota; 1982	Succeeded by Cal Ludeman
Preceded by Al Quie	Endorsed Gubernatorial Candidate, Minnesota Republican Party State Convention; 1982	Succeeded by Cal Ludeman
