= Kathleen A. Blatz =

American judge (born 1954)

The Honorable Kathleen Ann Blatz
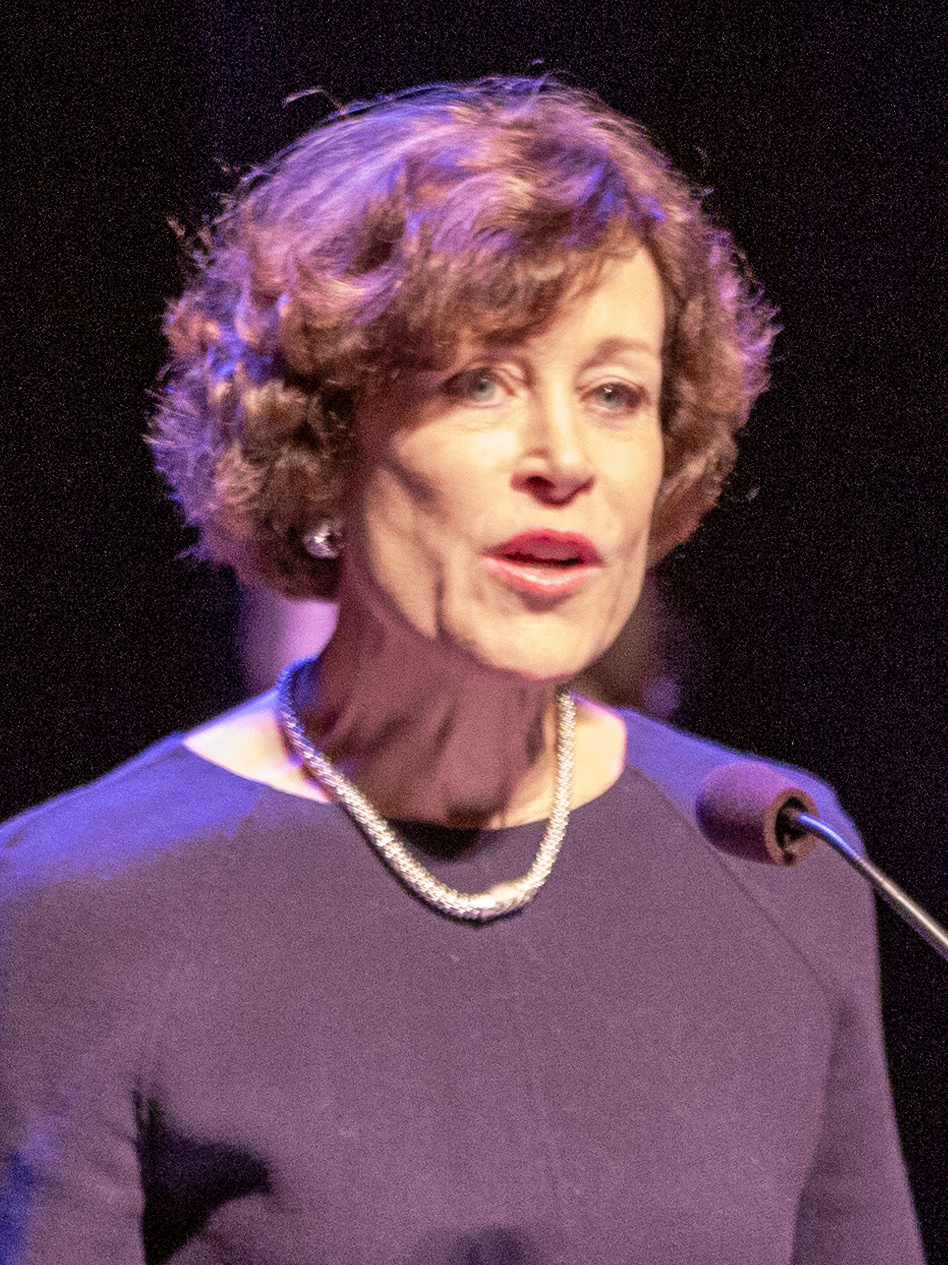
- Blatz in 2019

Chief Justice of the Minnesota Supreme Court
- In office January 29, 1998 – January 10, 2006
- Appointed by: Arne Carlson
- Preceded by: Alexander M. Keith
- Succeeded by: Russell A. Anderson

Member of the Minnesota House of Representatives
- In office January 3, 1979 – January 24, 1994

Personal details
- Born: July 22, 1954 (age 72) Bloomington, Minnesota, U.S.
- Party: Republican
- Spouse(s): Thomas R. Berkelman (m. 1984; div. 2000) Wheelock Whitney Jr. (m. 2005; died 2016)
- Parents: Jerome Blatz (father); Mary Kathleen "Kaye" McMahon (mother)

Kathleen Anne Blatz (born July 22, 1954) is a former Minnesota judge and legislator. She served as the interim chair of the Minnesota Sports Facilities Authority, which governs the U.S. Bank Stadium.

== Early life and education ==
Blatz was born in Minneapolis to Kaye and Jerome Blatz. She attended high school at the Academy of Holy Angels in Richfield, Minnesota, and received her B.A. summa cum laude from the University of Notre Dame. Blatz received degrees from the University of Minnesota Law School and the University of Minnesota School of Social Work.

== Career ==
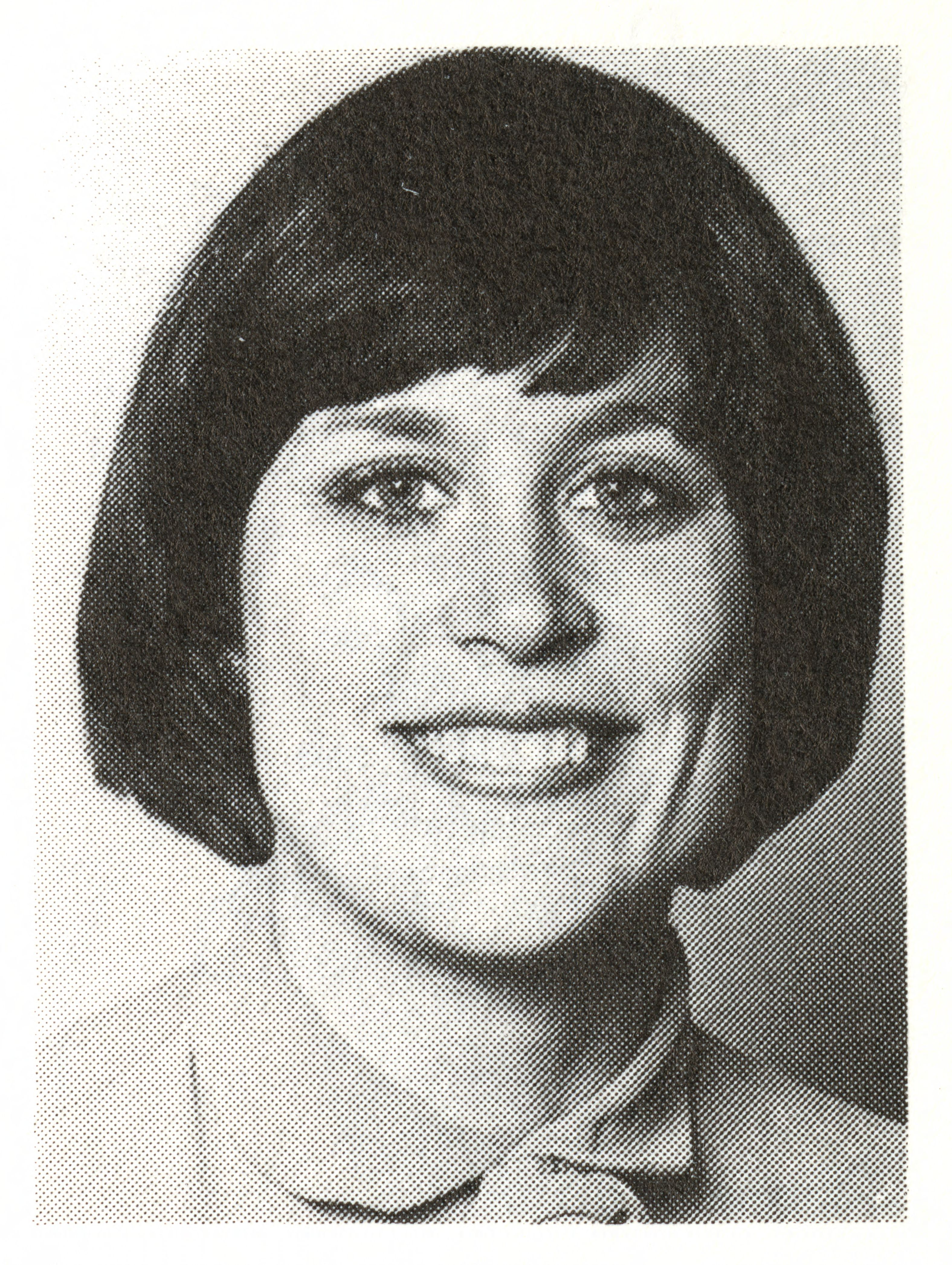
Representative Kathleen Ann Blatz, 1981-1982 Legislative Session, Minnesota Legislature.

Blatz served in the Minnesota House of Representatives from 1979 to 1994. When elected, she was the youngest ever female Minnesota legislator. She was appointed a Hennepin County district court judge in 1994, an associate justice of the Minnesota Supreme Court on November 1, 1996, and Chief Justice on January 29, 1998. She retired from the court on January 10, 2006, and was succeeded as Chief Justice by Russell A. Anderson.

== Personal life ==
Blatz is the daughter of the late Mary Kathleen "Kaye" McMahon Blatz (1926–1996) and Jerome Blatz (1923–2009). She was the second of nine children.

On June 2, 1984, in Hennepin County, she married Thomas R. Berkelman, a Minnesota State Legislator from 1977 to 1983. They had three sons and divorced around 2000.

She married Wheelock Whitney Jr., a businessman and politician, in 2005. He died in 2016.

Blatz is currently married to Gregory R Page, the former CEO of Cargill. They married in 2019.

Legal offices
Preceded by Alexander M. Keith	Chief Justice of the Minnesota Supreme Court; 1998–2006	Succeeded by Russell A. Anderson
