= Prince Umberto, Count of Salemi =

Prince Umberto
- Count of Salemi
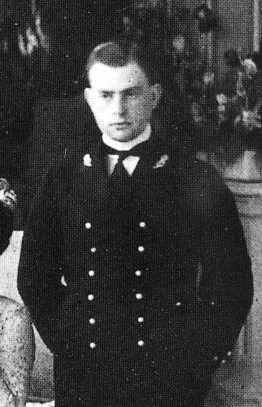
- Born: 22 June 1889; Turin, Kingdom of Italy
- Died: 19 October 1918 (aged 29); Crespano del Grappa, Kingdom of Italy
- Burial: Crespano del Grappa
Names
- Umberto Maria Vittorio Amedeo Giuseppe di Savoia
- House: Savoy
- Father: Prince Amadeo, Duke of Aosta
- Mother: Maria Letizia Bonaparte

Prince Umberto of Savoy (22 June 1889 – 19 October 1918) was a member of the Aosta branch of the House of Savoy and was styled the Count of Salemi.

== Early life ==
Umberto was born in Turin, the fourth son of Prince Amadeo of Savoy, Duke of Aosta, the only one by his second wife and niece Princess Maria Letizia Bonaparte (1866–1926) the daughter of Prince Napoléon and Princess Maria Clotilde of Savoy. His father, a former king of Spain, died when he was just a year old. He had three older half-brothers: the Duke of Aosta, the Count of Turin and the Duke of the Abruzzi.

In 1908 Umberto began studies at the Naval Academy in Livorno. In May 1911, while still at the academy, he was accused of theft. His cousin King Victor Emmanuel III of Italy wanted him arrested, but his mother took him to Turin and challenged the king to carry out the arrest. In July Victor Emmanuel ordered that he be detained at the Castle of Moncalieri and then spend eighteen months aboard a man-of-war, during which time a Carabinieri colonel would act as his tutor and keeper.

== First World War and death ==
During the First World War Umberto volunteered to serve in the Royal Italian Army. He joined the army as a lieutenant and served in a Catania cavalry regiment. During the war he was awarded a silver medal for bravery displayed while acting as a bombing officer.

Umberto died a month before the end of the war. The official court bulletin recorded that he was killed in action, but in fact he was a victim of the 1918 influenza pandemic. He was buried in the cemetery of Crespano del Grappa. In 1926 his remains were moved to the Sacrario Militare del Monte Grappa.

== Ancestry ==
Ancestors of Prince Umberto, Count of Salemi

8. Charles Albert of Sardinia
4. Victor Emmanuel II of Italy
9. Archduchess Maria Theresa of Austria
2. Amadeo I of Spain
10. Archduke Rainer of Austria
5. Archduchess Adelaide of Austria
11. Princess Elisabeth of Savoy
1. Prince Umberto, Count of Salemi
12. Jérôme Bonaparte, King of Westphalia
6. Prince Napoléon-Jérôme Bonaparte
13. Princess Catharina of Württemberg
3. Princess Maria Letizia Bonaparte
14. Victor Emmanuel II of Italy (= 4)
7. Princess Maria Clotilde of Savoy
15. Archduchess Adelaide of Austria (= 5)
