= Louis Bonaparte (1864–1932) =

- Prince Napoléon
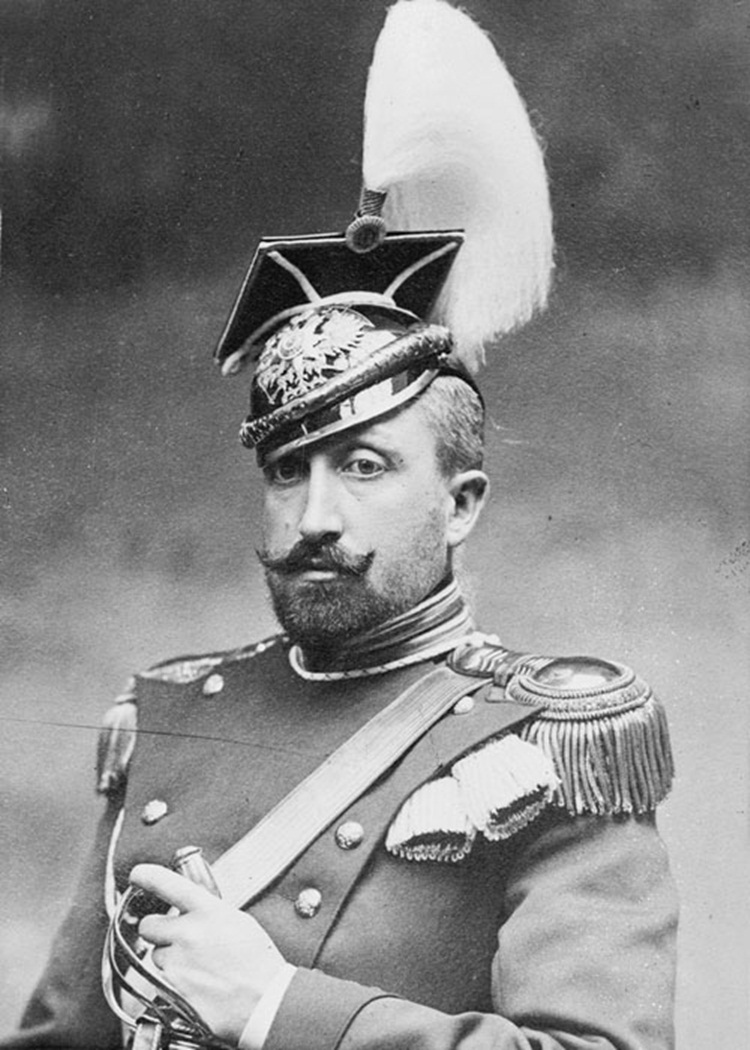
- Born: 16 July 1864; Meudon, France
- Died: 14 October 1932 (aged 68); Prangins, Switzerland
- Burial: Basilica of Superga, Turin
- House: Bonaparte
- Father: Prince Napoléon-Jérôme Bonaparte
- Mother: Princess Maria Clotilde of Savoy

Prince Napoleon Louis Josef Jérôme Bonaparte (16 July 1864 – 14 October 1932) was a member of the House of Bonaparte, as well as a lieutenant-general in the Imperial Russian Army and governor of the province of Yerevan in 1905.

== Early life ==
Louis Bonaparte, as he was known, was born in Meudon, France. He was the second son of Prince Napoléon-Jérôme Bonaparte, who was the son of Napoleon's brother Jérôme Bonaparte and of Princess Maria Clotilde of Savoy, daughter of Victor Emmanuel II of Italy.

== Life ==
He was educated with his older brother Victor, Prince Napoléon, then lived a quiet life in Paris at the home of his aunt Mathilde Bonaparte. His father directed him to a military career. As a relative of Napoleon Bonaparte, he was not allowed to join the French Army, so he became a lieutenant in the Royal Italian Army in Verona, with the approval of his uncle, King Umberto I of Italy. Because of anti-French sentiment in the Italian Army, he left Italy in 1890 and enlisted in the Imperial Russian Army. In 1895 he was promoted to colonel. In 1902 he was stationed in the Caucasus. When riots broke out in 1905 between Armenians and Azeris in Yerevan, he was named governor of the province of Yerevan and ordered to restore order.

In his will, Napoléon-Jérôme designated Louis as his heir, bypassing his first son Victor, who he deemed "a traitor and a rebel". Despite this, Louis publicly recognized his brother as head of the house of Bonaparte following their father's death.

In 1910, he retired from the Russian Army as a lieutenant-general and moved to the family estate in Prangins, Switzerland. After Italy entered the First World War, at the request of Tsar Nicholas II of Russia, he became liaison officer for the Russian Army with the Third Italian Army, led by his cousin Prince Emanuele Filiberto, Duke of Aosta.

In 1917, he returned to Prangins, though his later travels included trips to Japan and the United States.

He died in 1932 from a stroke in Prangins, Switzerland. He never married and had no children.

== Ancestry ==
Ancestors of Louis Bonaparte (1864–1932)

16. Giuseppe Maria Buonaparte
8. Carlo Maria Buonaparte
17. Maria Saveria Paravicini
4. Jérôme Bonaparte, King of Westphalia
18. Giovanni Geronimo Ramolino
9. Maria Letizia Ramolino, Madame Mère de l'Empereur
19. Angela Maria Pietrasanta
2. Prince Napoleon
20. Frederick II Eugene, Duke of Württemberg
10. Frederick I, King of Württemberg
21. Fredericka Dorothea of Brandenburg-Schwedt
5. Catherine of Württemberg
22. Charles II William Ferdinand, Duke of Brunswick-Wolfenbüttel
11. Augusta of Brunswick-Wolfenbüttel
23. Augusta of Great Britain
1. Louis Bonaparte
24. Charles Emmanuel of Savoy (=30)
12. Charles Albert, King of Sardinia
25. Maria Christina of Saxony (=31)
6. Victor Emmanuel II of Italy
26. Ferdinand III, Grand Duke of Tuscany
13. Maria Theresa of Tuscany
27. Luisa of Naples and Sicily
3. Marie Clothilde of Savoy
28. Leopold II, Holy Roman Emperor
14. Rainer Joseph of Austria
29. Maria Luisa of Spain
7. Maria Adelaide of Austria
30. Charles Emmanuel of Savoy (= 24)
15. Elisabeth of Savoy-Carignano
31. Maria Christina of Saxony (= 25)

== Sources ==
- Armenia, the Survival of a Nation by Christopher Walker (ISBN 9780312049447)
- Dictionnaire du Second Empire (1995) by Jean Tulard
- Fire and sword in the Caucasus by Luigi Villari (pages 216–228)
