= Victor, Prince Napoléon =

Pretender to the French throne from 1879 to 1926

Victor
- Prince Napoléon
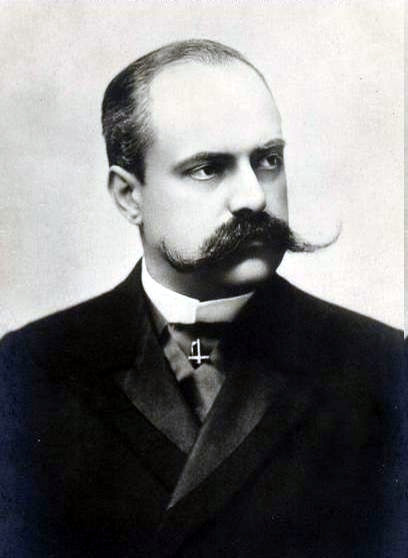

Head of the House of Bonaparte (disputed until 1891)
- Tenure: 1 June 1879 – 3 May 1926
- Predecessor: Napoléon Eugène or Napoléon-Jérôme
- Successor: Louis, Prince Napoléon
- Born: 18 July 1862; Palais Royal, Paris, Second French Empire
- Died: 3 May 1926 (aged 63); Brussels, Belgium
- Spouse: Princess Clémentine of Belgium (m. 1910)
- Issue: Princess Marie-Clotilde; Prince Louis
- House: Bonaparte
- Father: Prince Napoléon-Jérôme
- Mother: Princess Maria Clotilde of Savoy

Victor, Prince Napoléon, titular 3rd Prince of Montfort (Napoléon Victor Jérôme Frédéric Bonaparte; 18 July 1862 – 3 May 1926), was the Bonapartist pretender to the French throne from 1879 until his death in 1926. He was known as Napoléon V by those who supported his claim.

== Biography ==
=== Early life ===
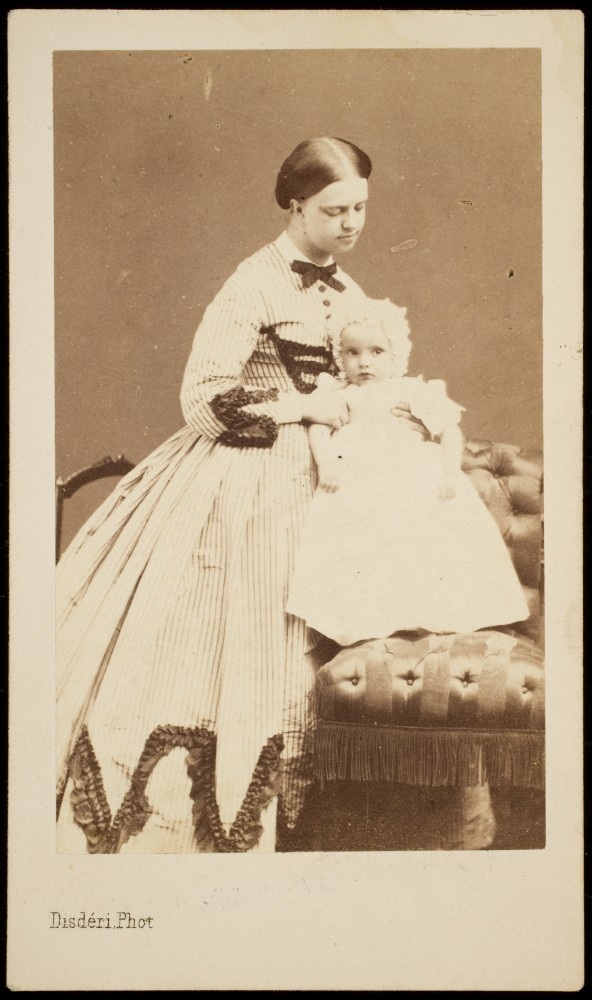
Prince Victor as a baby

He was born in the Palais-Royal of Paris during the Second French Empire, the son of Napoleon's nephew Prince Napoléon-Jérôme Bonaparte and his wife, Princess Marie Clothilde of Savoy, daughter of Victor Emmanuel II of Italy. He had two younger siblings, Prince Louis (1864–1932) and Princess Maria Letizia Bonaparte (1866–1926), later the Duchess of Aosta. At the time of his birth in 1862, he was third in the line of succession to the throne behind Napoléon, Prince Imperial and his father Prince Napoleon. The Empire came to an end in 1870 with the abdication of the Emperor Napoleon III after France's defeat in the Franco-Prussian War.

=== Bonaparte heir ===
He was appointed head of the House of Bonaparte at the age of 18 in the will of Napoléon Eugène, Prince Imperial, who died in 1879, and so became Napoleon V to his supporters, though his younger brother, Prince Louis, a colonel in the Russian Imperial Guard, was preferred to him by many Bonapartists. The decision by the Prince Imperial to bypass Prince Victor's father led to a complete breakdown in relations between father and son. In May 1886, the French Third Republic expelled the princes of the former ruling dynasties and so Prince Victor left France for exile in Belgium.

=== Dreyfus affair ===
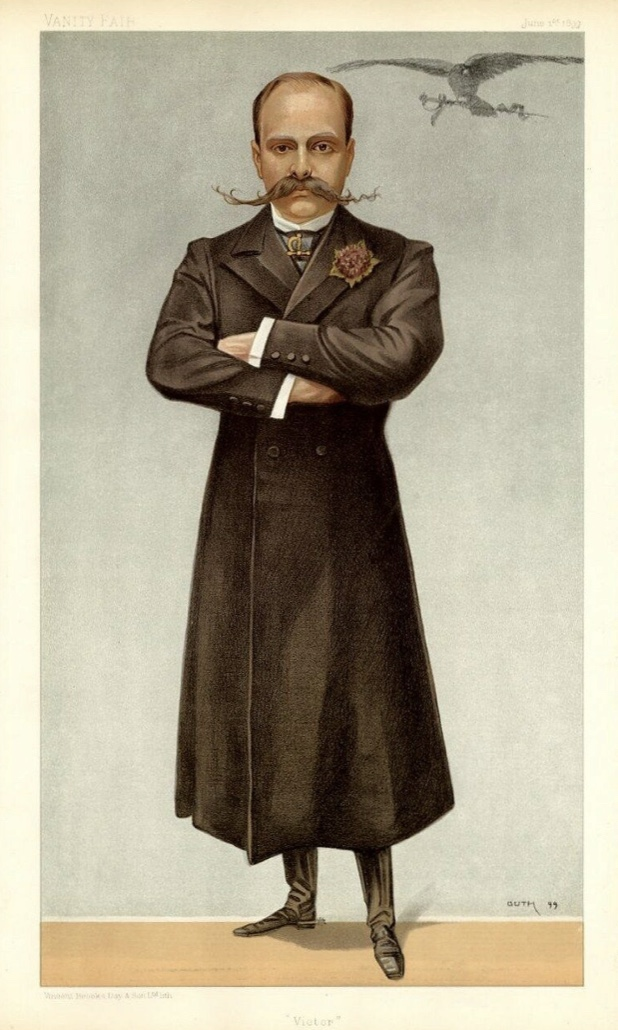
Victor in 1899, by Guth

At the time of the death of President Félix Faure in 1899, during the Dreyfus affair, a number of political factions attempted to take advantage of the disorder and Prince Victor announced to a delegation from the Imperialist committee that he would take action to restore the French Empire when he felt that the time was favourable. In order to achieve this, he announced he would place himself at the head of the movement with his brother, Prince Louis, fighting beside him who he said would be "bringing to the Bonapartist forces his prestige and his military talents as well as his rank in the Russian army". The Duke of Orléans, rival claimant to the throne, also had forces available and they were ready to cross the French frontier at the same time as the Bonapartist forces. In the end the anticipated outbreak in France did not materialise and the French Third Republic survived one of its gravest crises.

=== Death ===
Prince Victor died on 3 May 1926 in Brussels with the French author Charles Maurras commenting on Prince Victor's time as pretender saying that he had not offered any new ideas since 1884 and no radical alternatives to republican governments. He was succeeded as the Bonaparte heir by his only son, Prince Louis.

== Family ==
On 10 November/14 November 1910, at Moncalieri, Prince Victor was married to Princess Clémentine of Belgium (1872–1955), daughter of Leopold II of Belgium and Marie Henriette of Austria. They had two children:

- Princess Marie Clotilde Eugénie Alberte Laëtitia Généviève Bonaparte (1912–1996); married Comte Serge de Witt and had issue.
- Prince Louis Napoléon (1914–1997)

== Ancestry ==
Ancestors of Victor, Prince Napoléon

8. Carlo Buonaparte
4. Jérôme Bonaparte, King of Westphalia
9. Letizia Ramolino
2. Prince Napoléon-Jérôme Bonaparte
10. Frederick I of Württemberg
5. Catharina of Württemberg
11. Augusta of Brunswick-Wolfenbüttel
1. Victor, Prince Napoléon
12. Charles Albert of Sardinia
6. Victor Emmanuel II of Italy
13. Maria Theresa of Austria
3. Princess Maria Clotilde of Savoy
14. Archduke Rainer of Austria
7. Archduchess Adelaide of Austria
15. Princess Elisabeth of Savoy

Victor, Prince Napoléon House of Bonaparte Born: 18 July 1862 Died: 3 May 1926
Titles in pretence
Preceded by Napoléon IV Eugène	— TITULAR — Emperor of the French; 1 June 1879 – 3 May 1926; Reason for succession failure: Empire abolished in 1870	Succeeded by Napoléon VI Louis
