= Prince Umberto =

Prince Umberto may refer to:

- Umberto I of Italy (1844-1900), formerly Prince of Piedmont
- Prince Umberto, Count of Salemi (1889-1918)
- Umberto II of Italy (1904-1983), formerly Prince of Piedmont
