= Maria Letizia Bonaparte, Duchess of Aosta =

Duchess of Aosta (1866–1926)

Maria Letizia Bonaparte
- Duchess of Aosta
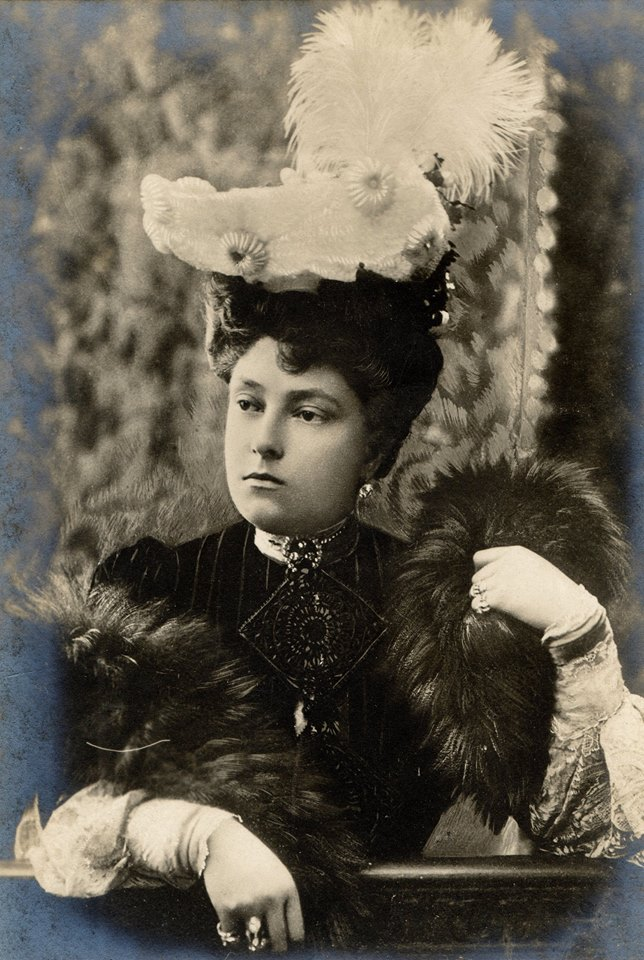
- Princess Maria Letizia in the 1890s
- Born: 20 November 1866; Palais Royal, Paris, Second French Empire
- Died: 25 October 1926 (aged 59); Moncalieri, Kingdom of Italy
- Spouse: Amadeo I of Spain (m. 1888; died 1890)
- Issue: Prince Umberto, Count of Salemi
Names
- Marie Laetitia Eugénie Catherine Adélaïde Bonaparte
- House: Bonaparte
- Father: Prince Napoléon-Jérôme Bonaparte
- Mother: Princess Maria Clotilde of Savoy

Maria Letizia Bonaparte (French: Marie Laetitia Eugénie Catherine Adélaïde; 20 November 1866 – 25 October 1926) was one of three children born to Prince Napoléon-Jérôme and his wife Princess Maria Clotilde of Savoy. In 1888, she married Prince Amadeo, Duke of Aosta, the former king of Spain and her uncle. Following her marriage, Maria Letizia became Duchess of Aosta. Their marriage was instrumental in almost reviving French hopes of reinstating the Bonaparte dynasty into a position of power, as seen in the days of Napoleon III.

== Family and early life ==
Maria Letizia's father Napoléon-Jérôme was a nephew of Emperor Napoleon Bonaparte through his brother Jérôme Bonaparte, King of Westphalia. This then made Maria Letizia a great-niece of Emperor Napoleon. Her mother Maria Clotilde was a daughter of Victor Emmanuel II of Italy. Through this connection, Maria Letizia was a niece of King Umberto I of Italy and Queen Maria Pia of Portugal.

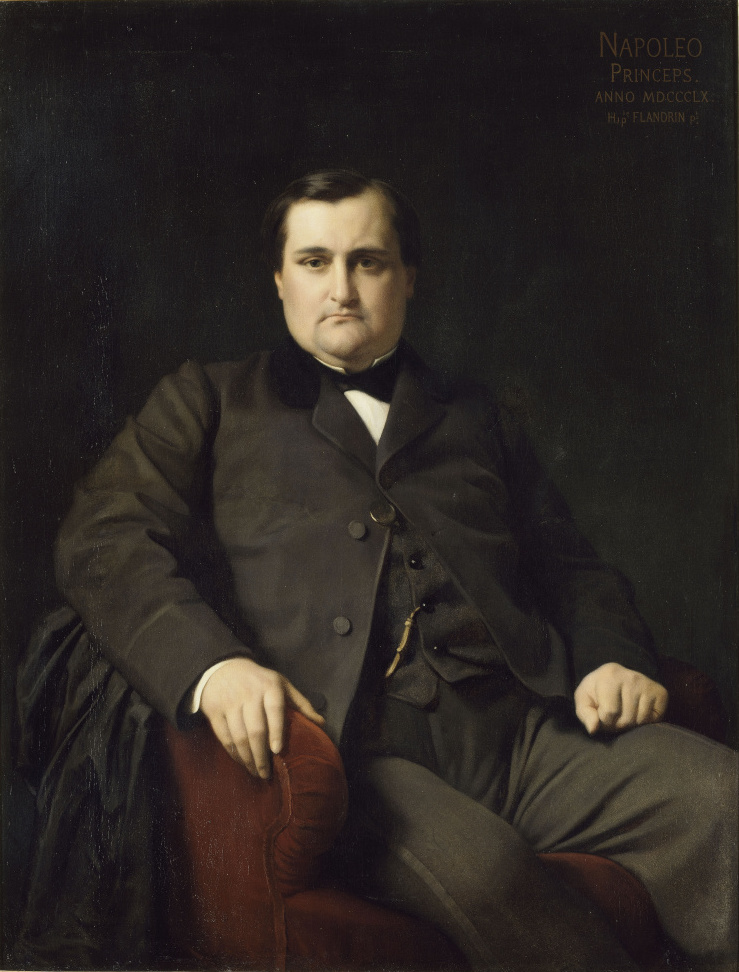
Maria Letizia's father Napoléon-Jérôme Bonaparte

Maria Letizia was born in the Palais Royal in Paris on 20 November 1866, during the last few years of the Second French Empire. She grew up living between Paris, Rome and elsewhere in Italy with her two brothers Napoléon Victor and Louis. After the fall of the French Empire in 1870, their family resided in a beautiful estate near Lake Geneva.

=== State of parents' marriage ===
The marriage of Maria Letizia's parents was unhappy, however. Maria Clotilde preferred the quieter, more duty-filled life that she felt they should maintain, while Napoléon-Jérôme preferred the faster, more entertainment-filled lifestyle of the French court. Another factor in their unhappy marriage was the circumstances leading up to their espousal. Maria Clotilde had been only 15 when they were married, while her husband had been over 37 years old. The marriage had also been negotiated out of political reasons during the conference of Plombières (July 1858). As Maria Clotilde was too young at the time for marriage, Napoléon-Jérôme had had to wait until the following year; many had disapproved of the speed he undertook collecting his young bride in Turin. Their marriage was often compared to that of an elephant and a gazelle; the bridegroom had strong Napoleonic features (broad, bulky, and ponderous) while the bride appeared frail, short, fair-haired, and with the characteristic nose of the House of Savoy.

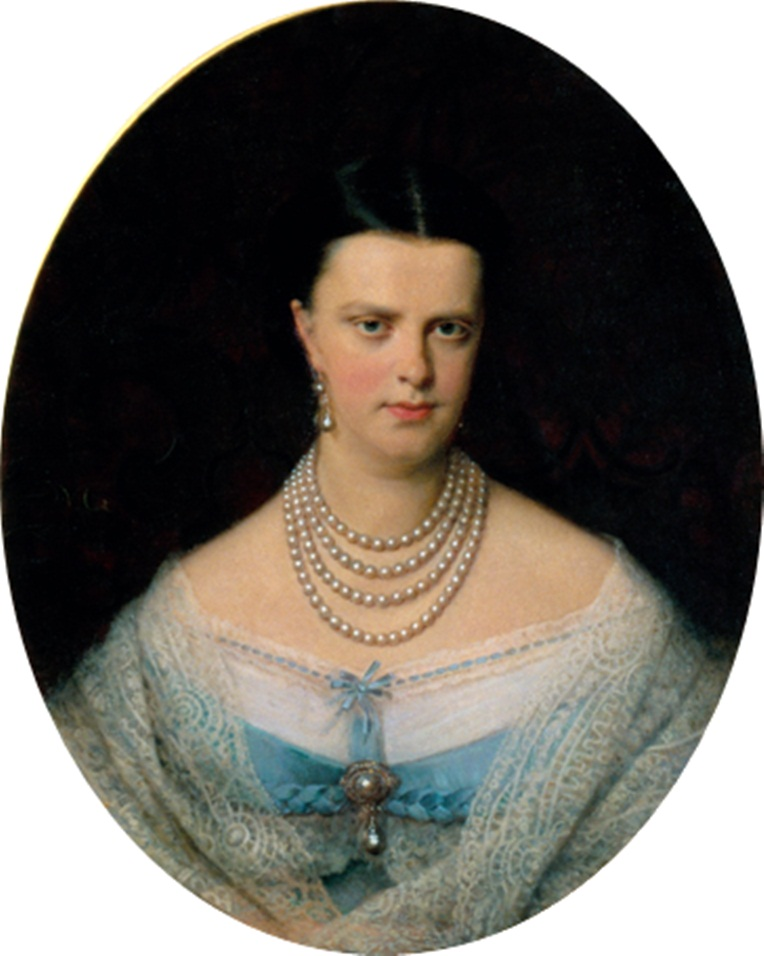
Maria Letizia's mother Maria Clotilde of Savoy

The marriage was also unpopular with both the French and the Italians; the latter in particular felt that the daughter of their king had been sacrificed to an unpopular member of the House of Bonaparte and consequently regarded it as a mésalliance. For France's part, Napoléon-Jérôme was ill-regarded and had been known to carry on a number of affairs both before and during his marriage. Their official reception into Paris on 4 February was greeted very coldly by Parisians, not out of disrespect for a daughter of the king of Sardinia, but instead out of dislike for her new husband. Indeed, all her life public sympathy tended to lean in her favour; she was fondly regarded as retiring, charitable, pious, and trapped in an unhappy marriage.

After Maria Clotilde's father Victor Emmanuel died in 1878, she returned to Turin, Italy, without her husband. During this period, Maria Letizia mostly resided with her mother in the Castle of Moncalieri, but her two brothers stayed mainly with their father. It was in Italy that their mother withdrew herself from society to dedicate herself to religion and various charities. As a result of her mother's religious devotion, Maria Letizia was raised in a convent-like atmosphere.

=== Suitors ===
By her late teens, Maria Letizia was considered by some contemporaries to be beautiful and to be in appearance a "real Bonaparte". She was said to have resembled some of the sisters of Napoleon Bonaparte, who were considered quite beautiful in their day.

In Florence, Maria Letizia met and almost married her cousin Prince Emanuele Filiberto of Savoy. A change of plans occurred however, and the marriage never took place. Emanuele later married Princess Hélène of Orléans instead. In 1886, a rumour circulated that Maria Letizia was going to marry her cousin Prince Roland Bonaparte. He was thirty years old and recently widowed. Nothing ever came of these rumors however.

== Marriage ==
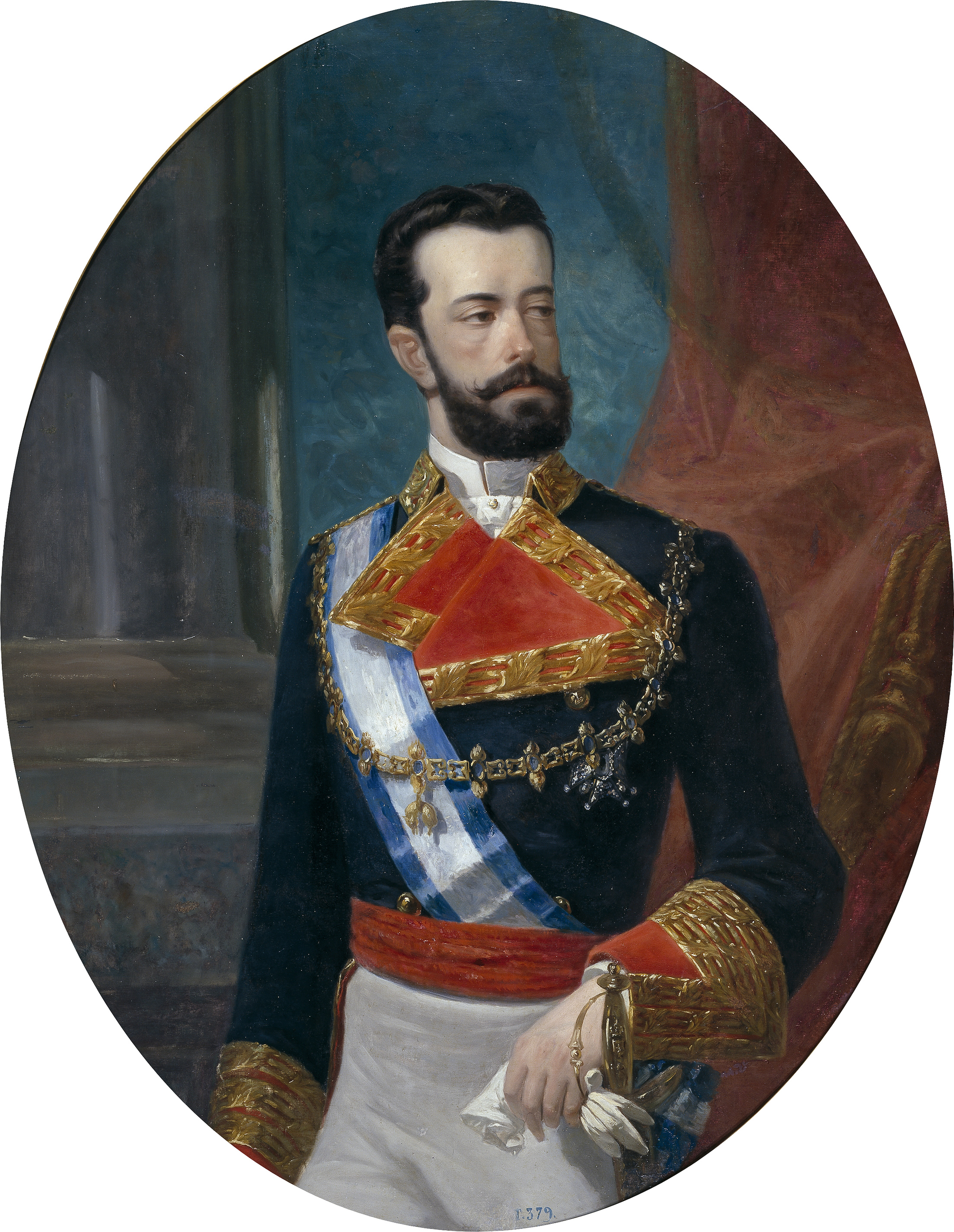
An older portrait of Maria Letizia's husband, Prince Amadeus of Savoy, Duke of Aosta, during his time as King of Spain.

=== Engagement ===
It was in Moncalieri that she met Emanuele's father, Amadeus, Duke of Aosta (sometimes referred to as Amadeo). He was her maternal uncle and was formerly the elected king of Spain for the brief period of three years (1870–1873).

Maria Letizia was considered very charming, and Amadeus was very dependent on her society when he visited Italy. In 1888, she agreed to marry him. One source attributes the marriage to the fact that Amadeus felt great love for his niece, but it states that Maria Letizia's decision was simply a "strong desire for independence on the part of the Princess because of the heaviness of the maternal yoke". In preparation for the marriage, she received a great number of notable gifts from personages such as Empress Eugenie, the widowed wife of Napoleon III, and Amadeus's three sons.

Eugenie sent her some "great and illustrious" family jewels, and the boys gave her a necklace with seven rows of pearls that was valued at $60,000. The couple planned to marry in Turin in the hopes of turning the city into a "brilliant centre of attraction in Italy".

=== Cause for scandal ===
The announcement of their marriage caused a great scandal in the Italian court, as he was not only 23 years older but also her mother's brother. Nevertheless, later that year, the necessary papal dispensation was obtained, which gave them permission to marry. Despite the Pope's permission, the consanguinity of their marriage, along with those of other royal houses, led Pope Leo XIII to declare in 1902 that no more dispensations would be granted for such marriages.

=== Wedding ===
They wed on 11 September 1888 at the Royal Palace of Turin in Turin, Italy. The ceremony was performed by the Archbishop of Turin, Cardinal Gaetano Alimonda, who had gone to Rome to obtain their dispensation. Their wedding was attended by many members of the Houses of Bonaparte and Savoy, including Queen Maria Pia of Portugal, who was Amadeus's sister and Maria Letizia's maternal aunt. Maria Letizia was Amadeus' second wife, as his first wife, Maria Vittoria del Pozzo della Cisterna, had died in 1876. The large age difference made Maria Letizia only three years older than Amadeus's eldest child.

It was the first marriage of a Bonaparte to a member of a reigning house of Europe since 1859. As the first major event since the fall of the Second French Republic, the marriage attracted considerable press attention to the Bonapartes' marriage prospects and to the potential impact on their establishment of another government.

One article stated that at the time of their marriage, a Bonaparte would have had an easy chance of obtaining at least two million votes if a plebiscite were to occur. That likelihood of a Bonaparte resurgence was most likely because there was a certain nostalgia among the French for the days of Maria Letizia's great-uncle Napoleon I and even for the more recent rule of her uncle Napoleon III.

The couple lived in Turin and had one son, Prince Umberto, Count of Salemi (1889–1918), who died of the Spanish flu during World War I. Maria Letizia was widowed after less than two years of marriage when Amadeus died on 18 January 1890.

== Later life ==
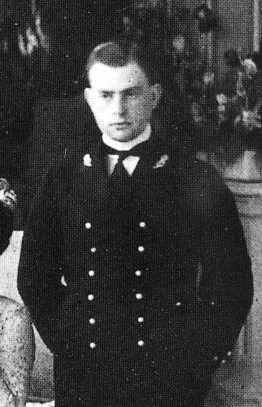
Maria Letizia's only child Prince Umberto, Count of Salemi in an undated photograph.

=== Relationship with Italian court ===
Until 1902, Umberto and his mother were rarely seen at the Italian court. No images of Umberto were ever distributed, unlike other members of the Italian royal family. His absence sparked many rumors, some implying that he was "mentally afflicted" or "misshapen". In later years, he would appear more in the press and disprove all of those theories.

Amadeus's first wife had been a wealthy woman. Upon her death, she left her vast fortune to him and their three sons. That meant that any wealth that Amadeus had accumulated went to his first three children, which left little to nothing upon his death for Maria Letizia and their son Umberto. They thus remained dependent upon the allowance they received from the Italian crown. That dependency would cause problems later, as Umberto often angered his cousin Victor Emmanuel III of Italy, the head of the House of Savoy. After Umberto committed various misdemeanors and pranks in 1911, he was imprisoned in Moncalieri Castle.

He had recently been dismissed from the naval academy in Livorno for what was apparently incorrigible behavior and for amorous attentions to some young women in the town. Maria Letizia, worried over what she considered her son's harsh sentence, wrote to Queen Elena and asked her to intercede for her son. The King remained adamant, however, and reduced the sentence only slightly because of the recent death of his aunt Princess Maria Clotilde, Maria Letizia's mother.

=== Death and inheritance ===
During her widowhood, Maria Letizia maintained an open and scandalous relationship with Norberto Fischer, a military man twenty years her junior, who later wed the opera singer Vina Bovy. Upon Maria Letizia's death, on 25 October 1926, he was named in her will as her sole heir.

== Ancestry ==
Ancestors of Maria Letizia Bonaparte, Duchess of Aosta

8. Carlo Maria Buonaparte
4. Jérôme Bonaparte, King of Westphalia
9. Maria Letizia Ramolino
2. Prince Napoléon-Jérôme Bonaparte
10. Frederick I of Württemberg
5. Princess Catharina of Württemberg
11. Duchess Auguste Karoline of Brunswick-Wolfenbüttel
1. Princess Maria Letizia Bonaparte
12. Charles Albert of Sardinia
6. Victor Emmanuel II of Italy
13. Archduchess Maria Theresa of Austria
3. Princess Maria Clotilde of Savoy
14. Archduke Rainer of Austria
7. Archduchess Adelaide of Austria
15. Princess Elisabeth of Savoy
