= Prince Napoléon-Jérôme Bonaparte =

French politician and member of the House of Bonaparte (1822–1891)

- Prince of Montfort
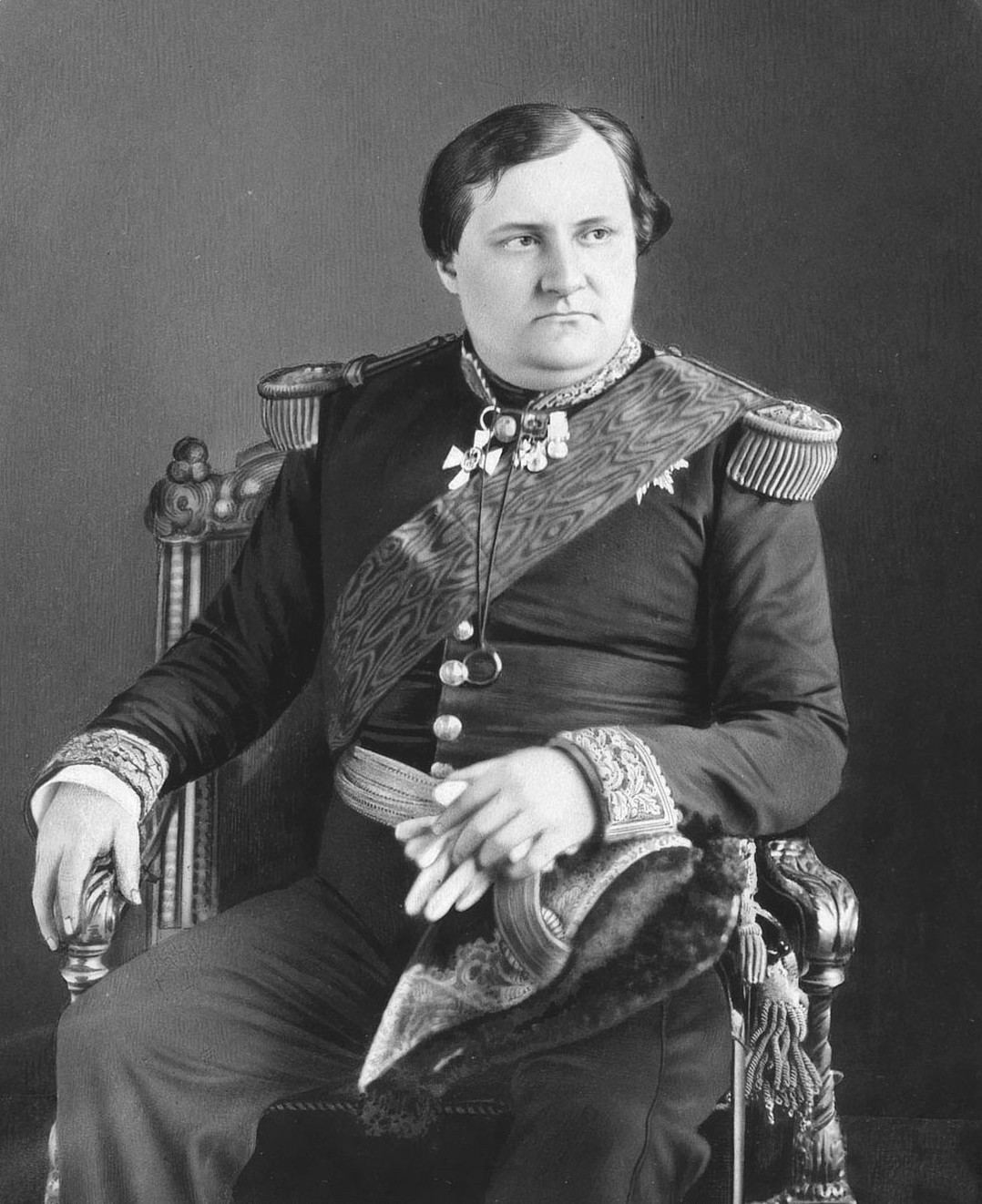
- Photograph, c. 1875

Head of the House of Bonaparte (disputed)
- Tenure: 1 June 1879 – 17 March 1891
- Predecessor: Napoléon Eugène, Prince Imperial
- Successor: Victor, Prince Napoléon
- Born: 9 September 1822; Trieste, Austria
- Died: 17 March 1891 (aged 68); Rome, Italy
- Burial: Basilica of Superga, Turin
- Spouse: Maria Clotilde of Savoy (m. 1859)
- Issue: Victor, Prince Napoléon; Prince Louis; Maria Letizia, Duchess of Aosta
- House: Bonaparte
- Father: Jérôme Bonaparte
- Mother: Catharina of Württemberg

Prince Napoléon Joseph Charles Paul Bonaparte (9 September 1822 – 17 March 1891), usually called Napoléon-Jérôme Bonaparte or Jérôme Bonaparte, was the second son of Jérôme, King of Westphalia, youngest brother of Napoleon I, and his second wife Catharina of Württemberg. Following the death of his cousin Louis-Napoléon, Prince Imperial in 1879, he claimed headship of the House of Bonaparte until his death in 1891. An outspoken liberal however, he was passed over as heir in his cousin's final will, which instead chose his elder son Victor, who was favored by most Bonapartists. From the 1880s onwards, he was one of the stronger supporters of General Georges Boulanger, together with other monarchist forces.

As well as bearing the title of Prince Napoléon, given to him by his cousin Emperor Napoleon III in 1852, he was also 2nd Prince of Montfort, 1st Count of Meudon and Count of Moncalieri, following his marriage with Maria Clotilde of Savoy in 1859. His popular nickname, Plon-Plon, stemmed from his difficulty in pronouncing his own name while still a child, although other notable historians and contemporary letters by his nephew Colonel Jérôme Bonaparte claim it was because he ran in cowardice during battle when the bombs fell. Another nickname, "Craint-Plomb" ("Afraid-of-Lead",) was given to him by the army due to his absence from the Battle of Solferino.

== Biography ==
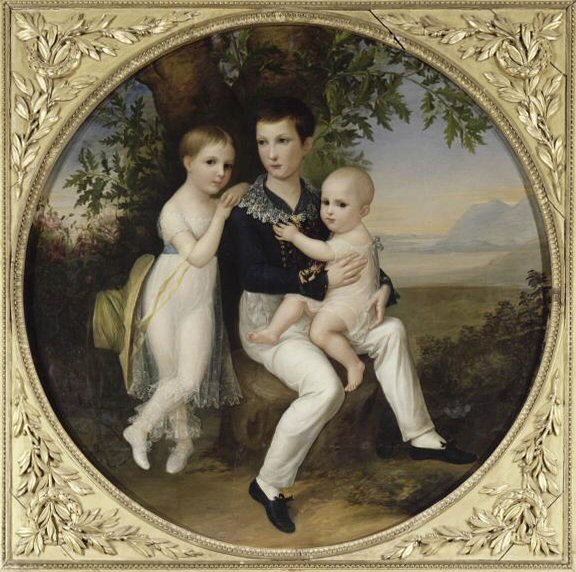
Portrait of the children of Jérôme Bonaparte, c. 1825

Born at Trieste in the Austrian Empire (today Italy), and known as "Prince Napoléon", "Prince Napoléon-Jérôme," (Note: Throughout his life, he was consistently known as “Prince Napoléon.” As an adult, he would often be referred to as “Napoléon-Jérôme,” or “Napoléon(Jérôme)” to differentiate him as Napoléon, son of Jérôme. However, this led him to commonly be referred to as such, or even as “Jérôme-Napoléon,” despite it not being his legal name, although the name and its variations were sometimes used in legal documents.) or by the sobriquet of "Plon-Plon", he was a close advisor to his first cousin, Napoleon III of France, and in particular was seen as a leading advocate of French intervention in Italy on behalf of Camillo Benso, Count of Cavour and the Italian nationalists. Until Napoleon III produced an heir apparent, the Bonaparte family were at odds for who should be the heir presumptive, a matter complicated by Jérôme Bonaparte's first marriage to American Elizabeth Patterson Bonaparte, with whom he had a son, Jérôme Napoléon Bonaparte. A meeting of the Bonaparte family, presided over by Napoleon III, determined that Jérôme Napoléon Bonaparte and his descendants would be excluded from the line of succession, making Prince Napoléon the heir presumptive.

An anti-clerical liberal, he led that faction at court and tried to influence the Emperor to anti-clerical policies, against the contrary influence of the Emperor's wife, the Empress Eugénie, a devout Catholic and a conservative, and the patroness of those who wanted French troops to protect the Pope's sovereignty in Rome. The Emperor was to navigate between the two influences throughout his reign.

When his cousin Louis-Napoléon became president in 1848, Napoléon-Jérôme was appointed Minister Plenipotentiary to Spain. He later served as general of a division in the Crimean War, as Governor of Algeria, and as a corps commander in the French Army of Italy in 1859. His residency in Paris, the Maison pompéienne, was renowned for its neo-Pompeian architecture.

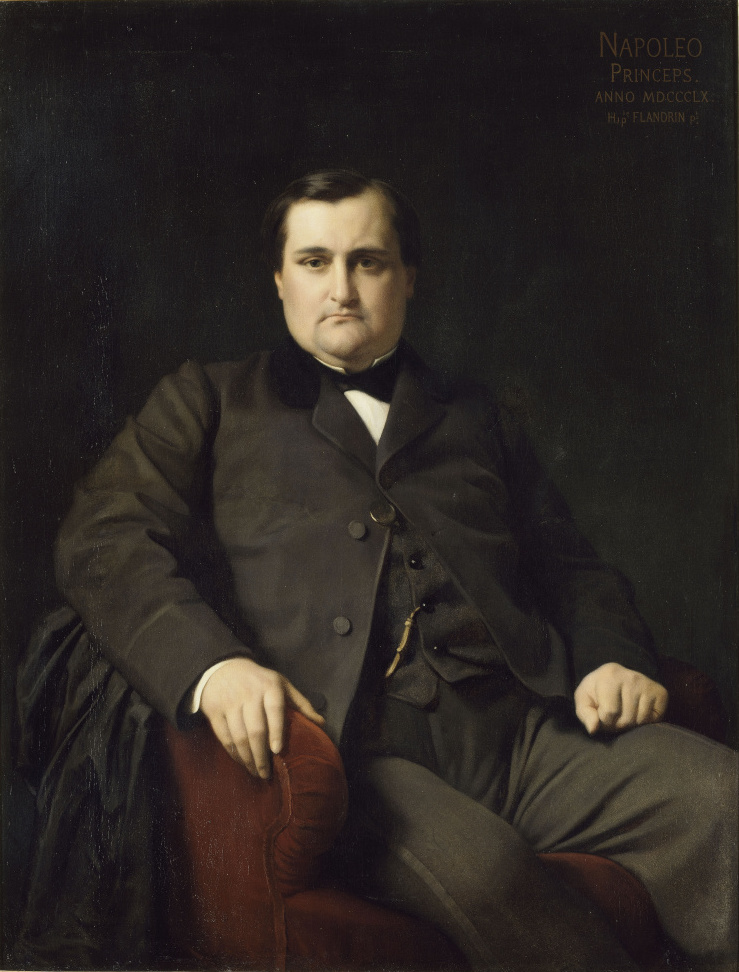
Portrait by Flandrin, 1860 (Musée d'Orsay)

His cousin Louis-Napoloon became Emperor Napoléon III in 1852. As part of Napoléon III's policy of alliance with Piedmont-Sardinia, in 1859 Napoléon-Jérôme married Princess Maria Clotilde of Savoy, daughter of Victor Emmanuel II. This did not prevent a nine-year relationship with the courtesan Cora Pearl. In 1865, after a public political dispute with Napoléon III, he resigned from his government posts, including the presidency of the 1867 Paris Exposition, and left for his Villa Prangins in Switzerland. In 1866, he sold the Maison pompéienne.

When Louis-Napoléon, Prince Imperial died in 1879, Prince Napoléon-Jérôme became, genealogically, the most senior member of the Bonaparte family, but the Prince Imperial's will excluded him from the succession, nominating Prince Napoléon-Jérôme's son Victor as his successor. As a result, Prince Napoléon-Jérôme and his son quarreled for the remainder of Prince Napoléon-Jérôme's life. In his final will, Napoléon-Jérôme excluded Victor as his heir, declaring him "a traitor and a rebel", instead nominating his younger son Louis as his successor.

Prince Napoléon-Jérôme, upon being banished from France by the 1886 law exiling heads of the nation's former ruling dynasties, settled at Prangins on the shores of Lake Geneva, in Vaud, Switzerland where, during the Second Empire, he had acquired a piece of property. The assets he left his heir were extremely modest: Besides the Villa Prangins and the adjoining estate of 75 hectares, estimated at 800,000 francs of the time, approximately 130 million of France's old francs, they were limited to a portfolio valued at 1,000,000 (1891) francs, about 160 million old francs.

Prince Napoléon-Jérôme died in Rome in 1891, aged 68.

=== Issue ===
He and Princess Maria Clotilde had three children:

Name	Birth	Death	Notes
Victor, Prince Napoléon	1862	1926	married Princess Clémentine of Belgium, a daughter of Leopold II of Belgium.
Louis Bonaparte	1864	1932	Russian Lieutenant General and Governor of Erivan
Maria Letizia Bonaparte	1866	1926	who in 1888 became the second wife of her maternal uncle Prince Amedeo, Duke of Aosta (1845–1890), who had, from 1870 until 1873, reigned as King of Spain.

== Honours ==
- French Empire: Grand Cross of the Legion of Honour, 3 January 1853
- Belgium: Grand Cordon of the Order of Leopold, 1 January 1854
- United Kingdom: Honorary Grand Cross of the Bath (military), 5 September 1855
- Sweden-Norway:
  - Grand Cross of St. Olav, 3 September 1856
  - Knight of the Seraphim, 12 September 1856
- Denmark: Knight of the Elephant, 24 September 1856

== Ancestry ==
Ancestors of Prince Napoléon-Jérôme Bonaparte

8. Nobile Giuseppe Maria Buonaparte
4. Nobile Carlo Maria Buonaparte
9. Maria Saveria Paravicini
2. Jérôme Bonaparte, King of Westphalia, 1st Prince von Montfort
10. Giovanni Geronimo Ramolino
5. Maria Letizia Ramolino
11. Angela Maria Pietrasanta
1. Napoléon-Jérôme Bonaparte, Prince Français
12. Frederick II Eugene, Duke of Württemberg
6. Frederick I of Württemberg
13. Princess Friederike of Brandenburg-Schwedt
3. Princess Catharina of Württemberg
14. Charles William Ferdinand, Duke of Brunswick
7. Duchess Augusta of Brunswick-Wolfenbüttel
15. Princess Augusta of Great Britain

== Gallery ==
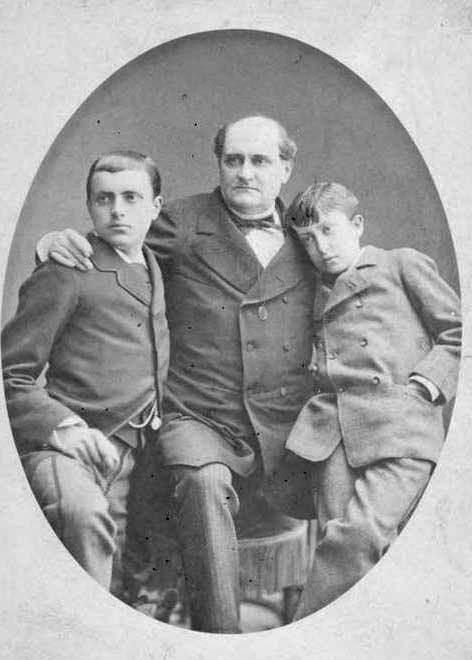
Prince Napoléon-Jérôme with his two sons

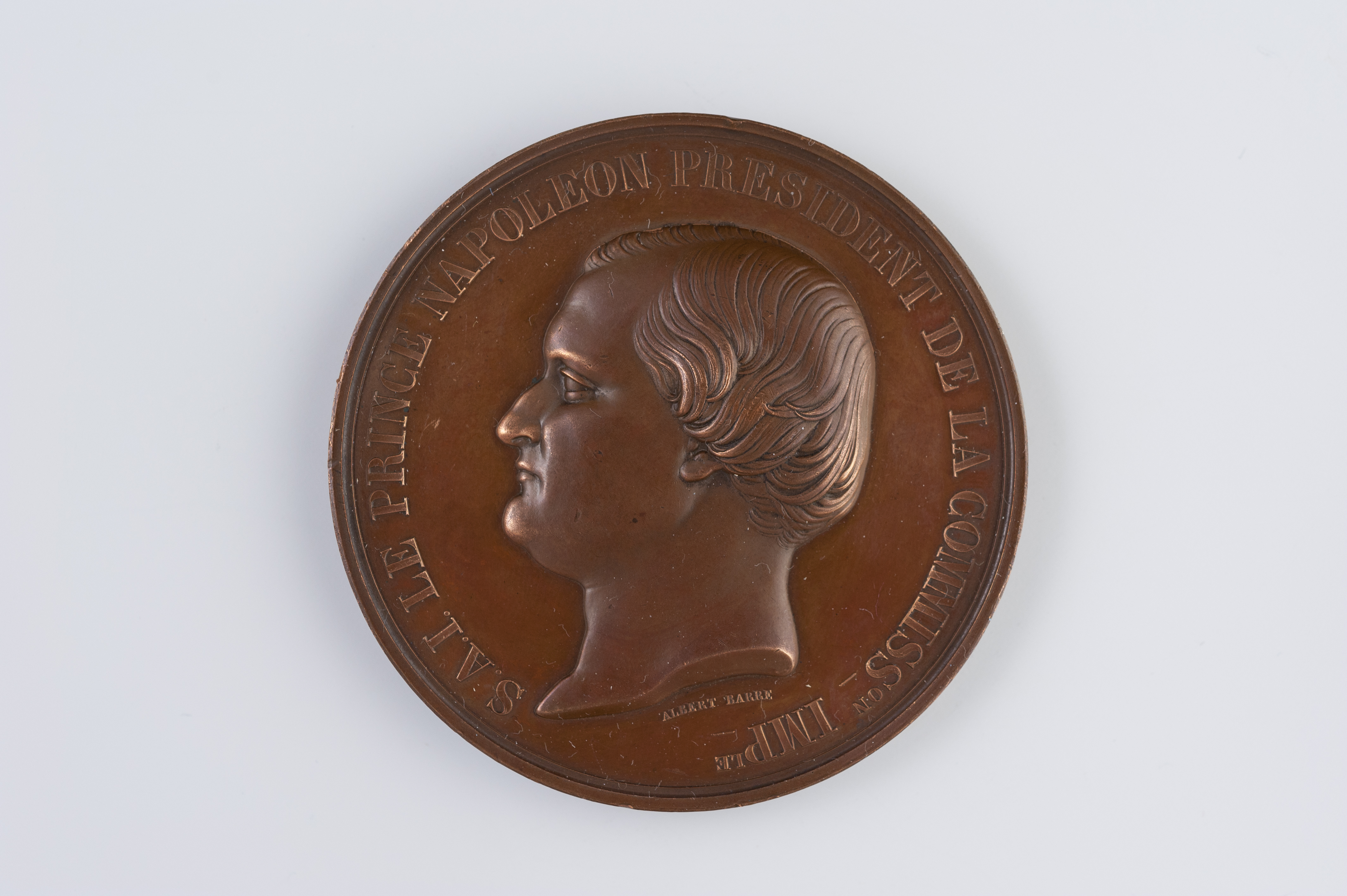
Medal from the 1855 Paris Exposition

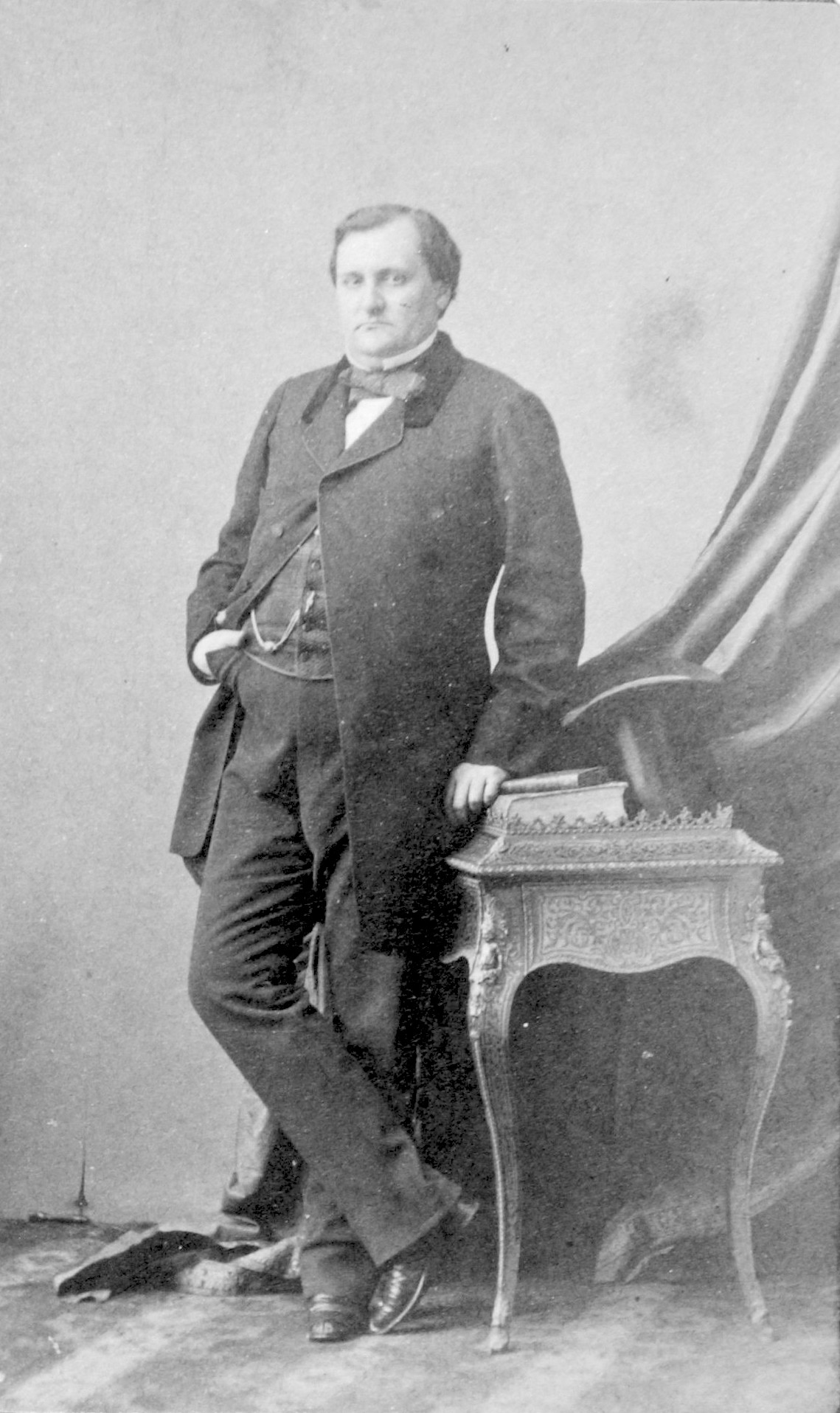
Photograph, 1859

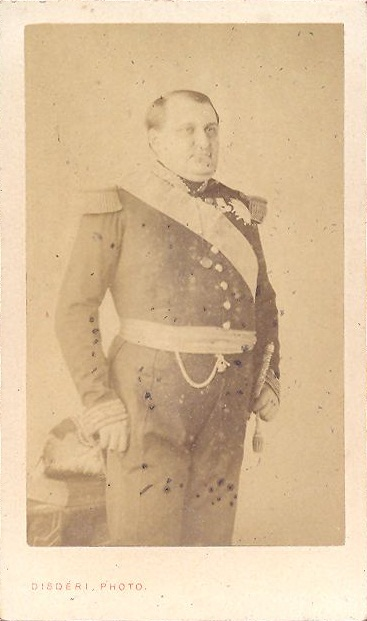
Photograph by André-Adolphe-Eugène Disdéri, 1865

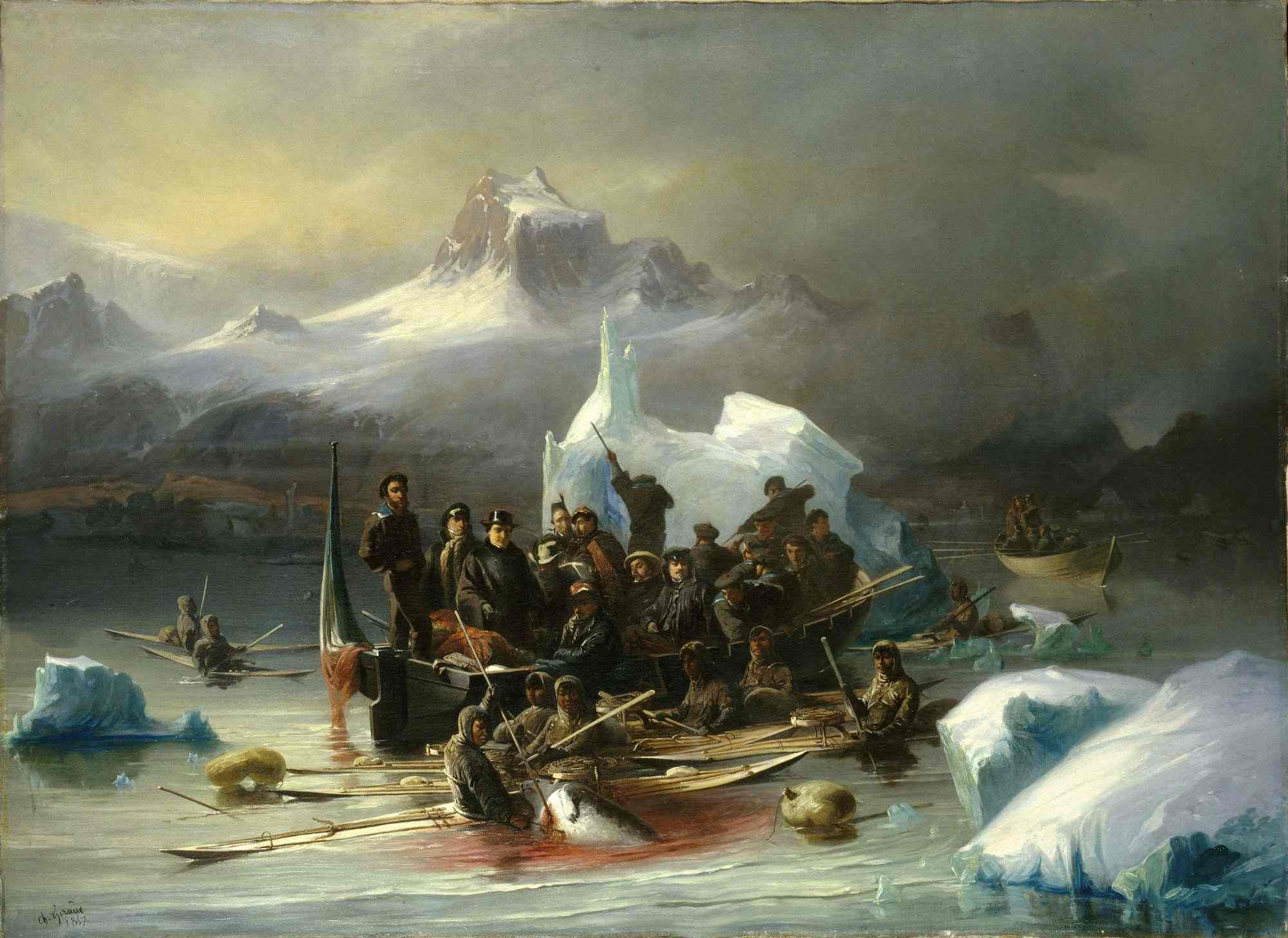
Le prince Napoléon assiste à la chasse au phoque au large de Godthaab en 1856, by Sébastien Charles Giraud

Oriental Army of the Crimean campaign by Gustav Bartsch. From left to right: Admiral Ferdinand-Alphonse Hamelin, Lord Lucan, Lord Raglan, Admiral Dundas, Sir John Campbell, Duke of Cambridge, Lord Cardigan, Ismail Pasha, Omer Pasha, Muhlis Pasha (Grigore Sturdza), Sultan Abdülmecid I, Said-Bey (Vasile Obedeanu), Ahmed Pasha, col. Desmaret, Marshal Baraguey d'Hilliers, Prince Napoleon, col. Trochu, Marshal de Saint-Arnaud, general Bosquet, general de Canrobert

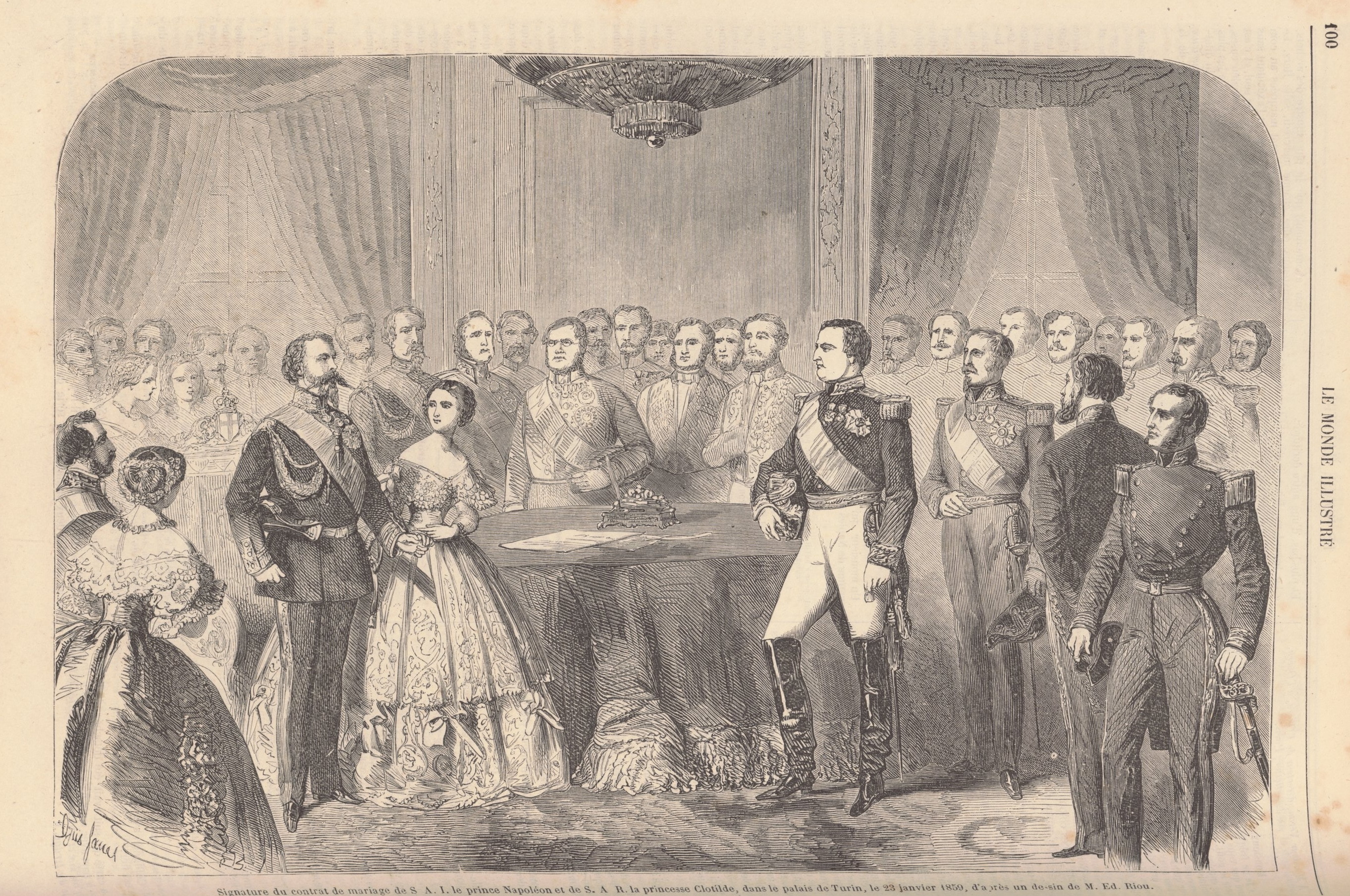
Drawing of the marriage of Prince Napoleon and Maria Clotilde of Savoy, 1859

Prince Napoléon-Jérôme Bonaparte House of Bonaparte Born: 9 September 1822 Died: 17 March 1891
Titles in pretence
Preceded by Napoléon IV Eugène	— TITULAR — Emperor of the French; 1 June 1879 - 17 March 1891; Reason for succession failure: Empire abolished in 1870	Succeeded by Napoléon V Victor
