= Princess Maria Clotilde of Savoy =

Daughter of Vittorio Emanuele II (1843–1911)

Maria Clotilde of Savoy
- Princess Napoléon
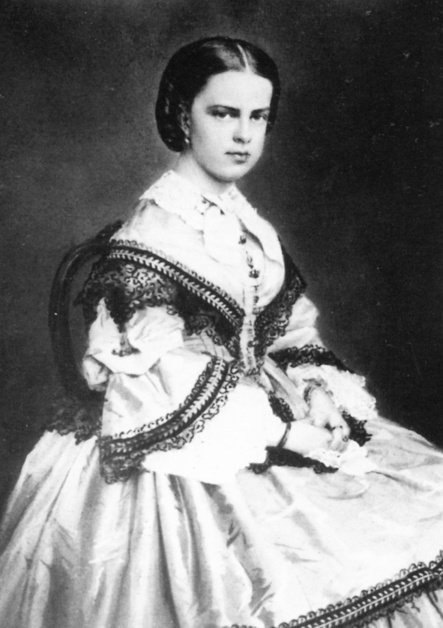
- Maria Clotilde c. 1857
- Born: 2 March 1843; Royal Palace of Turin, Turin, Kingdom of Sardinia
- Died: 25 June 1911 (aged 68); Castle of Moncalieri, Moncalieri, Italy
- Spouse: Prince Napoléon-Jérôme Bonaparte (m. 1859; died 1891)
- Issue: Victor, Prince Napoléon; Prince Louis; Princess Maria Letizia, Duchess of Aosta
Names
- Italian: Ludovica Teresa Maria Clotilde; French: Louise Thérèse Marie Clotilde
- House: Savoy
- Father: Victor Emmanuel II of Italy
- Mother: Adelaide of Austria
- Coat of arms of Princess Maria Clotilde of Savoy

Maria Clotilde of Savoy (Ludovica Teresa Maria Clotilde; 2 March 1843 – 25 June 1911) was born in Turin to Vittorio Emanuele II, later King of Italy and his first wife, Adelaide of Austria. She was the wife of Prince Napoléon-Jérôme Bonaparte. She was a member of the Third Order of Saint Dominic and has been declared a Servant of God by Pope Pius XII.

== Early life and ancestry ==
Maria Clotilde was the eldest of eight children born to Victor Emmanuel II, King of Sardinia by his first wife and cousin, Archduchess Adelaide of Austria. Her father would later become the king of a united Italy as Victor Emmanuel II.

Maria Clotilde's paternal grandparents were Charles Albert, King of Sardinia and Archduchess Maria Theresa of Austria.

Her maternal grandparents were Archduke Rainer Joseph of Austria and Princess Elisabeth of Savoy. Rainer was a younger son of Leopold II, Holy Roman Emperor.

== Marriage ==
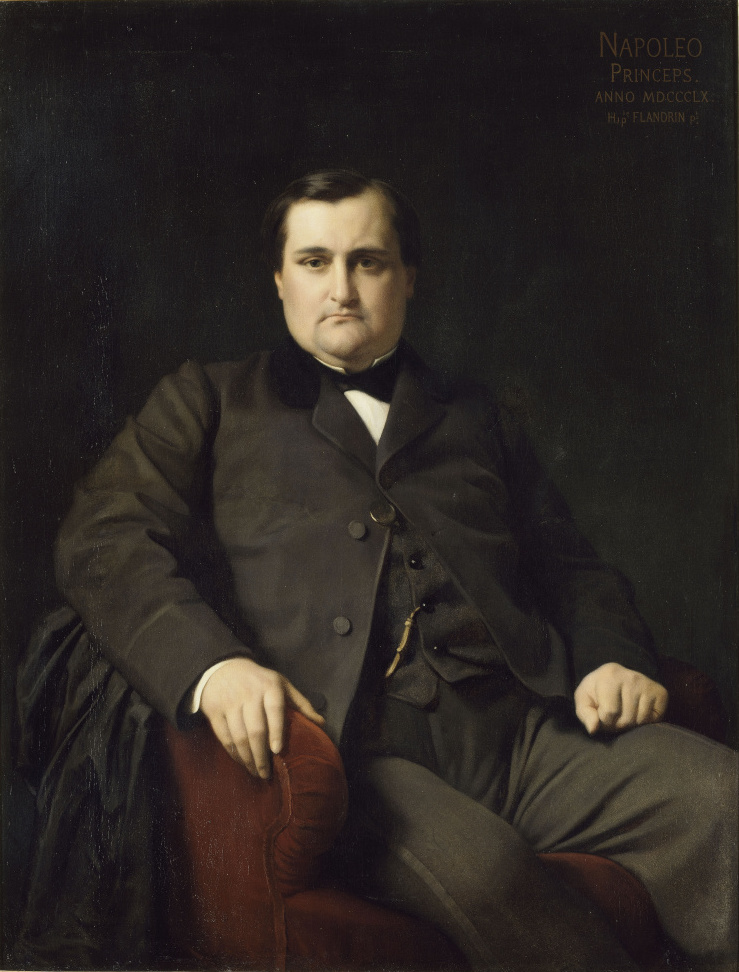
Maria Clotilde's husband Prince Napoléon-Jérôme Bonaparte.

On 30 January 1859, she was married in Turin to Prince Napoléon-Jérôme Bonaparte (1822–1891). They had three children:

Name	Birth	Death	Notes
Napoléon Victor Bonaparte	18 July 1862	3 May 1926	Married Princess Clémentine of Belgium, daughter of Leopold II of Belgium.
Prince Louis Bonaparte	16 July 1864	14 October 1932	Russian Lieutenant General and governor of Yerevan.
Maria Letizia Bonaparte	20 November 1866	25 October 1926	Married her uncle Amedeo (1845–1890), Duke of Aosta, and from 1870 until 1873, King of Spain.

=== Princess Napoléon ===
Their marriage was unhappy, particularly as Maria Clotilde preferred the quieter, more duty-filled life that she felt they should maintain, while Napoléon-Jérôme preferred the faster, more entertainment-filled lifestyle of the French Court. Another factor in their unhappy marriage was the circumstances leading up to their espousal. Maria Clotilde had been only 15 years old when they were married, while he was over 37. In the events leading up to their marriage, she had been vehemently against it and had unhappily agreed to it. The marriage had also been negotiated out of political reasons during the conference of Plombières (July 1858). As Maria Clotilde was too young at the time for marriage, Napoléon-Jérôme had to wait until the following year; many had disapproved of the speed he undertook collecting his young bride in Turin. Their marriage was often compared to that of an elephant and a gazelle; the bridegroom had strong Napoleonic features (broad, bulky, and ponderous) while the bride appeared frail, short, fair-haired, and with the characteristic nose of the House of Savoy.

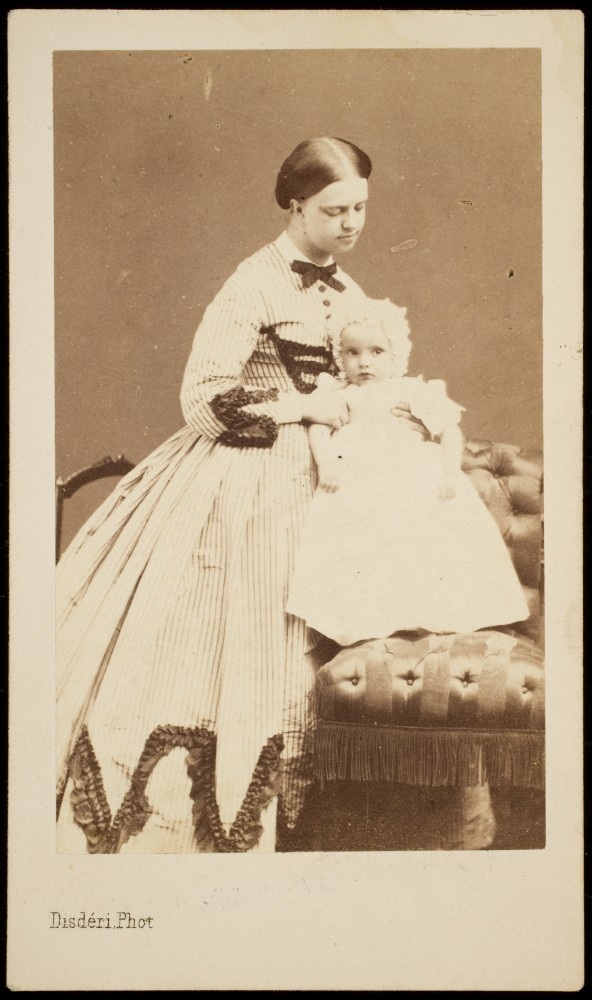
Maria Clotilde with one of her children, probably Victor (c. 1862–63)

Her husband was unfaithful, while she was active in charities. Maria Clotilde was described as proud, bigoted, and dutiful, yet "pious and modest." During a discussion of the proper way of dressing, Maria Clotilde pointed out to Empress Eugénie de Montijo that she should not forget that she was born and raised in a royal court. When Eugénie complained of the fatigue of the French Court on one occasion, Maria Clotilde replied, "We do not mind; you see, we are born to it".

The marriage was unpopular with both the French and the Italians; the latter in particular felt that the daughter of their king had been sacrificed to an unpopular member of the House of Bonaparte and consequently regarded it as a mésalliance. For France's part, Napoléon-Jérôme was ill-regarded and had been known to carry on a number of affairs both before and during his marriage. Their official reception into Paris on 4 February was greeted very coldly by Parisians, not out of disrespect for a daughter of the king of Sardinia, but out of dislike for her new husband. Indeed, all her life, public sympathy tended to lean in her favour; she was fondly regarded as retiring, charitable, pious, and trapped in an unhappy marriage.

With her husband, she travelled to the United States in 1861 and to Egypt and the Holy Land in 1863. While in the United States, she travelled on the newly completed main line of the Illinois Central Railroad, where the village of Savoy, Illinois, was named in her honour.

=== Fall of French Empire ===
After the fall of the Second French Empire in 1870, Maria Clotilde had initially refused to leave Paris when the revolution broke out, because of her sense of what was suitable for a princess from the House of Savoy, which was to stay on her post. They were forced to flee, however, and their family enjoyed a beautiful estate in the town of Prangins near Lake Geneva that they resided in.

=== Turin ===
After Maria Clotilde's father Victor Emmanuel died in 1878, she returned to Turin, Italy without her husband. During this period, their daughter (Maria Letizia) mostly resided with her mother in the Castle of Moncalieri, but her two sons stayed mainly with their father. It was in Italy that their mother withdrew herself from society to dedicate herself to religion and various charities.

After the revolution, she lived the rest of her life in Moncalieri (located outside of Turin), where she spent her days devoting herself to religion. She lived in retirement from the world for the following 20 years until her death at the age of 68 in Moncalieri. She was buried there, and the funeral was given regal honours. It was attended by Victor Emmanuel III of Italy, Queen Elena, and others.

== Beatification process ==
Servant of God Maria Clotilde of Savoy TOSD
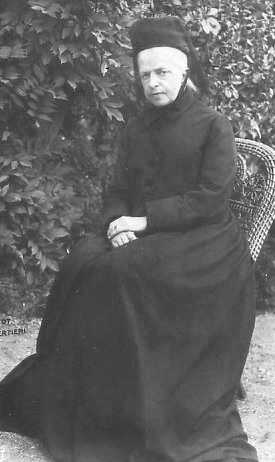

In 1936 the cause of beatification Maria Clotilde was introduced by Maurilio Fossati, Archbishop of Turin. Her spiritual writings were approved by theologians on 28 February 1940. On 10 July 1942 Pope Pius XII declared the princess a Servant of God.

== Honours ==
- Kingdom of Italy : Dame Grand Cross of the Order of Saints Maurice and Lazarus.
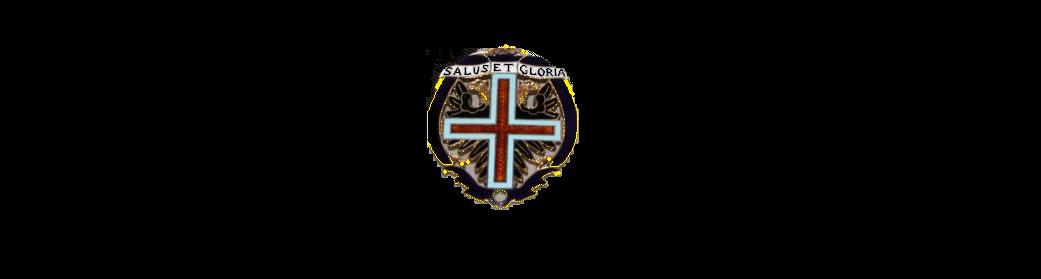
- Austria-Hungary : Dame of the Order of the Starry Cross.

== Ancestry ==
Ancestors of Princess Maria Clotilde of Savoy

8. Charles Emmanuel, Prince of Carignano
4. Charles Albert of Sardinia
9. Princess Maria Christina of Saxony
2. Victor Emmanuel II of Italy
10. Ferdinand III of Tuscany
5. Archduchess Maria Theresa of Austria
11. Princess Luisa of Naples and Sicily
1. Princess Maria Clotilde of Savoy
12. Leopold II, Holy Roman Emperor
6. Archduke Rainer Joseph of Austria
13. Infanta Maria Luisa of Spain
3. Archduchess Adelaide of Austria
14. Charles Emmanuel, Prince of Carignano (= 8)
7. Princess Elisabeth of Savoy
15. Princess Maria Christina of Saxony (= 9)

== Sources ==
- Remsen Whitehouse, Henry (1897). The Sacrifice of a Throne: Being an Account of the Life of Amadeus, Duke of Aosta, sometime King of Spain. New York: Bonnel, Silver, and Co.
- Vizetelly, Ernest Alfred (1907). The Court of the Tuileries, 1852-1870: Its Organization, Chief Personages, Splendour, Frivolity, and Downfall. London: William Clowes and Sons, Limited.
