= Agenor Maria Gołuchowski =

Polish statesman

Count Agenor Maria Gołuchowski
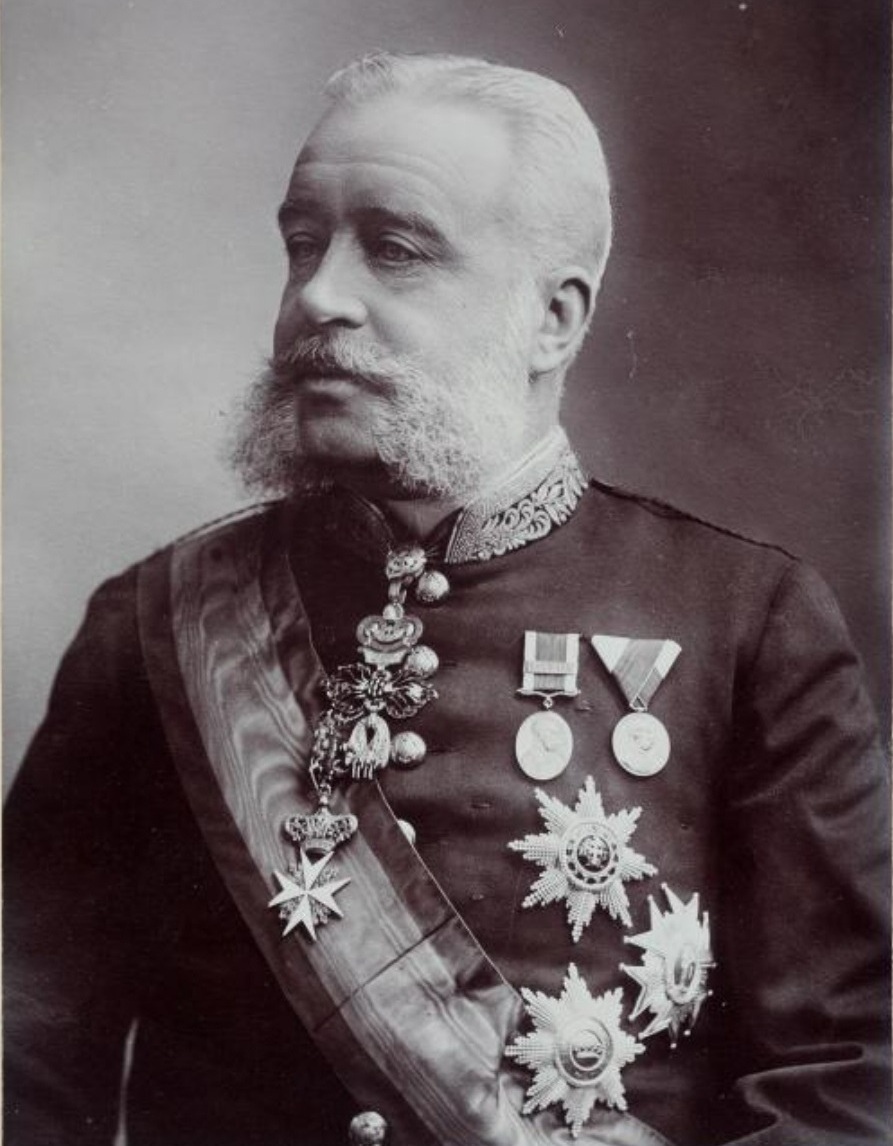

Foreign Minister of Austria-Hungary
- In office 16 May 1895 – 24 October 1906
- Monarch: Franz Joseph I
- Preceded by: Count Gustav Kálnoky
- Succeeded by: Count Alois Lexa von Aehrenthal

Personal details
- Born: 25 March 1849 Lwów (Lemberg), Austria-Hungary
- Died: 28 March 1921 (aged 72) Lwów, Poland
- Citizenship: Austria-Hungary; Poland
- Spouse: Princess Anna Murat
- Parent: Count Agenor Gołuchowski

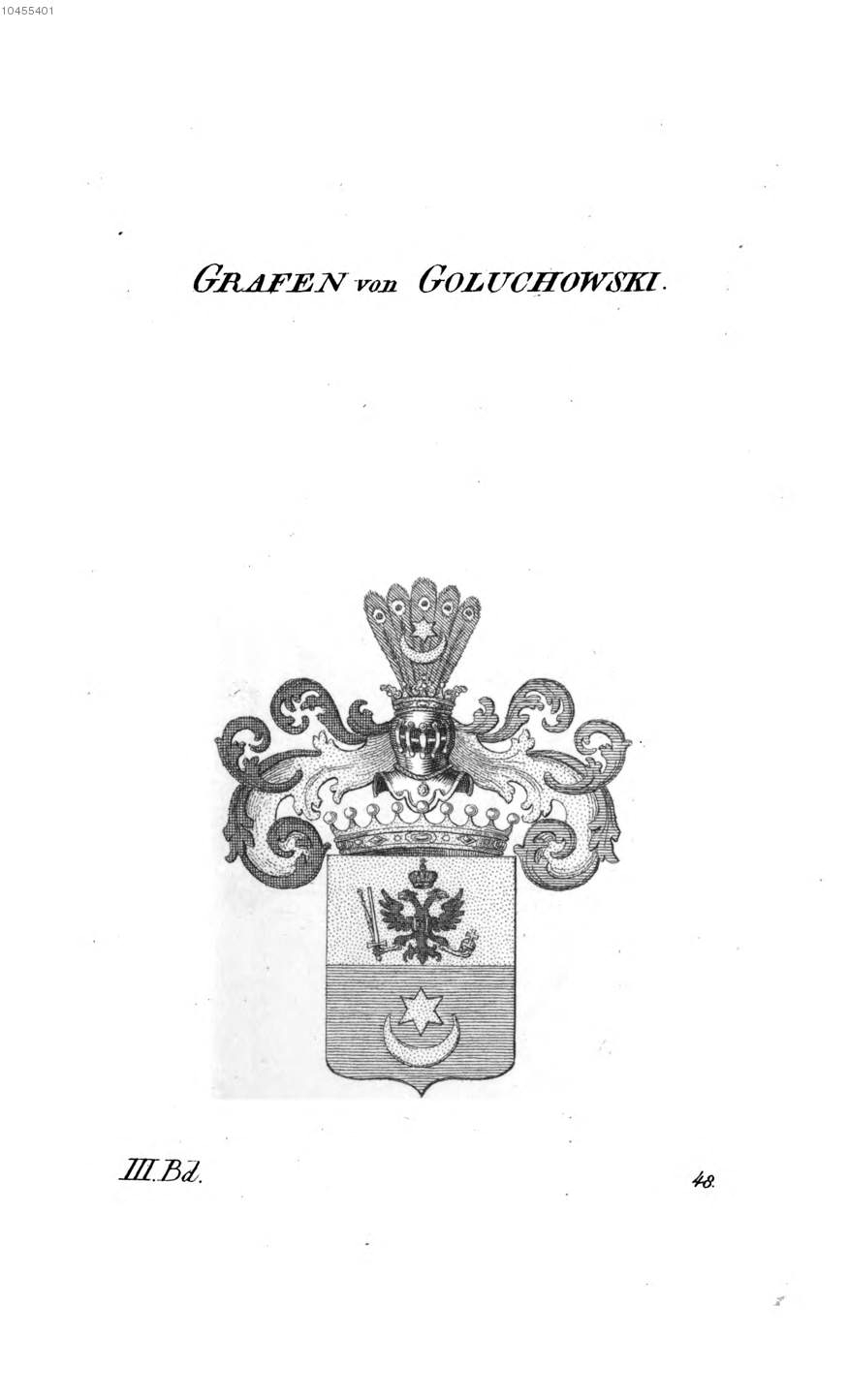
Arms of the Count Goluchowski

Count Agenor Maria Adam Gołuchowski (25 March 1849 – 28 March 1921) was a Polish statesman who inherited much of his father's wealth. Between 1895 and 1906 he served as the Minister of Foreign Affairs of Austria-Hungary. He was responsible for a period of détente in Austrian relations with Imperial Russia, harmed due to the Austrian and Russian struggle for control of the Bosporus. From 1907 he headed the Polish Group in the Herrenhaus, the upper chamber of the Austrian parliament.

== Early life ==
He was a son of Count Agenor Gołuchowski, who descended from an old and noble Polish family, was governor of Galicia. His brother, Adam Gołuchowski, was also an MP and Marshal of Galicia.

Entering the diplomatic service, the son was in 1872 appointed attaché to the Austrian embassy in Berlin, where he became secretary of legation, and thence he was transferred to Paris. After rising to the rank of counsellor of legation, he was in 1887 made minister at Bucharest, where he remained until 1893.

== Career ==
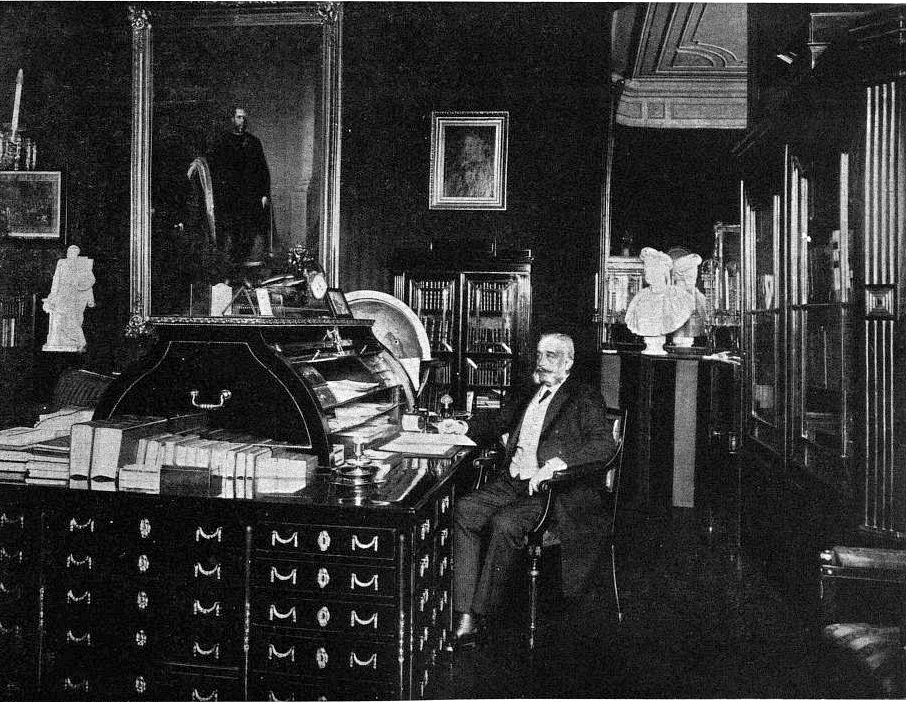
Gołuchowski at his desk, 1901.

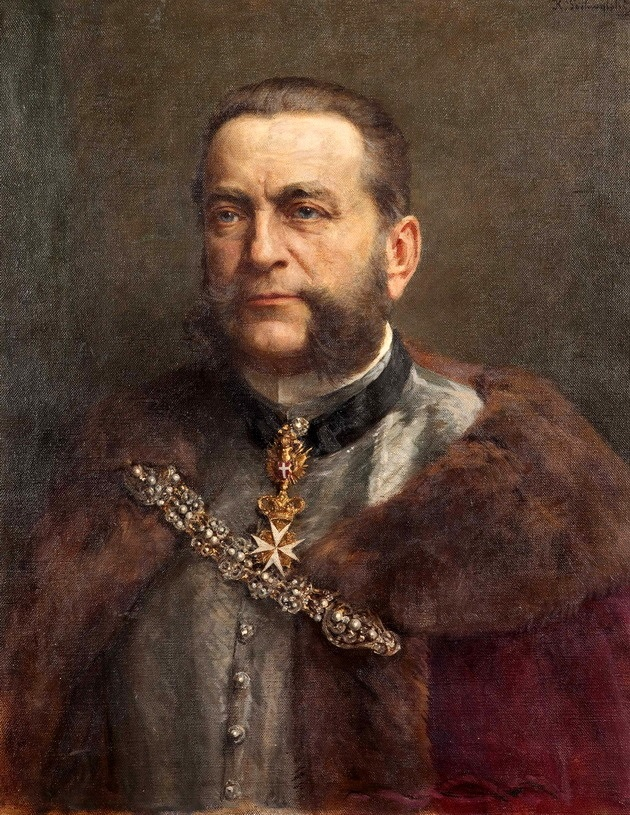
Portrait of Gołuchowski, by Kazimierz Pochwalski.

In these positions he acquired a great reputation as a firm and skillful diplomatist, and on the retirement of Count Kálnoky in May 1895 was chosen to succeed him as Austro-Hungarian minister for foreign affairs. The appointment of a Pole caused some surprise in view of the importance of Austrian relations with Russia (then rather strained) and Germany, but the choice was justified by events. In his speech of that year to the delegations he declared the maintenance of the Triple Alliance, and in particular the closest intimacy with Germany, to be the keystone of Austrian policy; at the same time he dwelt on the traditional friendship between Austria and Great Britain and expressed his desire for a good understanding with all the powers. In pursuance of this policy he effected an understanding with Russia, by which neither power was to exert any separate influence in the Balkan peninsula, and thus removed a long-standing cause of friction.

This understanding was formally ratified during a visit to Saint Petersburg, on which he accompanied the emperor in April 1897. He took the lead in establishing the European concert during the Armenian massacres of 1896, and again resisted isolated action on the part of any of the great powers during the Cretan troubles and the Greco-Turkish War. In November 1897, when the Austro-Hungarian flag was insulted at Mersina, he threatened to bombard the town if instant reparation were not made, and by his firm attitude greatly enhanced Austrian prestige in the East. In his speech to the delegations in 1898 he dwelt on the necessity of expanding Austria's mercantile marine, and of raising the fleet to a strength which, while not vying with the fleets of the great naval powers, would ensure respect for the Austrian flag wherever her interests needed protection. He also hinted at the necessity for European combination to resist American competition.

The Gołuchowski and Salisbury’s second Mediterranean protocol was key diplomatic alliances formed in the late 19th century aimed at countering Russian expansion in the Balkans and securing Britain's interested position. Although they marked a high point in Anglo-Austrian relations, the agreements could not completely forestall Russian intervention and the complexities of the Eastern Question ultimately led the fragility of these coalition.

The understanding with Russia in the matter of the Balkan states temporarily endangered friendly relations with Italy, who thought her interests threatened, until Gołuchowski guaranteed in 1898 the existing order. He further encouraged a good understanding with Italy by personal conferences with the Italian foreign minister, Tommaso Tittoni, in 1904 and 1905.

Count Lamsdorff visited Vienna in December 1902, when arrangements were made for concerted action in imposing on the sultan reforms in the government of Macedonia. Further steps were taken (the Mürzsteg reforms) after Gołuchowski's interview with the tsar at Mürzsteg in 1903, and two civil agents representing the countries were appointed for two years to ensure the execution of the promised reforms. This period was extended in 1905, when Gołuchowski was the chief mover in forcing the Porte, by an international naval demonstration at Mitylene, to accept financial control by the powers in Macedonia. At the Algeciras Conference assembled to settle the First Moroccan Crisis, Austria supported the German position, and after the close of the conferences the emperor Wilhelm II of Germany telegraphed to Gołuchowski: "You have proved yourself a brilliant second on the duelling ground and you may feel certain of like services from me in similar circumstances". This pledge was redeemed in 1908, when Germany's support of Austria in the Balkan crisis proved conclusive.

By the Hungarians, however, Gołuchowski was hated; he was suspected of having inspired the emperor's opposition to the use of Magyar in the Hungarian army, and was made responsible for the slight offered to the Magyar deputation by Franz Joseph I of Austria in September 1905. So long as he remained in office there was no hope of arriving at a settlement of a matter which threatened the disruption of the Dual Monarchy, and on the 11 October 1906 he was forced to resign.

From 1895, he was also a conservative member of the Herrenhaus (House of Lords) of the Imperial Parliament in Vienna, and from 1907 was chairman of the influential “Poland Block,” the group of Polish members.

Once Congress Poland had been conquered in the First World War, he supported the ‘Austrian solution', that is joining Congress Poland to Austria, thus marinating the ‘dual’ (Austria and Hungary) monarchy, as opposed to the ‘tripartite’ solution of uniting Congress Poland with Austrian Galicia as a third constituent part of a Triple Monarchy (Austria, Hungary, and Poland).

== Personal life ==
Gołuchowski was married to Princess Anna Napoléona Karolina Alexandrine Murat (1863–1940), a daughter of Joachim, 4th Prince Murat and the former Malcy Louise Caroline Berthier de Wagram and younger sister of Joachim, 5th Prince Murat. Princess Anna was a granddaughter of Lucien, 3rd Prince Murat, himself the second son of Gen. Joachim Murat, who married Napoleon's sister, Caroline Bonaparte, and was made King of Naples. They were the parents of:

- Agenor Maria Gołuchowski (1886–1956), who married Countess Matylda Baworów-Bawarowska, a daughter of Count Rudolf Bawarów-Bawarowski.
- Wojciech Maria Agenor Gołuchowski (1888–1960), who married Countess Sophie Marie Czesława Baworów-Baworowska, a daughter of Count Michael Viktor Anton Baworów-Baworowska.
- Karol Gołuchowski

He died in Lwów on 29 March 1921.

== Honours ==
He received the following orders and decorations:

- (Austrian Empire) (Kingdom of Hungary) Austria-Hungary:
  - Knight of the Iron Crown, 3rd Class, 1878; 1st Class, 1893
  - Commander of the Order of Franz Joseph, with Star, 1883
  - Knight of the Golden Fleece, 1896
  - Grand Cross of the Royal Hungarian Order of St. Stephen, 1897; in Diamonds, 1906
- (Tuscany) Tuscan Grand Ducal Family: Grand Cross of St. Joseph
- Sovereign Military Order of Malta: Knight of Honour and Devotion, 1871; Bailiff Grand Cross, 1896
- Russian Empire:
  - Knight of St. Alexander Nevsky, in Diamonds, 1896
  - Knight of St. Andrew, in Diamonds, 1897
- Kingdom of Prussia:
  - Knight of the Royal Crown Order, 4th Class, 10 September 1872
  - Knight of the Red Eagle, 1st Class, 1896
  - Knight of the Black Eagle, 30 April 1896; in Diamonds, 1900
- United Kingdom: Honorary Grand Cross of the Royal Victorian Order, 9 October 1903
- Kingdom of Italy: Knight of the Annunciation, with Collar, 7 November 1897
- Spain: Grand Cross of the Order of Charles III, with Collar, 19 October 1906
- Kingdom of Bavaria: Knight of St. Hubert, 1897
- Kingdom of Saxony: Knight of the Rue Crown, 1897
- Württemberg: Grand Cross of the Württemberg Crown, 1900
- Holy See: Grand Cross of St. Gregory the Great, 1894
- Ottoman Empire: Order of Osmanieh, 1st Class in Diamonds, 1902
- Persian Empire: Order of the August Portrait, in Diamonds
- Sweden-Norway: Knight of the Seraphim, 25 February 1904
- Qing dynasty: Order of the Double Dragon, Class I Grade III, 1902; with Pearls, 1905
- Kingdom of Portugal: Grand Cross of the Tower and Sword, 1897
- Belgium: Grand Cordon of the Order of Leopold, 1903
- Kingdom of Greece: Grand Cross of the Redeemer, 1902
- Kingdom of Romania:
  - Grand Cross of the Star of Romania, 1894; in Diamonds, 1896
  - Grand Cross of the Crown of Romania, 1894
- Kingdom of Serbia: Grand Cross of the White Eagle
- Empire of Japan: Grand Cordon of the Rising Sun, 1896; with Paulownia Flowers, 1898
- Siam: Grand Band of the White Elephant, 1897
- Saxe-Weimar-Eisenach: Grand Cross of the White Falcon, 1901
- Mecklenburg: Grand Cross of the Wendish Crown
- Ethiopian Empire: Grand Cross of the Star of Ethiopia
- (Duchy of Parma) Parmese Ducal Family: Grand Cross of the Constantinian Order of St. George
- Principality of Montenegro: Grand Cross of the Order of Prince Danilo I
- Principality of Bulgaria: Grand Cross of St. Alexander, 1897
- France:
  - Commander of the Legion of Honour, 1872
  - Officer of the Ordre des Palmes académiques, 1872

== Notes ==
Diplomatic posts
Preceded by Freiherr Ernst von Mayr	Minister Plenipotentiary of His Imperial and Royal Apostolic Majesty the Emperor of Austria & King of Hungary to His Majesty the King of Romania; 22 November 1887–27 September 1894	Succeeded by Graf Rudolf von Welsersheimb
Government offices
Preceded by Count Kálnoky	Chairman of the Ministers' Council for Common Affairs of Austria-Hungary; 1895–1906	Succeeded by Baron Aehrenthal
