= Joachim, 6th Prince Murat =

Joachim Murat
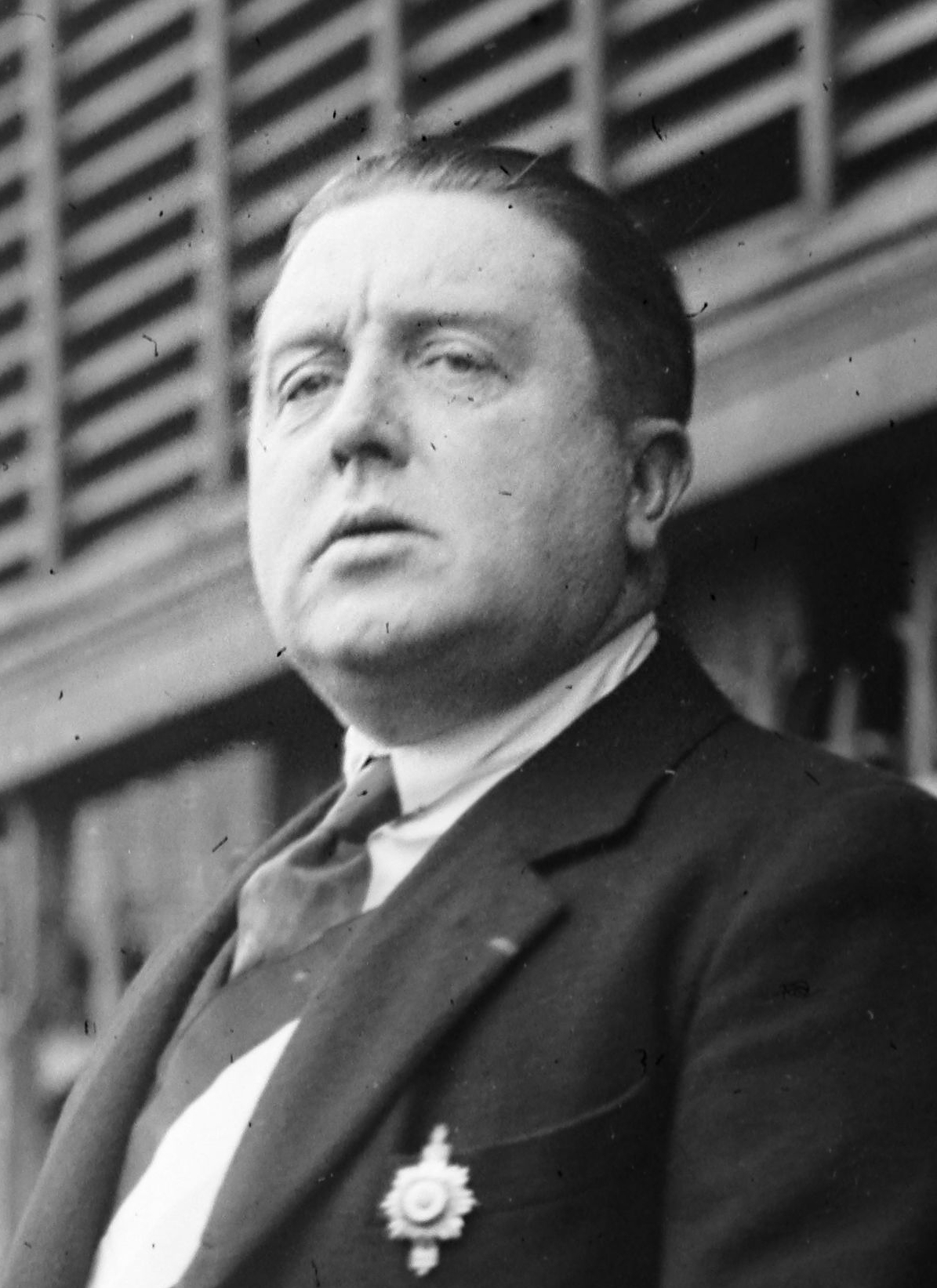
- Prince Joachim Murat while giving a speech during the feast of Joan of Arc in Rouen, 1922.

Prince Murat
- Tenure: 2 November 1932 – 11 May 1938
- Predecessor: Joachim, 5th Prince Murat
- Successor: Joachim, 7th Prince Murat
- Born: 6 August 1885; Paris, Île-de-France, France
- Died: 11 May 1938 (aged 52); Paris, Île-de-France, France
- Spouse: Louise Amélie Plantie (m. 1927)
- Issue: Joachim, 7th Prince Murat; Princess Caroline Murat
- Father: Joachim, 5th Prince Murat
- Mother: Marie Cecile Ney

Joachim Napoléon Michel Murat, 6th Prince Murat (6 August 1885, in Paris, Île-de-France, France – 11 May 1938, in Paris), was a member of the Bonaparte-Murat family.

== Biography ==
His parents were Joachim, 5th Prince Murat and Marie Cécile Ney d'Elchingen, great-granddaughter of Marshal Michel Ney. As heir to the princely title of Murat, he used the courtesy title of Prince of Pontecorvo until he succeeded his father in 1932.

In 1914 Murat served as a lieutenant of cavalry following the outbreak of World War I. He became an official interpreter to the General Headquarters of the Royal Flying Corps (RFC), based at Saint-Omer from August 1914 to November 1915. One of his British colleagues at St-Omer was Maurice Baring, a lieutenant in the RFC, assistant to General David Henderson and later Hugh Trenchard. Murat is frequently mentioned in Baring's memoirs..

He subsequently commanded the Fort des Sartelles during the Battle of Verdun in 1916, where his conduct earned him the Croix de Guerre with three citations.

After the war he was elected député for the Lot in the 1919 French legislative election of 16 November in Labastide-Murat. He was aligned with the National Bloc coalition, symbolised by the blue-grey uniforms (Bleu Horizon [fr]) worn by the 'poilus' in the war. The coalition represented the conservative old soldiers and their desire to "make Germany pay".

During this XIIth parliamentary session, he was a member of the Alsace-Lorraine commission [fr], the Algerian commission and for the colonies and protectorates, the commission for the fr:French Merchant Navy, and that of Customs and National Conventions.

During the session of 22 January 1920 he raised the matter of Léon Accambray [fr], whose espionage for the Germans during World War I was only fully discovered in the 1960s.

Although he was defeated in the 1924 elections and lost his seat, he continued to support the Appel au peuple parliamentary group as the representative of Napoléon in the Bonapartiste movement. He died in Paris on 11 May 1938.

== Family life ==
On 13 December 1927, he married in Colombes, France, Louise Amélie Plantié, daughter of Eugène Plantié, Prefect of Constantine, and granddaughter of Jean-Baptiste Plantié, Senator of Basses-Pyrénées. They had two children:

1. Joachim, 7th Prince Murat (1920–1944) (shot in 1944 while fighting for the French Resistance)
2. Princess Caroline Murat (1921–2003)

== Ancestry ==
Ancestors of Joachim, 6th Prince Murat

16. Joachim Murat, King of Naples
8. Prince Napoleon Lucien Charles Murat
17. Caroline Bonaparte
4. Joachim, 4th Prince Murat
18. Thomas Fraser
9. Georgina Fraser
19. Anne Lawton
2. Joachim, 5th Prince Murat
20. Louis-Alexandre Berthier, prince de Neuchâtel et Valangin, prince de Wagram
10. Napoléon Alexandre Berthier, 2nd Prince of Wagram
21. Duchess Maria Elisabeth in Bavaria
5. Princess Malcy Louise Caroline Berthier de Wagram
22. Count Nicolas Clary
11. Countess Zénaide Françoise Clary
23. Anne Rouyer
1. Joachim, 6th Prince Murat
24. Michel Ney, Duke of Elchingen
12. Michel Louis Félix Ney, 2nd Duc d'Elchingen
25. Aglaé Louise Auguié
6. Michel Aloys Ney, 3rd Duc d'Elchingen
26. Joseph Souham, Comte Souham et de l'Empire
13. Countess Marie Joséphine Souham
27. Anne Rosalie Desperiez
3. Marie Cécile Michelle Ney d'Elchingen
28. Élie Furtado-Fould
14. Paul Furtado-Fould
29. Rose Fould
7. Paule Marguérite Furtado-Heine
15. Marie Julie Morel

French nobility of the First French Empire
Preceded by Joachim, 5th Prince Murat	Prince of Pontecorvo; 1901–1932	Succeeded by Joachim, 7th Prince Murat
Preceded by Joachim, 5th Prince Murat	Prince Murat; 1932–1938	Succeeded by Joachim, 7th Prince Murat
