= Louis Napoléon Murat =

French naval officer

Prince Louis Napoléon Murat

Personal details
- Born: Louis Napoléon Murat; 22 December 1851 Paris, France
- Died: 22 September 1912 (aged 60) Paris, France
- Spouse: Eudoxia Mikhailovna Somova (m. 1873)
- Children: Prince Eugène Murat; Prince Oscar Murat; Prince Michel Murat
- Parents: Lucien Murat (father); Caroline Fraser (mother)

Military service
- Allegiance: France; Sweden
- Branch/service: French Navy; Swedish Navy
- Rank: Lieutenant
- Battles/wars: Franco-Prussian War

Prince Louis Napoléon Murat (22 December 1851 – 22 September 1912) was a French military officer and member of the House of Murat.

== Early life ==
Murat was born on 22 December 1851 in Passy, France, the youngest child of Lucien Charles Joseph Napoléon, 3rd Prince Murat, and Caroline Georgina Fraser, former governess at the residence of Joseph Bonaparte in Bordentown, New Jersey. He was a grandson of Caroline Bonaparte, sister of Napoleon, and the godson of Napoléon III.

== Career ==
Murat began his military career in the French Navy in 1869. Following the Franco-Prussian War in 1870, he left to join the Swedish Navy. There, he was commissioned as a lieutenant and served as aide-de-camp to both Charles XV and Oscar II until his marriage in 1873.

Murat represented France at the 1900 Summer Olympics in the equestrian jumping and equestrian dressage events.

== Personal life ==
Murat married Eudoxia Mikhailovna Somova (1850–1924), widow of Prince Alexander Orbeliani, in Odessa in 1873. They had three sons:

- Prince Eugène Louis Michel Joachim Napoléon (1875–1906), who married Violette Ney, daughter of Michel Aloys Ney, 3rd Duke of Elchingen, and died in an automobile accident in 1906.
- Prince Oscar Charles Joachim (1876–1884), who died young.
- Prince Michel Anne Charles Joachim Napoléon (1887–1941), who married Helena MacDonald Stallo, heiress to the Standard Oil fortune, in 1913. Michel is the grandfather of the actor René Auberjonois

Murat died in hospital in Paris on 22 September 1912 following a surgical operation.

== Ancestry ==
Ancestors of Louis Napoléon Murat

16. Guillaume Murat
8. Pierre Murat-Jordy
17. Marguerite Herbeil
4. Joachim, King of Naples
18. Pierre Loubières
9. Jeanne Loubières
19. Jeanne Viellescazes
2. Lucien, 3rd Prince Murat
20. Giuseppe Maria Buonaparte
10. Carlo Buonaparte
21. Maria Saveria Paravicini
5. Caroline Bonaparte
22. Giovanni Geronimo Ramolino
11. Letizia Ramolino
23. Angela Maria Pietrasanta
1. Louis Napoléon Murat
3. Caroline Georgina Fraser
