= Château de Chambly (Oise) =

French château

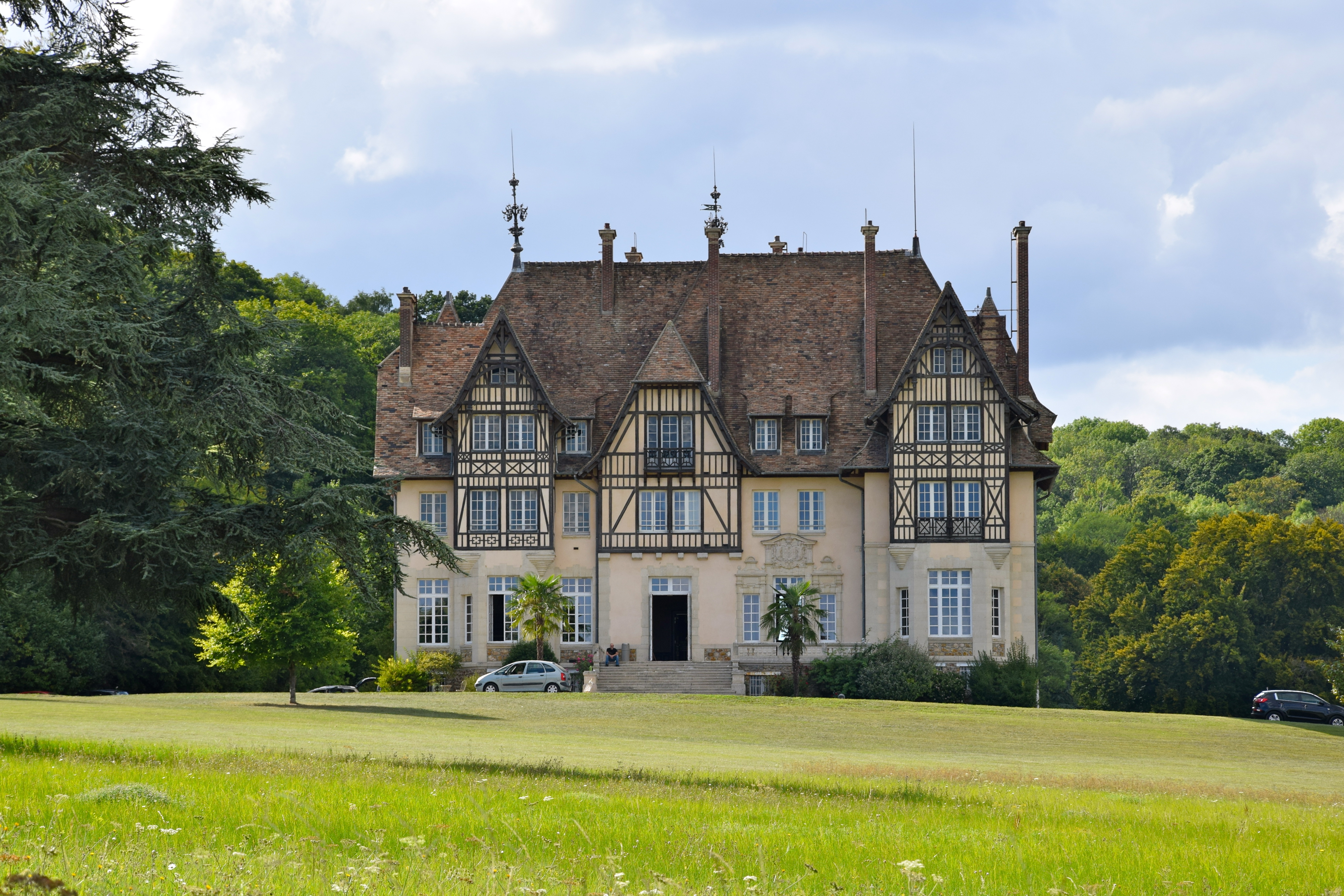
- September 2019
- Interactive map of the Château de Chambly area

General information
- Location: Chambly, Oise, France
- Coordinates: 49°09′20″N 02°13′39″E
- Client: Joachim, 5th Prince Murat

Design and construction
- Architects: Blondel and Langlois

Website
- www.chateau-chambly.com

The Château de Chambly is a historic château on rue d'Amblaincourt that is located in the commune of Chambly, in the French department of Oise in the Hauts-de-France region. Part of the park extends over the commune of Ronquerolles, in the Val-d'Oise department.

== History ==
A prior château on the estate, located below the current, was named Petimus and, in 1620, belonged to François de L'Hospital, Governor of the Bastille. Today, only a chapel built by Claude Le Picard in 1670 remains standing.

=== Prince Murat ===
In 1887, Baron Camont de Valence and Marie de Beaumont sold the former estates of Petimus and Evosseaux to Joachim Murat, 5th Prince Murat, (Note: Joachim, 5th Prince Murat, the son of Joachim, 4th Prince Murat and Malcy Louise Caroline Berthier de Wagram, was the grandson of Lucien, 3rd Prince Murat, himself the son of Joachim Murat, the 1st Prince Murat, Grand Duke of Berg and King of Naples, and his Queen consort Caroline Bonaparte (sister to Napoleon Bonaparte).) and his wife, Cécile Ney d'Echingen (a great-granddaughter of Marshal Ney). Prince Murat tore down the original château and hired French architects Blondel et Langlois to design and build his Anglo-Norman style château. He also had an English-style park designed by the landscape architect Duchene. Prince Murat, who was passionate about hunting, built large stables, a number of outbuildings (built in 1896) and a small stud farm built on the grounds. Prince Murat was master of the Hunt (Equipage) known as the Rallye-Champly. His father, Joachim, 4th Prince Murat, died at the chateau in 1901.

During the World War I, the château and its outbuildings served as an auxiliary hospital. During World War II, the château was occupied by the Germans after which it was left abandoned.

=== Simonet ===
In 1977, the château was acquired by local industrialist Pierre Simonet, who restored the property. The château remains owned by his descendants to this day. Besides renting the château for use as a filming location, they host weddings and equestrian events on the estate, managed by Simonet's granddaughter, Claire Flavian.

== In popular culture ==
Since the early 2000s, the château and its park have been regularly used as a filming location.

=== Films ===
- Camille Rewinds
- Dumas
- On War
- The Tiger Brigades
- The Art of Breaking Up, based on Un fil à la patte
- Arsène Lupin
- An Almost Peaceful World
- Vidocq

=== TV movies ===
- The Haunted Armchair by Claude Chabrol
- The List by Christian Faure
- Marie Besnard, by Christian Faure
- Mata Hari, The Real Story

== Gallery ==
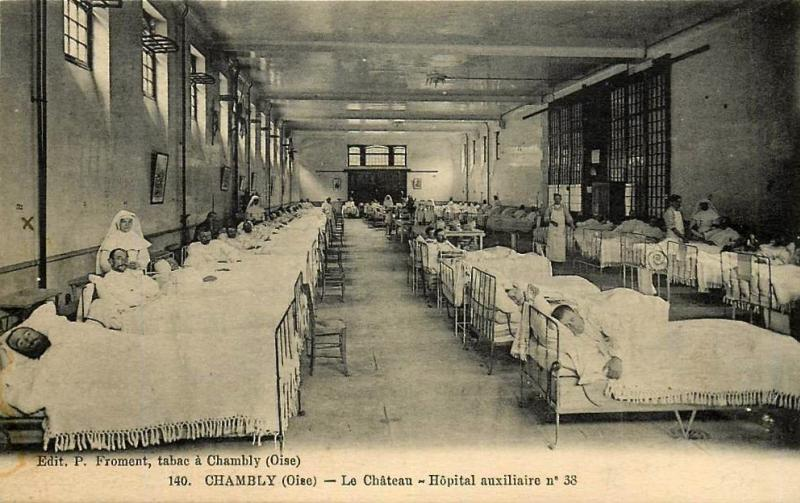
Old postcard when the château was used as a military hospital

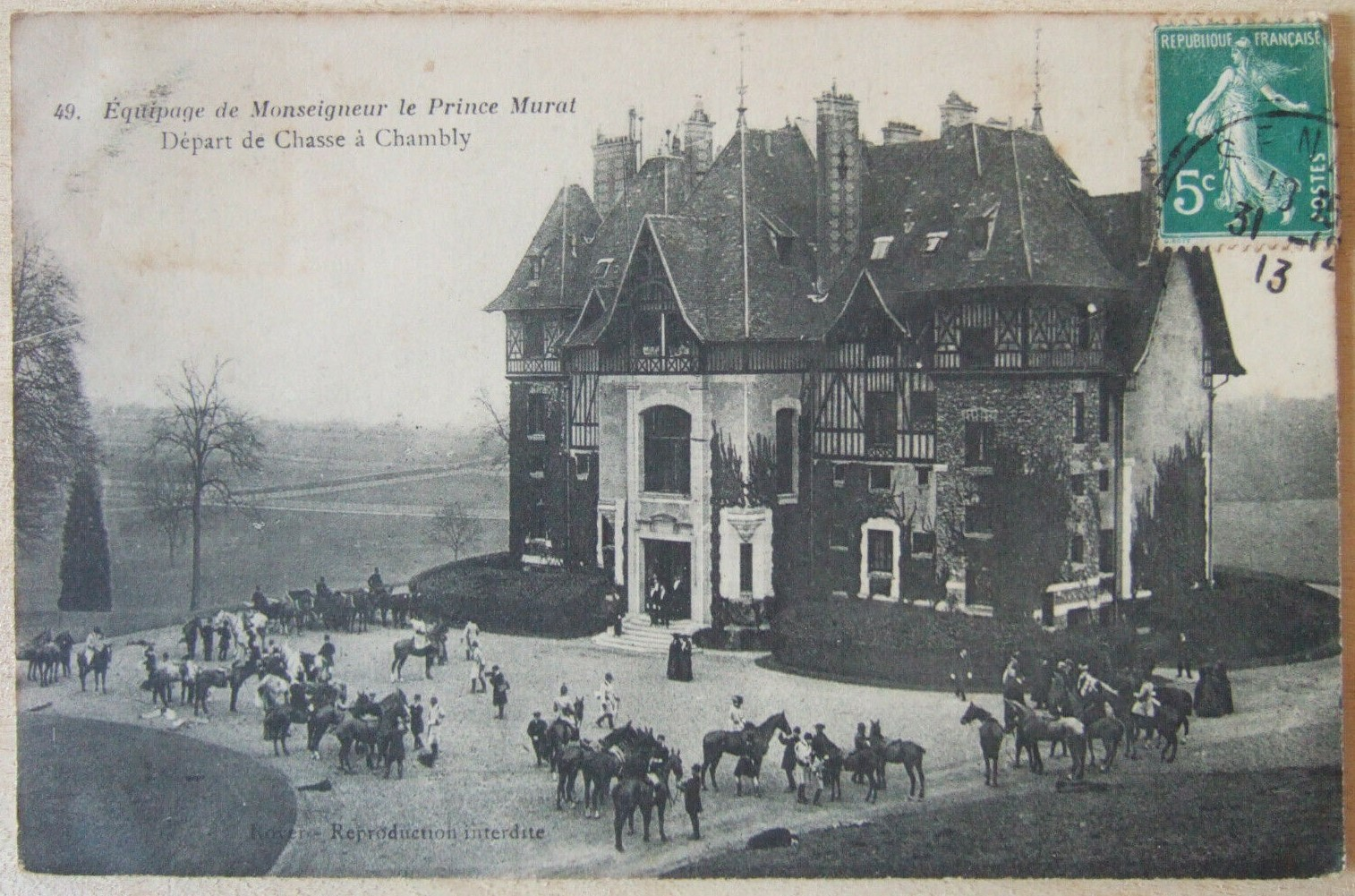
Old postcard with the hunting crew of Prince Murat

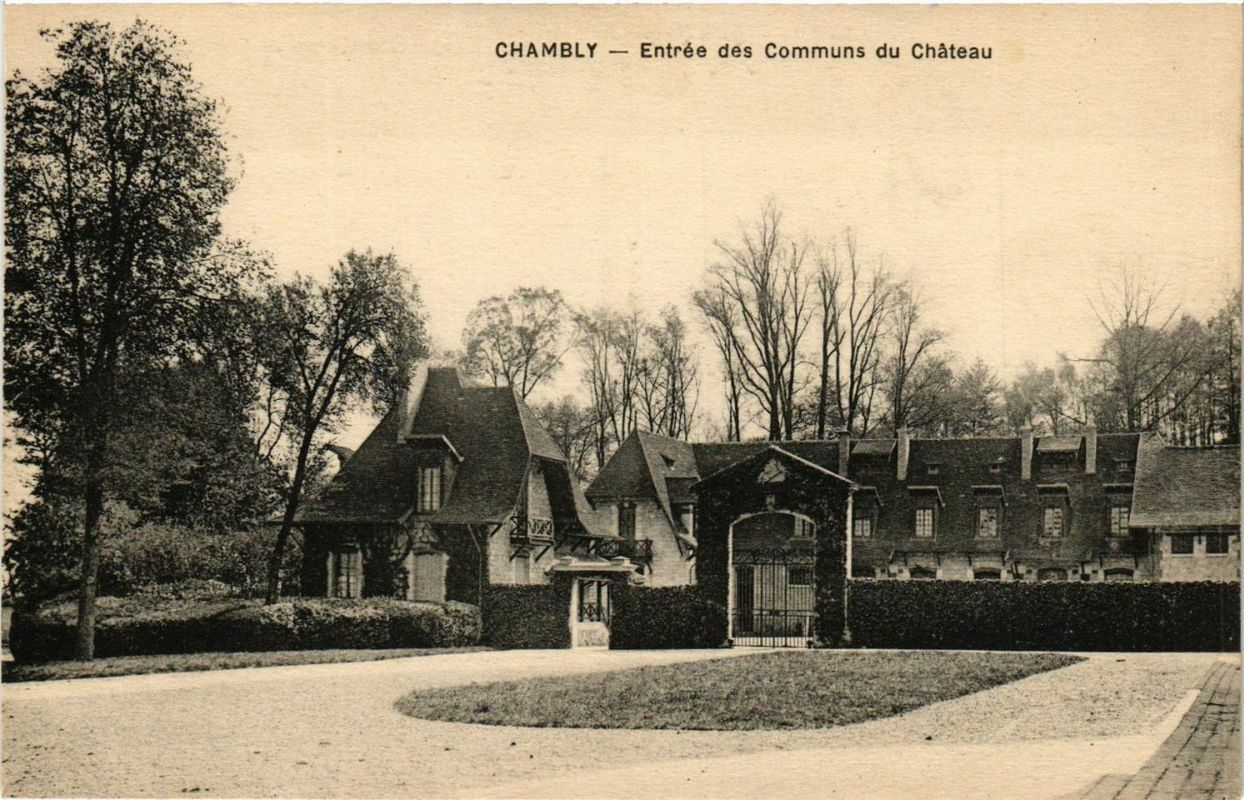
Entrance to the château's commons

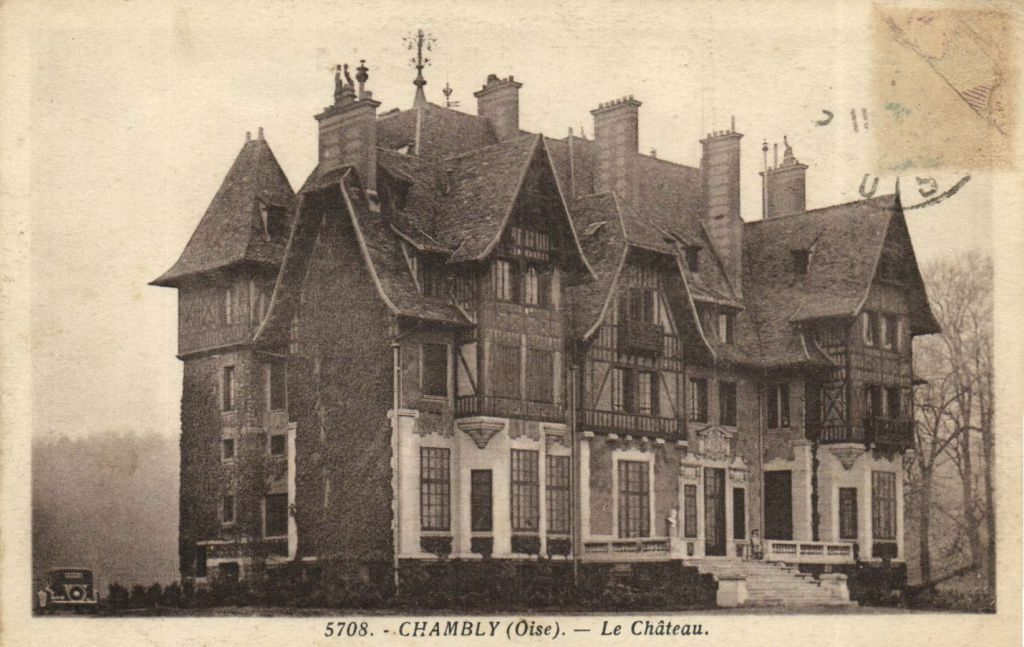
Old postcard

== See also ==
- List of castles in France
