= Les Misérables (2026 film) =

2026 French action drama film

- Theatrical release poster
- Directed by: Fred Cavayé
- Written by: Fred Cavayé
- Based on: Les Misérables by Victor Hugo
- Produced by: Olivier Delbosc; Richard Grandpierre
- Starring: Vincent Lindon; Tahar Rahim; Noémie Merlant
- Cinematography: Denis Rouden
- Edited by: Mickaël Dumontier
- Music by: Christophe Julien
- Production companies: Curiosa Films; Eskwad; TF1 Films Production; StudioCanal
- Distributed by: StudioCanal
- Release dates: 18 September 2026 (Zinemaldia); 14 October 2026 (France)
- Running time: 178 minutes
- Country: France
- Language: French
- Budget: €37 million

Les Misérables is a 2026 French drama film written and directed by Fred Cavayé, an adaptation of the 1862 novel by Victor Hugo. The film follows Jean Valjean (Vincent Lindon), who after 19 years in prison, seeks redemption while being relentlessly pursued by Inspector Javert (Tahar Rahim).

The film had its world premiere in competition at the 74th San Sebastián International Film Festival on 18 September 2026, where it competed for Golden Shell. It will be theatrically released in France by StudioCanal on 14 October.

== Synopsis ==
This film's narrative is focusing on the character of Jean Valjean in this adaptation.

Jean Valjean spends 19 years in prison for stealing a loaf of bread, and the experience leaves him tough and bitter. After his release, he tries to turn his life around by taking on a new identity and becoming a respected member of society. He promises Fantine, a factory worker who is dying and will no longer be able to care for her daughter, that he will save and care for her daughter Cosette, who is being mistreated by the Thénardier family. Valjean raises Cosette as his own child, but Inspector Javert keeps chasing him, determined to prove Valjean is still a criminal.

As France faces growing unrest and the city moves toward revolution, the lives of Valjean, Cosette, Marius, and Javert become tightly connected. Through hardship, courage, and his desire to do what is right, Valjean continues his search for redemption and tries to give Cosette a life filled with love and freedom.

== Cast ==
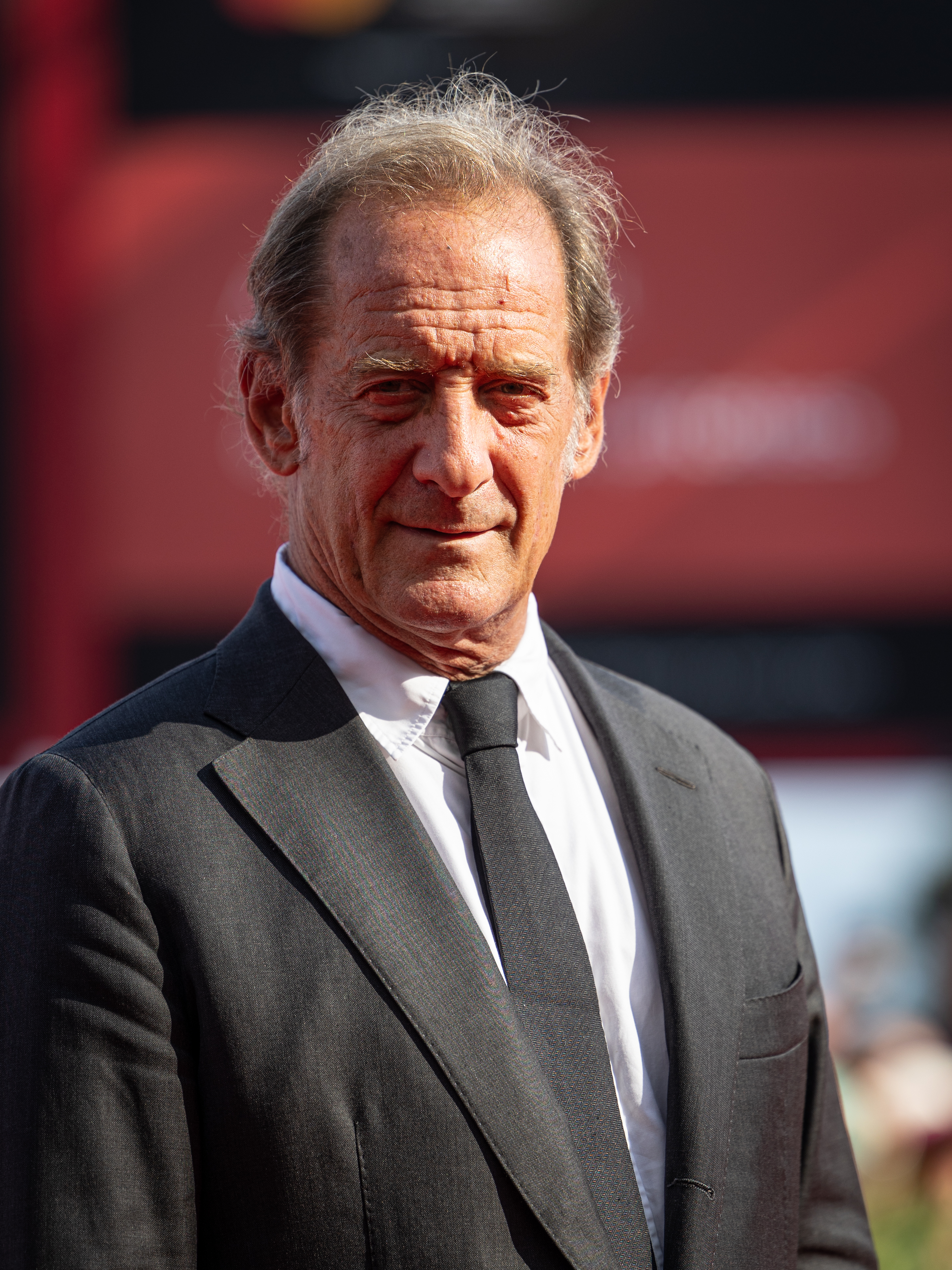
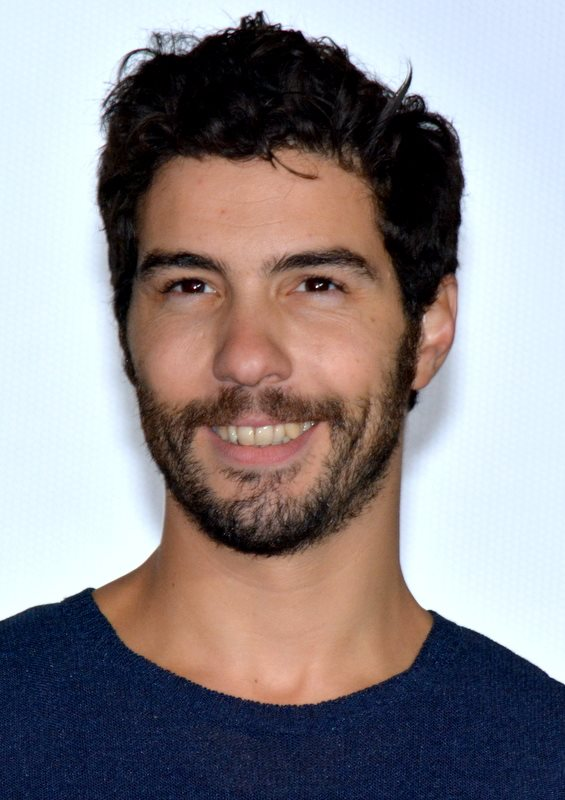
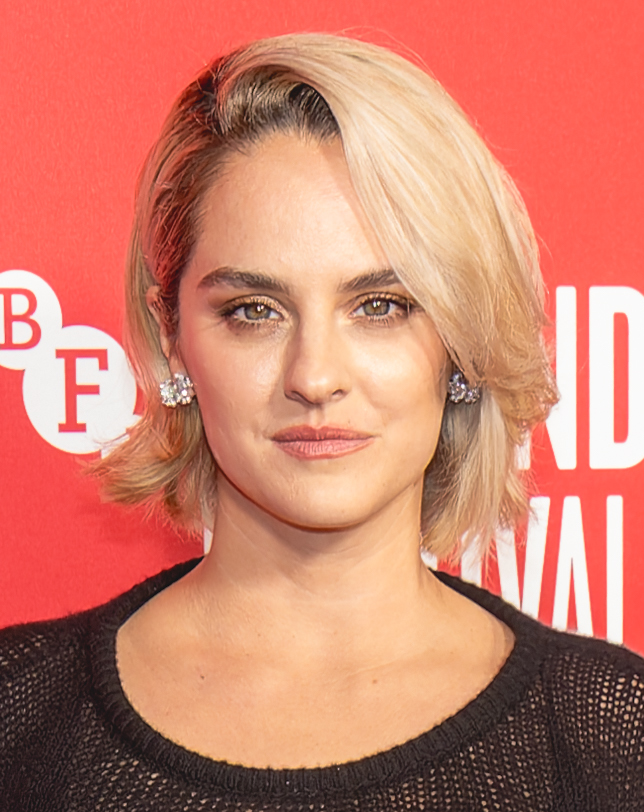
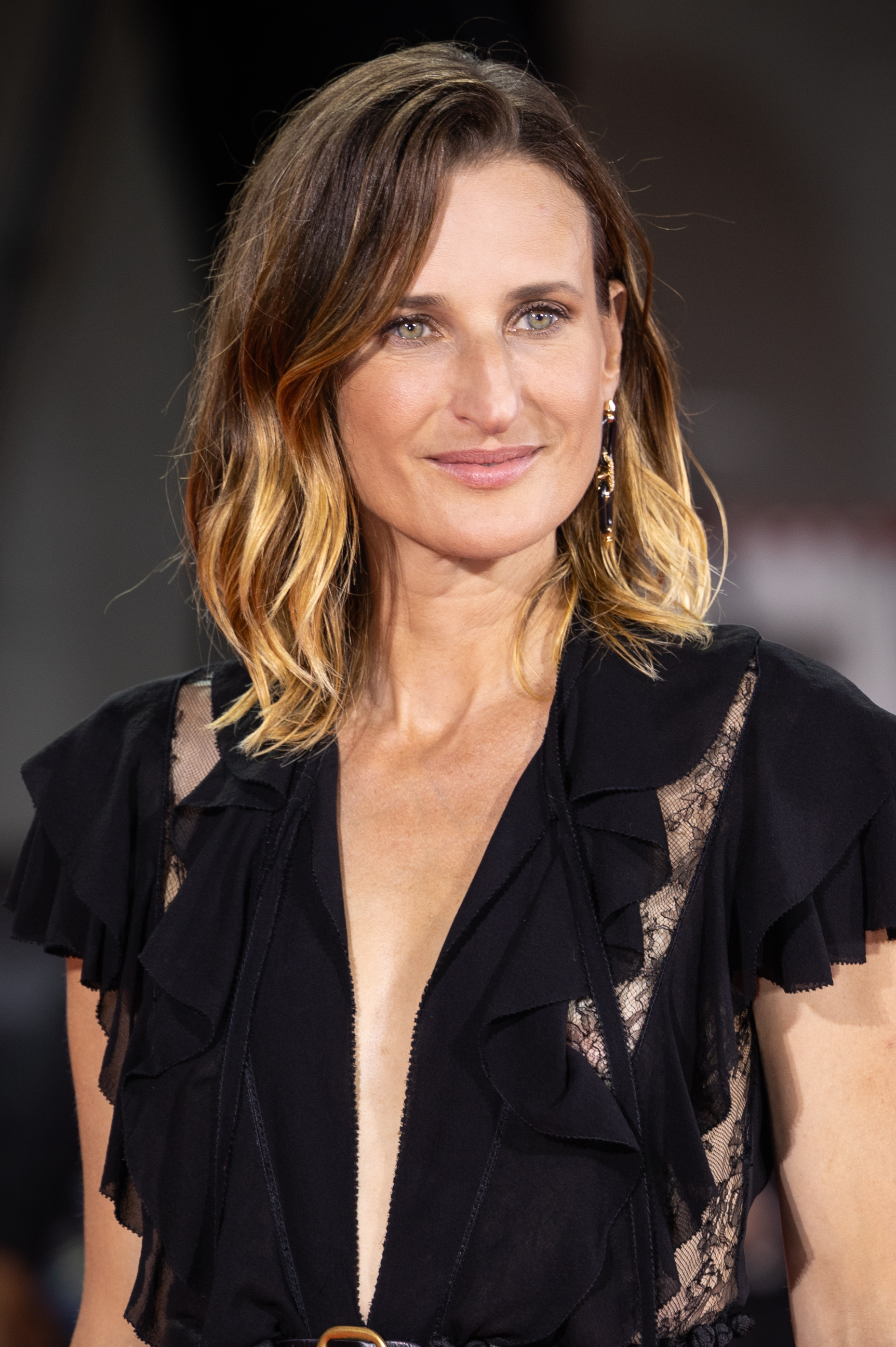
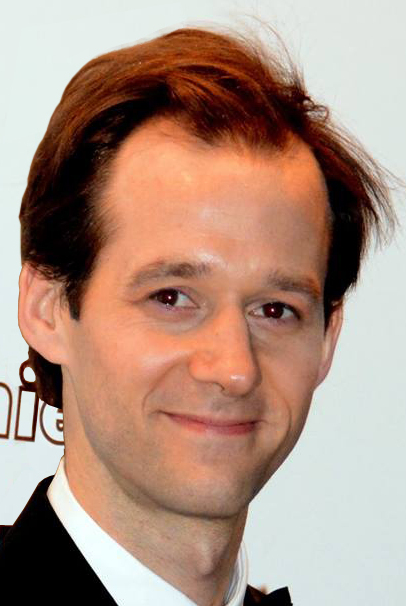
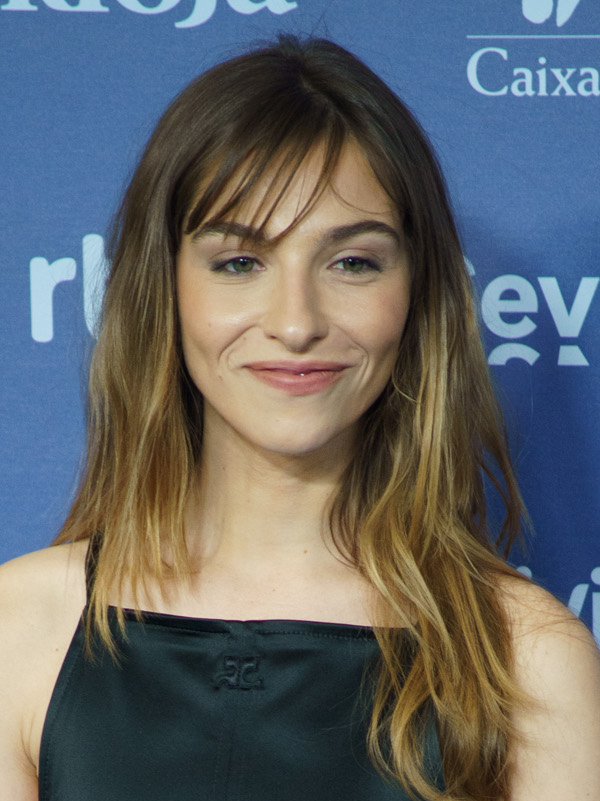
The ensemble cast of Les Misérables:
(First row from L to R): Vincent Lindon, Tahar Rahim, Noémie Merlant
(Second row from L to R): Camille Cottin, Benjamin Lavernhe, Marie Colomb
- Vincent Lindon as Jean Valjean
- Tahar Rahim as Javert
- Noémie Merlant as Fantine
- Camille Cottin as Madame Thénardier
- Benjamin Lavernhe as Monsieur Thénardier
- Marie Colomb as Éponine 25 years
- Megan Northam as Cosette 25 years
- Giorgia Sinicorni as the mother of Fantine
- Philippe Arnaud
- Frans Boyer
- Vincent Colombe as the park ranger
- Frédéric Pierrot as Monseigneur Bienvenu Myriel
- Vassili Schneider as Marius
- Léonard Signoret as Gavroche
- Ninon Veys as infant Éponine
- Lauren Luczak-Kahlert as infant Fantine

== Production ==
=== Development ===
The project was announced in January 2024. An adaptation of Victor Hugo's classic Les Misérables, which would be directed by Fred Cavayé. On 18 July 2025, StudioCanal revealed the details of the film.

=== Casting ===
In February 2024, Vincent Lindon was selected to play Jean Valjean in the film adaptation. In April 2025, the additional cast members joined the production: Benjamin Lavernhe as Thénardier, Camille Cottin as his wife, Tahar Rahim as Inspector Javert, Noémie Merlant as Fantine, Megan Northam as Cosette, and Vassili Schneider as Marius, along with Marie Colomb and Sayyid El Alami in supporting roles.

=== Filming ===
Principal photography began on 21 July 2025 for 17 weeks in Paris and Bordeaux. The locations of filming were Saint-Macaire in Gironde department, Cour Mably in Bordeaux and Place du Châtelet a public square in Paris.

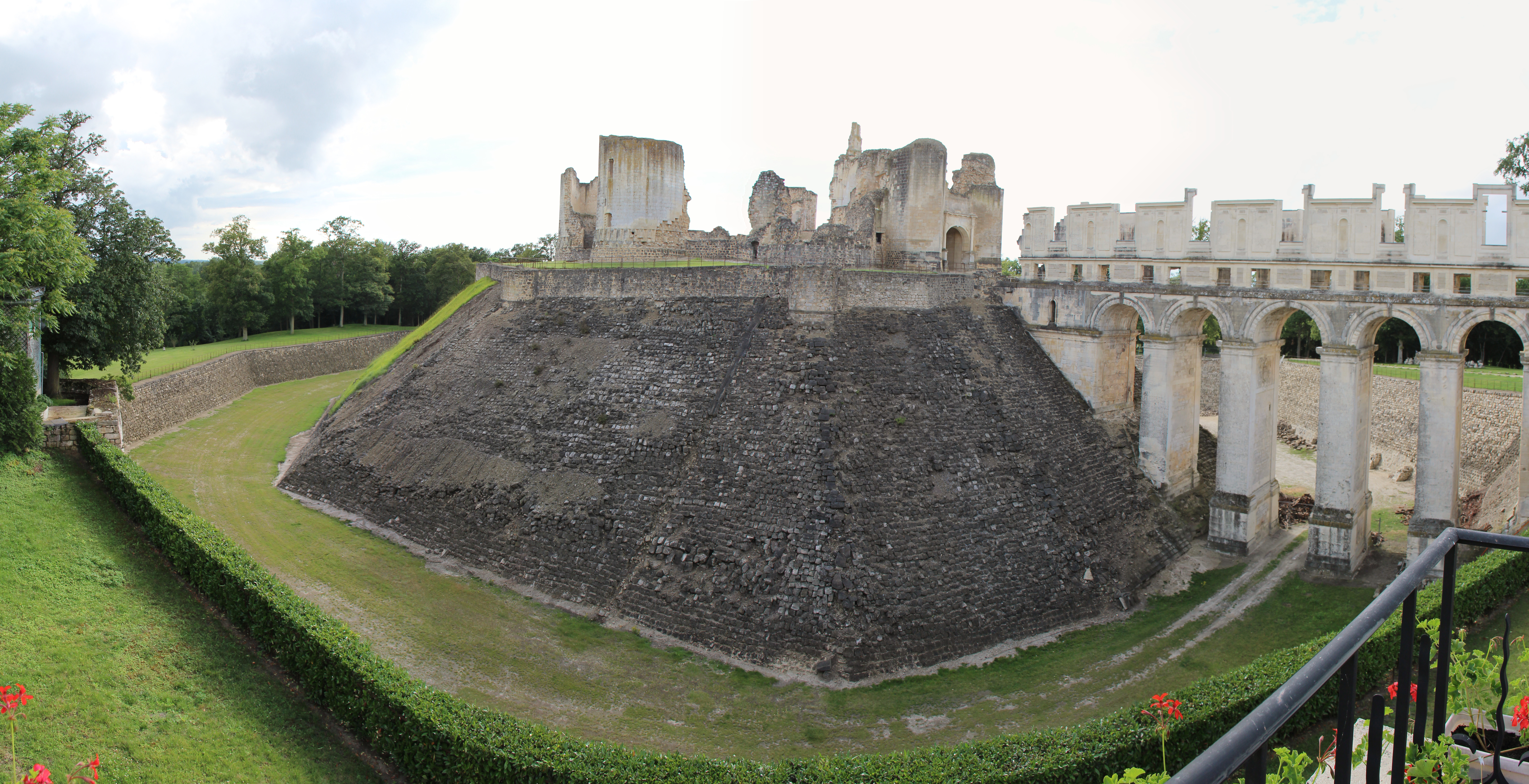
Château de Fère-en-Tardenois, film location

In August 2025, the film unit shot at the Château de Fère-en-Tardenois, a ruined castle in the commune of Fère-en-Tardenois in the Aisne département.

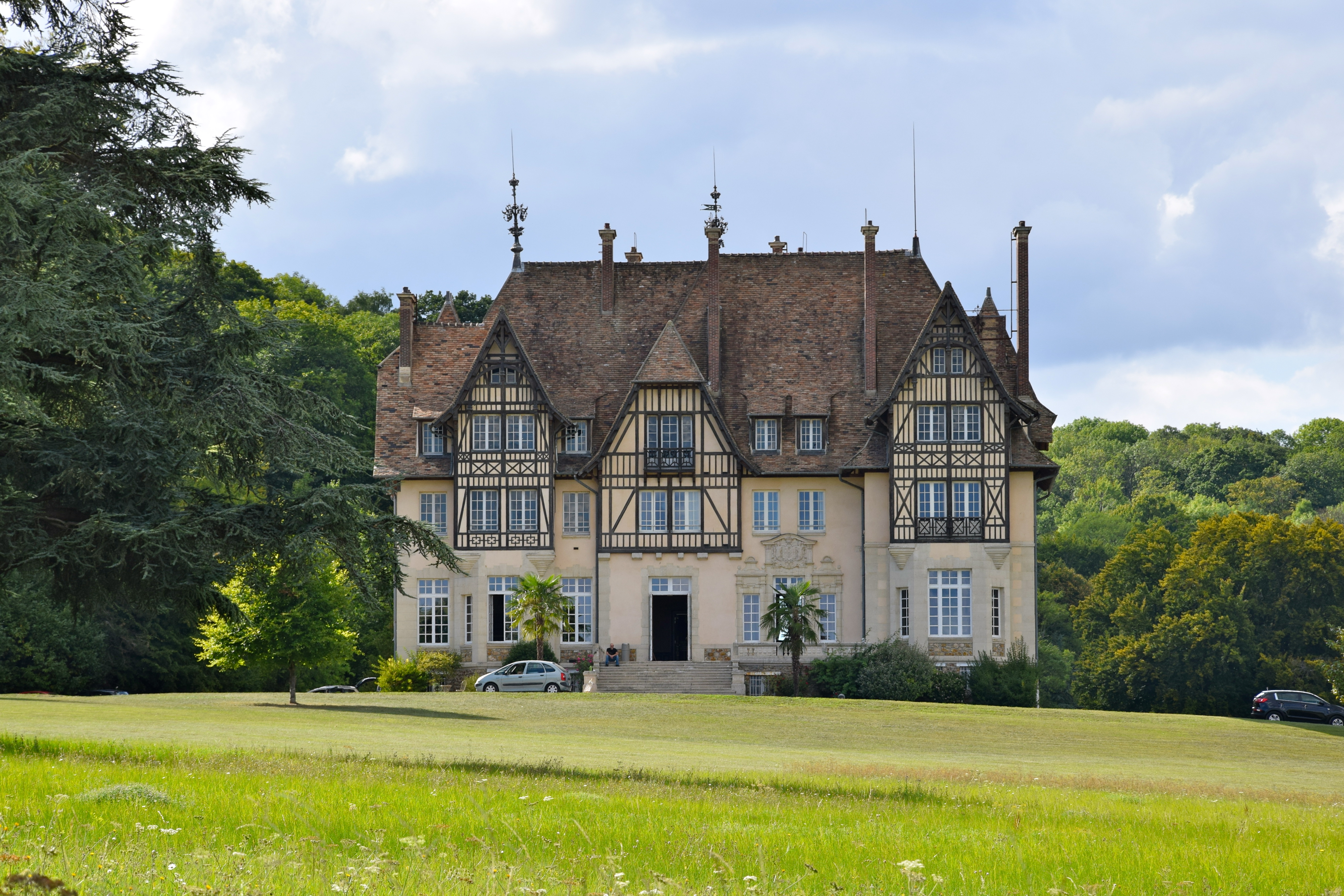
Château de Chambly (Oise), film location

In September 2025, the film was shot in Compiègne in Oise region, Senlis in Hauts-de-France and the historic château, Château de Chambly, on rue d'Amblaincourt located in the commune of Chambly.

In October 2025, the unit moved to Northern France in Le Vésinet in Yvelines at the Parc Princesse cemetery.

In January 2026, it was reported that film was also shot at the Bry-sur-Marne Studios located in Val-de-Marne, Île-de-France. TSF Studios 77 in Seine-et-Marne served as an indoor production facility for Paris street sets scenes requiring controlled environmental conditions.

== Release ==
Les Misérables had its world premiere at the 74th San Sebastián International Film Festival on 18 September 2026, vying for the Golden Shell. It was also screened in TIFF's Market under Market Screening programme at the 2026 Toronto International Film Festival on 10 September 2026.

It will be screened in Gala Premieres section of the Zurich Film Festival on 2 October 2026.

Initially in June 2025, it was announced that the film will release in French theatres on 11 November 2026, but in January 2026, it was pushed back to 14 October 2026.

In July 2026, first images and teaser was revealed by StudioCanal confirming the 14 October release date.

== Reception ==
Fabien Lemercier of Cineuropa deemed the film to be "a big, crowd-pleasing, family-oriented spectacle that's fairly entertaining and a rather odd choice for the competitive showcase of an international festival".

Enric Albero of El Cultural determined the film to be a "quality blockbuster", loyal both to the source material and to the principles of academicism, adding up that, fortunately, nobody sings in this adaptation.

== Accolades ==
Award	Date of ceremony	Category	Recipient(s)	Result	Ref.
San Sebastián International Film Festival	26 September 2026	Golden Shell for Best Film	Les Misérables	Pending	

== See also ==
- Adaptations of Les Misérables
