= Joachim, 4th Prince Murat =

French general and noble (1834–1901)

Joachim Murat
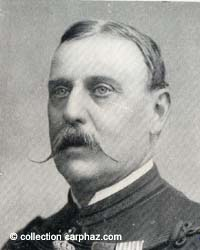

Prince Murat
- Tenure: 10 April 1878 – 23 October 1901
- Predecessor: Prince Lucien
- Successor: Prince Joachim
- Born: 21 July 1834; Bordentown, New Jersey, U.S.
- Died: 23 October 1901 (aged 67); Chambly, Oise, France
- Spouse: Malcy Louise Caroline Berthier de Wagram (m. 1854; died 1884) Lydia Hainguerlot, Baroness Hainguerlot (née Hervey) (m. 1894; died 1901)
- Issue: 3, including Joachim, 5th Prince Murat
- Father: Lucien, 3rd Prince Murat
- Mother: Caroline Georgina Fraser

Joachim Joseph Napoléon Murat, 4th Prince Murat (21 July 1834 – 23 October 1901) was a major-general in the French Army and a member of the Bonaparte-Murat family.

== Early life ==
Joachim Joseph was born at Bordentown, New Jersey, on 21 June 1834. He was the eldest son, of four siblings, born to the former Caroline Georgina Fraser (1810–1879) and Prince Napoléon Lucien Charles Murat, 2nd Prince of Pontecorvo and 3rd Prince Murat.

His father was the second son of Joachim Murat, King of Naples, who married Napoleon's sister, Caroline Bonaparte. His maternal grandparents were Thomas Fraser, a Scottish emigrant to the United States and major in the Loyalist militia during the American Revolution, and his wife Ann Loughton (née Smith) Fraser.

== Career ==
He moved to France with his family in 1848, after the fall of Louis-Philippe of France, where his father was appointed Minister, senator and imperial prince.

In 1852 Joachim entered the army, becoming an officer the following year and rising to the rank of lieutenant colonel in 1863. In 1866 he became a colonel of a regiment of the Cavalry Guard.

In 1870 he was made brigadier general and participated in the Franco-Prussian War that led to the end of the Second Empire.

After the fall of Napoleon III he retired to a private life but was able to maintain the title of general and prince.

== Personal life ==
In 1854, he married in Paris Malcy Louise Caroline Berthier de Wagram (1832–1884), at the Tuileries Palace. She was a daughter of Napoléon Berthier de Wagram, 2nd Duc de Wagram, and the former Zénaïde Françoise Clary. His wife's paternal grandfather was Marshal Berthier and she was a grand-niece of Désirée Clary and Julie Clary. Together, they were the parents of three surviving children, two daughters and one son:

- Princess Eugénie Louise Caroline Zenaide Murat (1855–1934), who married Giuseppe Caracciolo, 9th Prince of Torella (1839–1910), in Paris in June 1887.
- Joachim, 5th Prince Murat (1856–1932), who married Marie Cécile Ney d'Elchingen, a daughter of the Prince de la Moskowa and a great-granddaughter of Marshal Michel Ney, in 1884.
- Princess Anna Napoléona Karolina Alexandrine Murat (1863–1940), who married Count Agenor Maria Gołuchowski, the Minister of Foreign Affairs of Austria-Hungary.

As a widower (since 1884), he married secondly the Baroness Hainguerlot, née Lydia Hervey (1841–1901), in Paris on 7 November 1894. Lydia was born in Kemptown, Sussex, and was the daughter of Charles John Vigors Hervey, Esq. and Martha Hervey (née Kemp). She was the widow of Arthur, Baron Hainguerlot (1833–1892), a wealthy Parisian banker. Joachim and his second wife did not have any children together.

He spent the rest of his life at his family's castle, the Château de Chambly in Chambly, Oise, France where his second wife died on 25 September 1901. Prince Murat there died a month later on 23 October 1901.

== Awards ==
- 1860: Grand Cross of the Zähringer Lion
- 26 January 1861: Knight of the Red Eagle, 1st Class
- 1867: Grand Cross of the Imperial Order of Leopold

== Ancestry ==
Ancestors of Joachim, 4th Prince Murat

16. Guillaume Murat
8. Pierre Murat-Jordy
17. Marguerite Herbeil
4. Joachim Murat, King of Naples
18. Pierre Loubières
9. Jeanne Loubières
19. Jeanne Viellescazes
2. Prince Napoleon Lucien Charles Murat
20. Giuseppe Maria Buonaparte
10. Carlo Buonaparte
21. Maria Saveria Paravicini
5. Caroline Bonaparte
22. Giovanni Geronimo Ramolino
11. Letizia Ramolino
23. Angela Maria Pietrasanta
1. Joachim, 4th Prince Murat
12. David Fraser
6. Thomas Fraser
3. Georgina Fraser
28. Benjamin Smith
14. Thomas Loughton Smith
29. Ann Loughton
7. Ann Loughton Smith
15. Elizabeth Inglis

French nobility of the First French Empire
| Preceded by Lucien Murat | Prince of Pontecorvo; 1847–1878 | Succeeded by Joachim Napoléon Murat |
| Preceded by Lucien Murat | Prince Murat; 1878–1901 | Succeeded by Joachim Napoléon Murat |
