= Joachim, 5th Prince Murat =

Joachim Murat
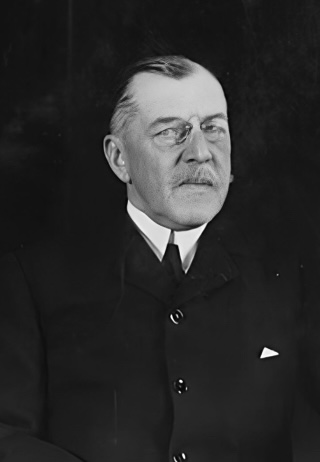
- Murat in 1918

Prince Murat
- Tenure: 23 October 1901 – 2 November 1932
- Predecessor: Joachim Joseph Murat
- Successor: Joachim Murat
- Born: 28 February 1856; Boissy-Saint-Léger, Val-de-Marne, France
- Died: 2 November 1932 (aged 76); Château de Chambly, Chambly, Oise, France
- Spouse: Marie Cécile Ney d'Elchingen (m. 1884)
- Issue: 8, including Joachim, 6th Prince Murat
- Father: Joachim, 4th Prince Murat
- Mother: Malcy Louise Caroline Berthier de Wagram

Joachim Napoléon Murat, 5th Prince Murat (28 February 1856 – 2 November 1932) was a member of the Bonaparte-Murat family.

== Early life ==
Joachim Napoléon Murat was born on 28 February 1856 at Boissy-Saint-Léger, Val-de-Marne, France. His parents were Joachim Joseph Murat, 4th Prince Murat and of Malcy Louise Caroline Berthier de Wagram. His paternal grandparents were Prince Napoleon Lucien Charles Murat, 2nd Prince of Pontecorvo and 3rd Prince Murat, the second son of Joachim Murat, King of Naples, who married Napoleon's sister, Caroline Bonaparte, and Caroline Georgina Fraser (Charleston, South Carolina, 13 April 1810 – Paris, 10 February 1879), daughter of Thomas Fraser.

His maternal grandparents were Napoléon-Alexandre Berthier, 2nd Prince of Wagram (1810–1887) and Zénaïde Françoise Clary (1812–1884), who was the niece of Désirée Clary and Julie Clary. His maternal great-grandfather was Louis-Alexandre Berthier (1753–1815), 1st prince de Wagram, 1st duc de Valangin, 1st sovereign Prince of Neuchâtel, who was a Marshal and Vice-Constable of France beginning in 1808, and Chief of Staff (Major général) under Napoleon.

== Career ==
In 1919, Prince Murat gave his Paris house on the rue de Monceau to President Woodrow Wilson for his use while in Paris for the Paris Peace Conference.

== Personal life ==
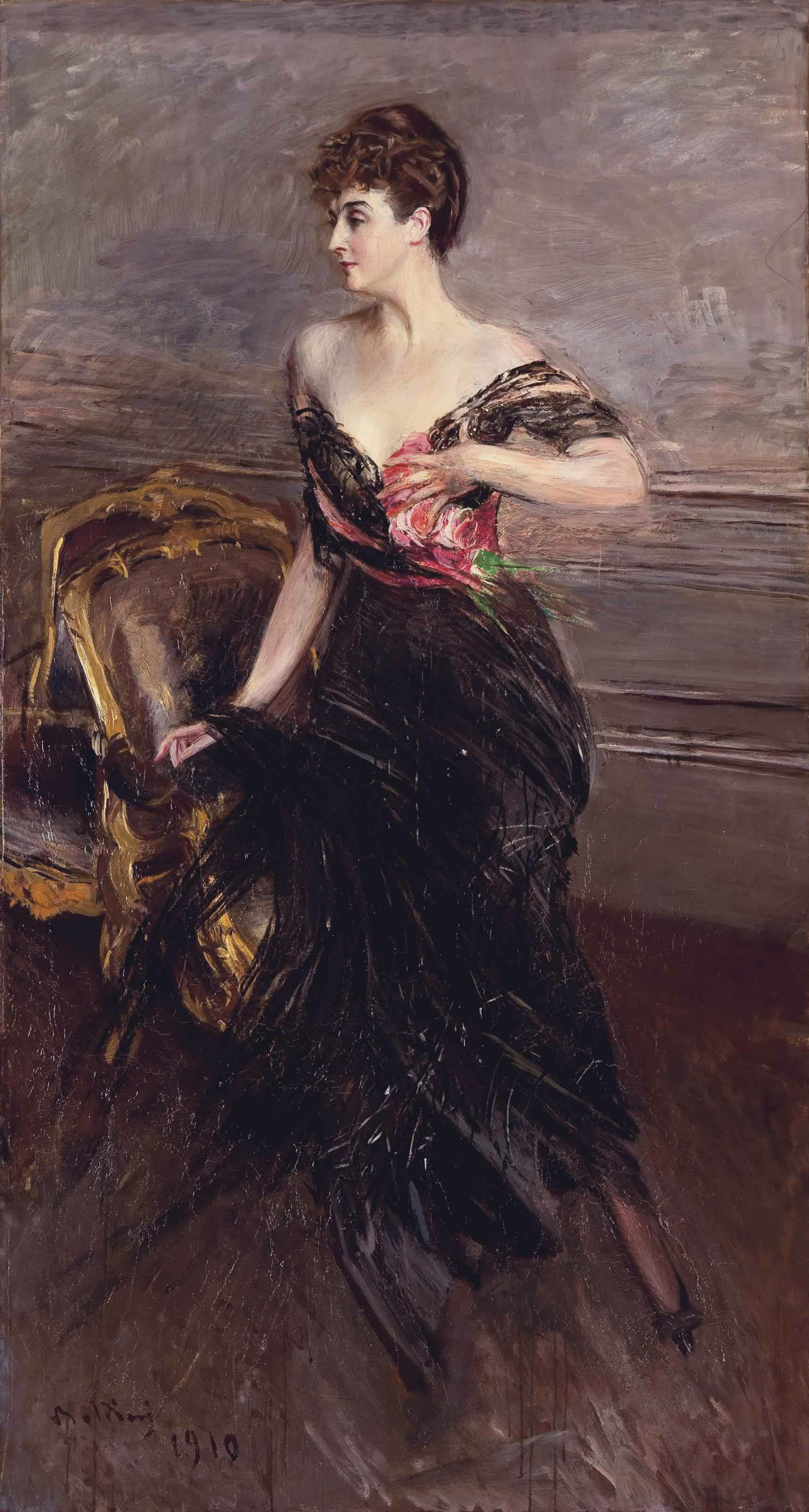
Cécile Murat Ney d'Elchingen (1867-1960) (Giovanni Boldini, 1910)

On 10 May 1884 he married Marie Cécile Ney d'Elchingen, a daughter of the Michel Aloys Ney, 3rd Duc d'Elchingen and a great-granddaughter of Marshal Michel Ney. Together, they were the parents of eight children, including:

1. Joachim, 6th Prince Murat (1885–1938), who married Louise Amélie Plantié. Their son, Joachim, 7th Prince Murat was shot in 1944 while fighting for the French Resistance.
2. Princess Marguerite Murat (1886–1956), who married Baron Edgar Lejeune
3. Prince Pierre Murat (1887–1888), who died in infancy.
4. Prince Alexandre Murat (1889–1926) who married Yvonne Gillois
5. Prince Charles Michael Joachim Napoleon Murat (1892–1973), who married Margaret Stuyvesant Rutherfurd (1891–1976), the step-daughter of William Kissam Vanderbilt and the granddaughter of Lewis Morris Rutherfurd (1816–1892) and Oliver Harriman (1829–1904), in 1929. She was previously married to U.S. Representative Ogden Livingston Mills (1884–1937) and Sir Paul Henry Dukes (1889–1967).
6. Prince Paul Murat (1893–1964), who married Solange de La Rochefoucald
7. Prince Louis Murat (1896–1916), who was killed in action during World War I.
8. Prince Jérôme Murat (1898–1992).

Prince Louis died unmarried and Prince Charles had no issue; all the others did. Prince Murat died at the family estate, Château de Chambly in Oise on 2 November 1932.

== Ancestry ==
Ancestors of Joachim, 5th Prince Murat

16. Pierre Murat-Jordy
8. Joachim Murat, King of Naples
17. Jeanne Loubières
4. Prince Napoleon Lucien Charles Murat
18. Carlo Buonaparte
9. Caroline Bonaparte
19. Letizia Ramolino
2. Joachim, 4th Prince Murat
20. David Fraser
10. Thomas Fraser
5. Georgina Fraser
22. Thomas Loughton Smith
11. Anne Loughton Smith
23. Elizabeth Inglis
1. Joachim, 5th Prince Murat
24. Jean-Baptiste Berthier
12. Louis-Alexandre Berthier
25. Marie Françoise L'Huillier de La Serre
6. Napoléon Alexandre Berthier
26. Duke Wilhelm in Bavaria
13. Duchess Maria Elisabeth in Bavaria
27. Countess Palatine Maria Anna of Zweibrücken-Birkenfeld
3. Princess Malcy Louise Caroline Berthier de Wagram
28. François Clary
14. Count Nicolas Clary
29. Françoise Rose Somis
7. Countess Zénaide Françoise Clary
30. Marie François Rouyer
15. Anne Rouyeur
31. Sophie Thérèse Claudine Grand

French nobility of the First French Empire
Preceded by Joachim Joseph Murat	Prince of Pontecorvo; 1878–1901	Succeeded by Joachim Murat
Preceded by Joachim Joseph Murat	Prince Murat; 1901–1932	Succeeded by Joachim Murat
