= Prince Murat =

French princely title

House of Murat
- Parent house: Bonaparte (female line)
- Country: France, Italy
- Founded: 1 August 1808; 218 years ago
- Founder: Joachim-Napoleon
- Current head: Joachim, 8th Prince Murat
- Final ruler: Joachim-Napoleon
- Historic seat: Château de Chambly
- Titles: King of Naples; Grand Duke of Berg and Cleves; Prince of Pontecorvo
- Styles: "His/Her Majesty" (Joachim Murat and Caroline Bonaparte) "His/Her Royal Highness" (head of the House and his wife) "His/Her Highness" (members of the House)
- Deposition: 2 May 1815

Prince Murat ([pʁɛ̃s myʁa]) is a French princely title that traces its origin back to 1804, when Emperor Napoleon granted the rank of prince français to his brother-in-law Joachim Murat, who subsequently reigned as King of Naples from 1808 to 1815. On 5 December 1812, Joachim Murat's second son Lucien was created sovereign Prince of Pontecorvo (an enclave in the Kingdom of Naples) in succession to Jean-Baptiste Jules Bernadotte, by an Imperial Decree.

The Prince of Pontecorvo is a courtesy title, unrecognised in Italian law, but still used for the heir apparent of the head of the family. The Murat family is known collectively as the House of Murat (French: Maison Murat; Neapolitan: Casà ’e Murat).

On March 25, 2017, the anniversary of the birth of their founder, the family revived the old Royal Order of the Two Sicilies as a dynastic family order.

== Heads of the family ==
| Image | Name | Birth date | Death date | Tenure start | Tenure end |
|---|---|---|---|---|---|
| | Joachim, 1st Prince Murat Also King of Naples (1808–1815) as Joachim-Napoleon | 25 March 1767 | 13 October 1815 (aged 48) | 1805 | 13 October 1815 (10 years, 285 days) |
| | Achille, 2nd Prince Murat | 21 January 1801 | 15 April 1847 (aged 46) | 13 October 1815 | 15 April 1847 (31 years, 184 days) |
| | Lucien, 3rd Prince Murat | 16 May 1803 | 10 April 1878 (aged 74) | 15 April 1847 | 10 April 1878 (30 years, 360 days) |
| | Joachim, 4th Prince Murat | 21 June 1834 | 23 October 1901 (aged 67) | 10 April 1878 | 23 October 1901 (23 years, 196 days) |
| | Joachim, 5th Prince Murat | 28 February 1856 | 2 November 1932 (aged 76) | 23 October 1901 | 2 November 1932 (31 years, 10 days) |
| | Joachim, 6th Prince Murat | 6 August 1885 | 11 May 1938 (aged 52) | 2 November 1932 | 11 May 1938 (5 years, 190 days) |
| | Joachim, 7th Prince Murat | 16 January 1920 | 20 July 1944 (aged 24) | 11 May 1938 | 20 July 1944 (6 years, 70 days) |
| | Joachim, 8th Prince Murat | 26 November 1944 | | 26 November 1944 | Incumbent (81 years, 347 days) |

The heir apparent is the current head of the family's only son, Joachim, Prince of Pontecorvo (born 3 May 1973).
