= Lucien, 3rd Prince Murat =

Lucien Murat
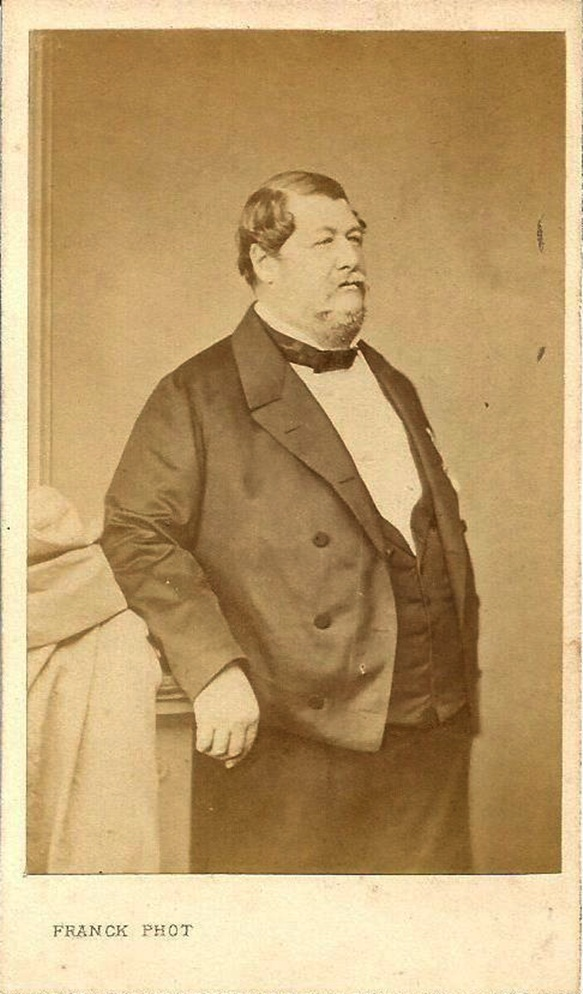

Prince of Pontecorvo
- Reign: 5 December 1812 – 25 May 1815
- Predecessor: Jean Baptiste Jules Bernadotte
- Successor: Principality abolished

Prince Murat
- Tenure: 15 April 1847 – 10 April 1878
- Predecessor: Prince Achille
- Successor: Prince Joachim
- Born: Lucien Charles Joseph Napoléon Murat; 16 May 1803; Milan, Italian Republic
- Died: 10 April 1878 (aged 74); Paris, France
- Spouse: Caroline Georgina Fraser (m. 1831)
- Issue: Caroline, Baroness de Chassiron; Joachim, 4th Prince Murat; Anne, Duchess of Mouchy; Prince Achille Murat; Prince Louis Murat
- Father: Joachim Murat
- Mother: Caroline Bonaparte

Lucien Charles Joseph Napoléon, Prince Français, Prince of Naples, 2nd Prince de Pontecorvo, 3rd Prince Murat (16 May 1803 – 10 April 1878) was a French politician, and the sovereign Prince of Pontecorvo between 1812 and May 1815.

== Early life ==
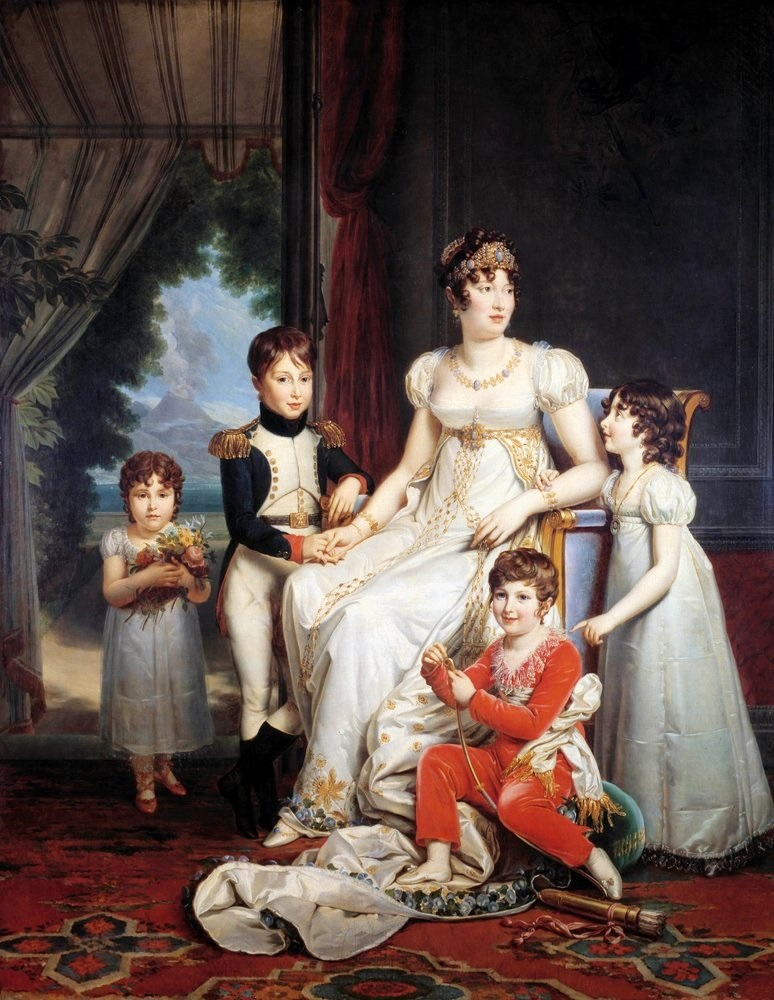
Lucien (in red) with his brother, sisters, and mother Caroline Bonaparte, c. 1809-10.

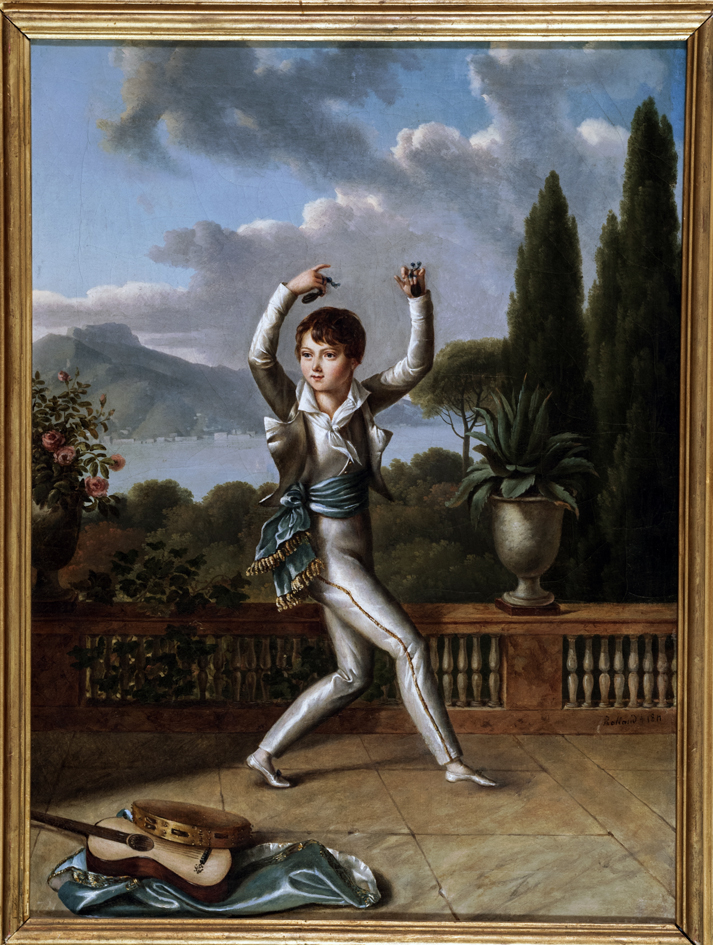
Lucien Murat, Prince of Naples, 1811

Lucien Charles Joseph Napoléon was born on 16 May 1803 in Milan. He was the second son of four children of Joachim Murat, the 1st Prince Murat, Grand Duke of Berg and King of Naples, and his Queen consort Caroline Bonaparte. His siblings included Achille, 2nd Prince Murat (who married the American widow, Catherine Daingerfield Willis, a great-grandniece of President George Washington), Princess Marie Letizia Murat (who married Guido Taddeo Pepoli, Marchese Pepoli, Conte di Castiglione), and Princess Louise Julie Murat (who married Giulio Conte Rasponi).

His maternal grandparents were Carlo Buonaparte and Letizia Ramolino and his maternal uncles included Joseph Bonaparte, Napoleon I of France, Lucien Bonaparte, Louis Bonaparte and Jérôme Bonaparte. His maternal aunts included Elisa Bonaparte and Pauline Bonaparte. His paternal grandparents were Pierre Murat-Jordy, an affluent innkeeper and postmaster, and the former Jeanne Loubières.

== Life in exile ==
Murat had to flee the Italian Peninsula after his father's execution, which had been ordered by Ferdinand IV of Naples. Between 1815 and 1822 he and his older brother Prince Achille Murat received a solid education at Schloss Frohsdorf in the Austrian Empire. He later went to Venice, where he was pursued by the Austrian authorities, necessitating his departure to the United States where his elder brother Prince Achille Murat had already moved (becoming a naturalized citizen sometime after July 1828 and dropping his European titles).

En route to America, he was shipwrecked in Spain and captured by the Spanish, compelling him to remain there for many months until his brother secured assistance from the American President James Monroe for his release. He finally arrived in the United States in April 1825. He traveled to Philadelphia to meet his maternal uncle Joseph (the former King of Spain) and from there traveled extensively in the western part of the country, as well as Texas and California. While in the U.S., he married an American and had several children. After several years of financial difficulty, he opened a girls' boarding school with his wife.

On his many travels to France, Murat sought in 1838 and 1844 the possibility to reclaim his family's right to the throne, which his elder brother had abandoned. In France he was always only allowed to stay 5 weeks at a time.

=== Settlement in France ===
He continued to live in the United States, staying in daily correspondence with his backers, until the fall of Louis-Philippe of France in 1848. He returned to France with his wife and son and was elected a member of the constituent assembly in the 1848 French Constituent Assembly election. In 1849, he was appointed as Minister to Turin. In 1852, he received the status of senator and the title of prince.

Meanwhile, the dignitaries of the Grand Orient de France, Saint-Albin Berville and Marie-Auguste Desanlis saw no other means to save obedience after the coup d'état of 2 December 1851, than to offer the title of Grand Master to Prince Murat who accepted it. He had the constitution of 1854 passed, which gave the Grand Master, elected for seven years, great powers. He created the Civil Society for the construction of French Masonry (1853–1854) and purchased the building at 16, rue Cadet, which became the Hôtel du Grand Orient de France.

In 1861, he tried to regain the throne of Naples, and composed a manifesto to support his claim and was referred to by The New York Times as "the fat pretender to the throne of Naples". This was not well received by his maternal first cousin Napoleon III and Murat abandoned hopes of regaining the crown.

During the Franco-Prussian War, after the French defeat at the Siege of Metz in 1870, Murat was imprisoned with Marshal of France François Achille Bazaine. After the fall of the Second French Empire, Murat moved back to United States for a short time where he resumed his business interests, including grist mills and saw mills near Evans Mills, Jefferson County, New York.

== Personal life ==
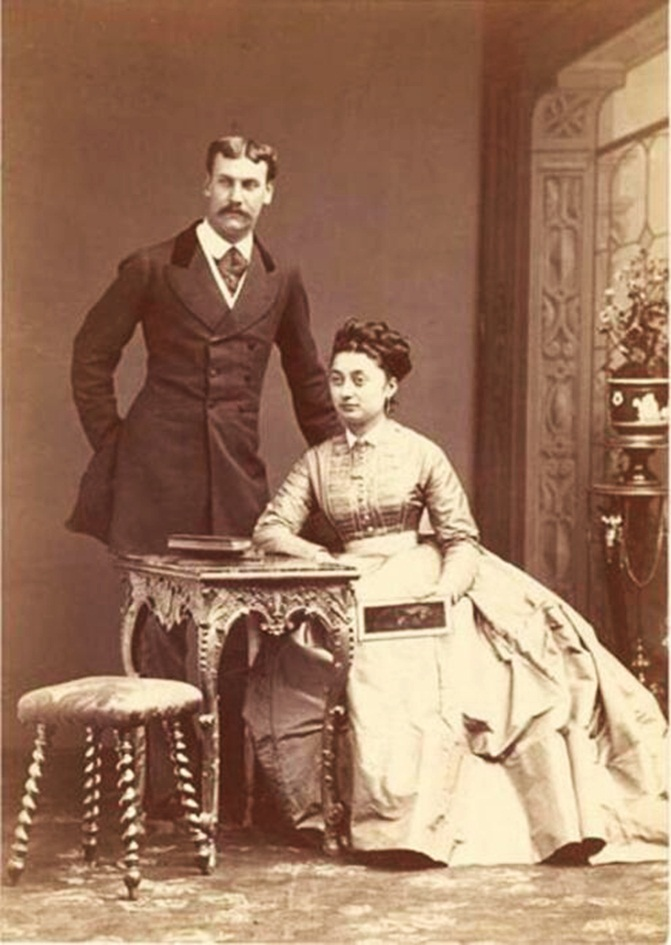
His second son, Prince Achille Murat (1847–95), with his wife, Princess Salome Dadiani.

On 18 August 1831, Murat married Caroline Georgina Fraser (1810–1879) in Bordentown, New Jersey. Caroline, a Protestant, former governess at the residence of Joseph Bonaparte in Bordentown, New Jersey, was born in Charleston, South Carolina, daughter of Thomas Fraser, a Scottish emigrant to the United States and major in the Loyalist militia during the American Revolution, and Ann Loughton (née Smith) Fraser. Together, they lived in Bordentown for several years, and were the parents of:

- Princess Caroline Laetitia Murat (31 December 1832 – 23 July 1902), who married Charles, Baron de Chassiron in Paris in 1850. After his death in 1871, she married John Lewis Garden (1833–1892) of Redisham Hall in London in 1871.
- Joachim Joseph Napoléon Murat, 4th Prince Murat, 3rd Prince of Pontecorvo (21 July 1834 – 23 October 1901), a Major-General of the French Army who married Malcy Louise Caroline Berthier de Wagram (1832–1884), daughter of Napoléon Alexandre Berthier, 2nd Prince of Wagram (1810–1887), at the Tuileries Palace in 1854. After her death in 1884, he married Lady Lydia Hervey (1841–1901) in Paris in 1894.
- Princess Anne Murat (3 February 1841 – 7 September 1924), who married Antoine, 6th Duc de Mouchy, 6th Prince-Duc de Poix (1841–1909) in Paris in 1865.
- Prince Charles Louis Napoléon Achille Murat (2 January 1847 – February 1895), who married Princess Salomé Dadiani of Mingrelia (1848–1913) in Paris in 1868.
- Prince Louis Napoléon Murat (22 December 1851 – 22 September 1912), who married Eudoxia Mikhailovna Somova (1850–1924), a relative of Orest Somov, in Odessa in 1873. She was the widow of Prince Orbeliani.

Lucien died on 10 April 1878 in Paris. His wife died shortly after him on 10 February 1879 in their Paris apartment, 80 Boulevard Malesherbes, 8th arrondissement.

=== Descendants ===
Through his son Joachim, he was the grandfather of Joachim, 5th Prince Murat, a celebrated sportsman and race horse owner who married Marie Cécile Ney d'Elchingen, daughter of the Prince de la Moskowa and the great-granddaughter of the Marshal Michel Ney. In 1919, Prince Murat gave his Paris house on the rue de Monceau to President Woodrow Wilson for his use while in Paris for the Paris Peace Conference. He died at the family estate, Château de Chambly in Oise.

Through his daughter Princess Anne, he is the direct ancestor of Archduke Carl Christian of Austria (b. 1954) and Michel, 14th Prince of Ligne (b. 1951).

Through his son Prince Achille Murat, he had three grandchildren. The eldest was Lucien-Charles-David-Napoléon Murat, Prince Murat (1870–1933), who married Marie Augustine de Rohan-Chabot, daughter of Alain de Rohan-Chabot, 11th Duke of Rohan, and Herminie de La Brousse de Verteillac. Her older sister, Marie-Joséphine de Rohan-Chabot, was the wife of Louis de Talleyrand-Périgord (grandson of Louis de Talleyrand-Périgord and nephew of Boson de Talleyrand-Périgord). After Prince Murat's death in 1933, his widow married French writer and diplomat Count Charles de Chambrun. The remaining grandchildren were Prince Louis Napoléon Achille Charles (1878–1943), major general in the Russian Army, and Princess Antoinette Katherine (1879–1954), who married Gabrielle Johan Carlo Giuseppe Luigi Maria Nino Bortolotto Bebe.

Through his youngest son, Prince Louis, he was the grandfather of two boys, the elder being Prince Eugéne Michel Napoléon Murat (1875–1906), who married the daughter of the Duke of Elchingen, with whom he had three children. Prince Eugéne died in an automobile accident while on his way to Karlsbad. The younger was Prince Michel Anne Charles Joachim Napoléon Murat (1887–1941), who married Helena MacDonald Stallo, heiress to part of the Standard Oil fortune, in 1913. Through his grandson Prince Michel, he was the great-grandfather of Princess Laure Louise Napoléone Eugénie Caroline Murat, who married Swiss-American journalist Fernand Auberjonois, the parents of his great-great-grandson, actor René Auberjonois (1 June 1940 – 8 December 2019).

Regnal titles
Vacant Title last held by Jean Baptiste Jules Bernadotte	Prince of Pontecorvo; 1812–1815	Principality abolished
French nobility of the First French Empire
New creation	Prince of Pontecorvo; As title of pretence 1815–1847	Succeeded by Joachim Murat
Preceded by Achille Murat	Prince Murat; 1847–1878	Succeeded by Joachim Murat
