= Chambly, Oise =

Chambly
- Commune
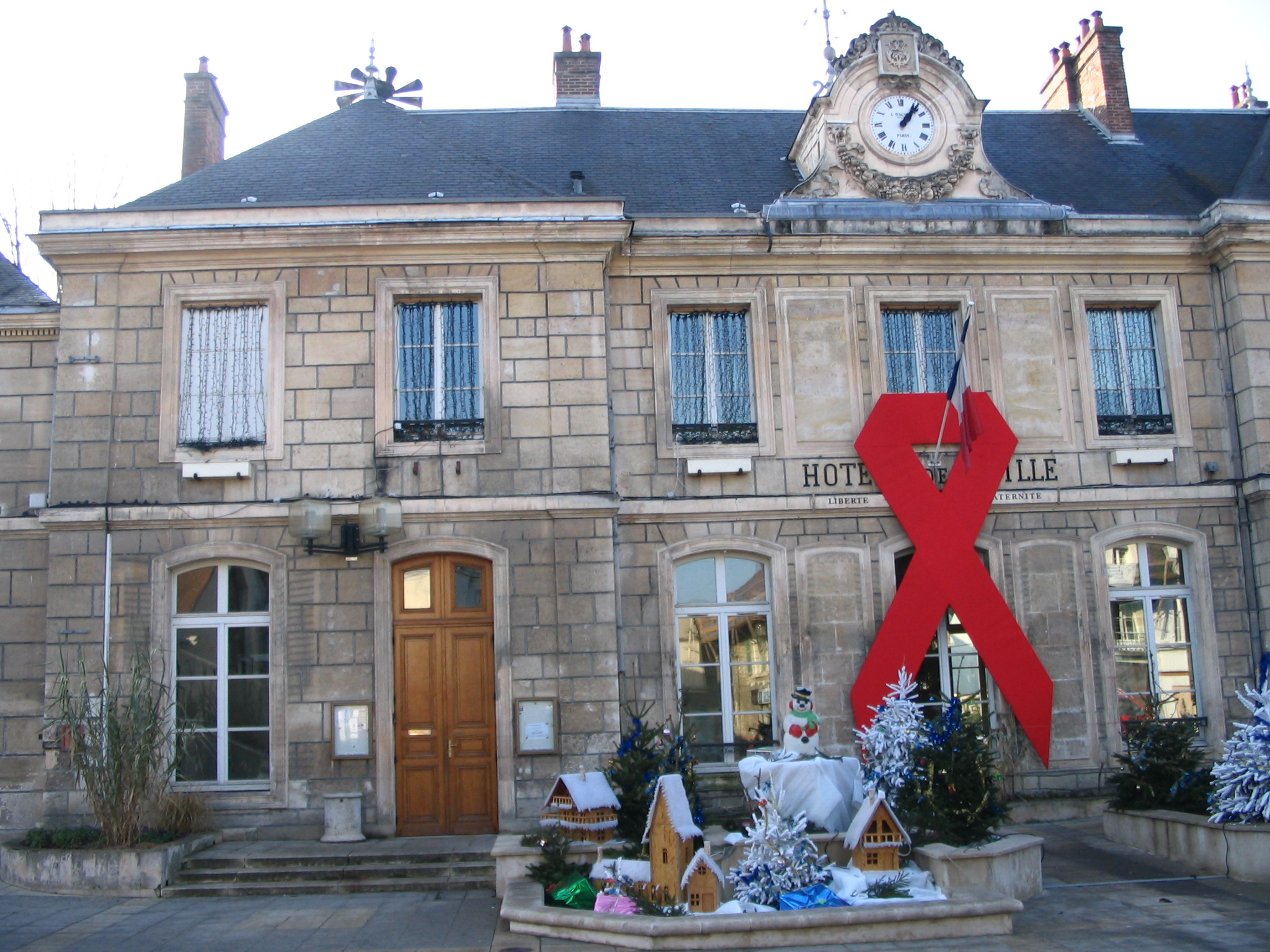
- The town hall in Chambly

- Coat of arms
- Location of Chambly
- Location within France Location within Hauts-de-France
- Coordinates: 49°10′02″N 2°14′56″E
- Country: France
- Region: Hauts-de-France
- Department: Oise
- Arrondissement: Senlis
- Canton: Méru

Government
  - Mayor (2020–2026): David Lazarus
- Area^{1}: 12.87 km^{2} (4.97 sq mi)
- Elevation: 37 m (121 ft)
- Highest elevation: 140 m (460 ft)
- Lowest elevation: 32 m (105 ft)
- Population (2023): 9,959
  - Density: 773.8/km^{2} (2,004/sq mi)
- Time zone: UTC+01:00 (CET)
  - Summer (DST): UTC+02:00 (CEST)
- INSEE/Postal code: 60139 /60230
- ^{1} French Land Register data, which excludes lakes, ponds, glaciers > 1 km^{2} (0.386 sq mi or 247 acres) and river estuaries.

Chambly (French pronunciation: [ʃɑ̃bli]) is a commune in the Oise department in northern France. Chambly station has rail connections to Beauvais and Paris.

== History ==
The medieval lordship of Chambly (seigneur de Chambly) was held by members of the House of Chambly. Pierre the Fat served as chamberlain under King Philip IV in the early 1300s.

== Population ==
Historical population
| Year | Pop. | ±% p.a. |
|---|---|---|
| 1968 | 5,614 | — |
| 1975 | 6,119 | +1.24% |
| 1982 | 6,105 | −0.03% |
| 1990 | 7,140 | +1.98% |
| 1999 | 9,138 | +2.78% |
| 2007 | 9,275 | +0.19% |
| 2012 | 9,740 | +0.98% |
| 2017 | 10,174 | +0.88% |
| 2023 | 9,959 | −0.36% |
Source: INSEE

== Sport ==
FC Chambly is based in the commune.

== See also ==
- Communes of the Oise department
