= Caroline Bonaparte =

- Princess Murat; Countess of Lipona
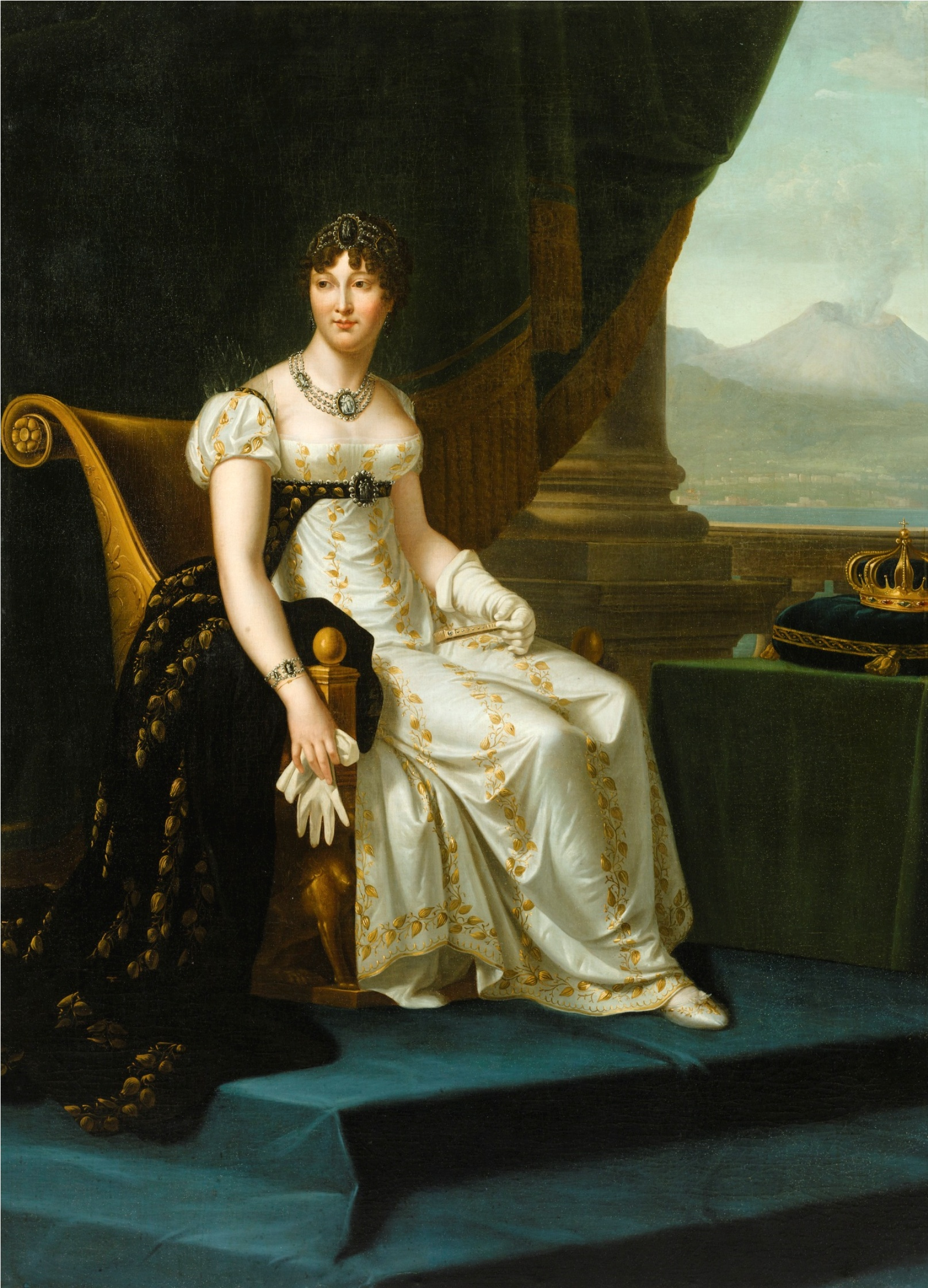
- Portrait by François Gérard, c. 1810–1812

Queen consort of Naples
- Tenure: 1 August 1808 – 20 May 1815

Grand Duchess consort of Berg
- Tenure: 15 March 1806 – 1 August 1808
- Born: 25 March 1782; Ajaccio, Corsica, Kingdom of France
- Died: 18 May 1839 (aged 57); Florence, Grand Duchy of Tuscany
- Burial: Chiesa di Ognissanti, Florence
- Spouse: Joachim Murat (m. 1800; died 1815) Francesco MacDonald (m. 1817; died 1837)
- Issue Detail: Achille Murat; Letizia Murat; Lucien Murat; Louise Murat
Names
- Carolina Maria Annunziata Bonaparte Murat
- House: Bonaparte (birth); Murat (marriage)
- Father: Carlo Buonaparte
- Mother: Letizia Ramolino
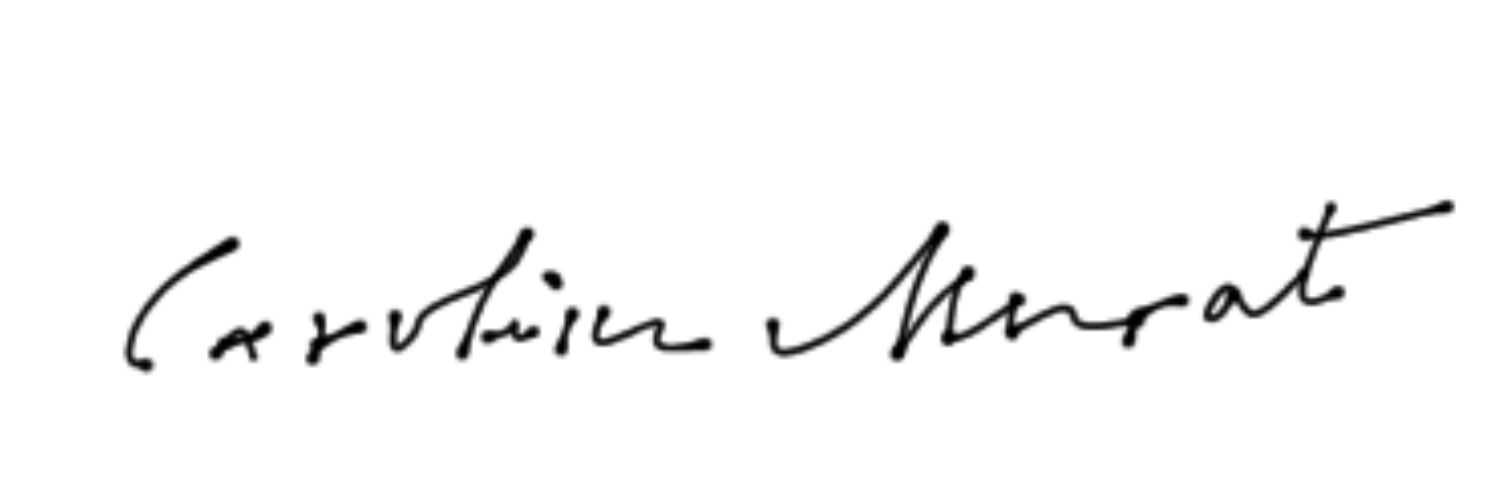
- Signature

Carolina Maria Annunziata Bonaparte (French: Caroline Marie Annunciata Bonaparte; 25 March 1782 – 18 May 1839), better known as Caroline Bonaparte, was an Imperial French princess; the seventh child and third daughter of Carlo Buonaparte and Letizia Ramolino, and a younger sister of Napoleon I of France. She was queen of Naples during the reign of her husband there, and regent of Naples during his absence four times: in 1812–1813, 1813, 1814, and 1815.

In 1800, Caroline married Joachim Murat, Marshal of the Empire, Prince Murat and later King of Naples, one of Napoleon's most important and notorious generals.

== Early years ==
The Bonaparte family includes Joseph Bonaparte, Napoléon Bonaparte, Lucien Bonaparte, Elisa Bonaparte, Louis Bonaparte, and Pauline Bonaparte. She was an older sister of Jérôme Bonaparte. Highly regarded for her beauty and intelligence, Caroline was also complex in temperament, ambitious and politically savvy.

"Of all my family, she is the one that resembles me the most".

— Napoleon on his sister Caroline

In 1793, Caroline moved with her family to France during the French Revolution. Caroline was educated as a pupil at the school in St-Germain-en-Laye founded by Madame Jeanne Campan. She attended the school at the same time as Hortense, Joséphine's daughter and Caroline's brother Louis' wife.

She fell in love with the flamboyant and charismatic Joachim Murat, one of her brother's senior cavalry commanders, and they married on 20 January 1800. Caroline was 17 years old. Initially, Napoleon did not wish to allow them to marry; however, his wife Joséphine de Beauharnais persuaded him to change his mind.

When Napoleon became Emperor, she and her sisters persuaded him to make them Imperial princesses.

== Queen consort of Naples ==
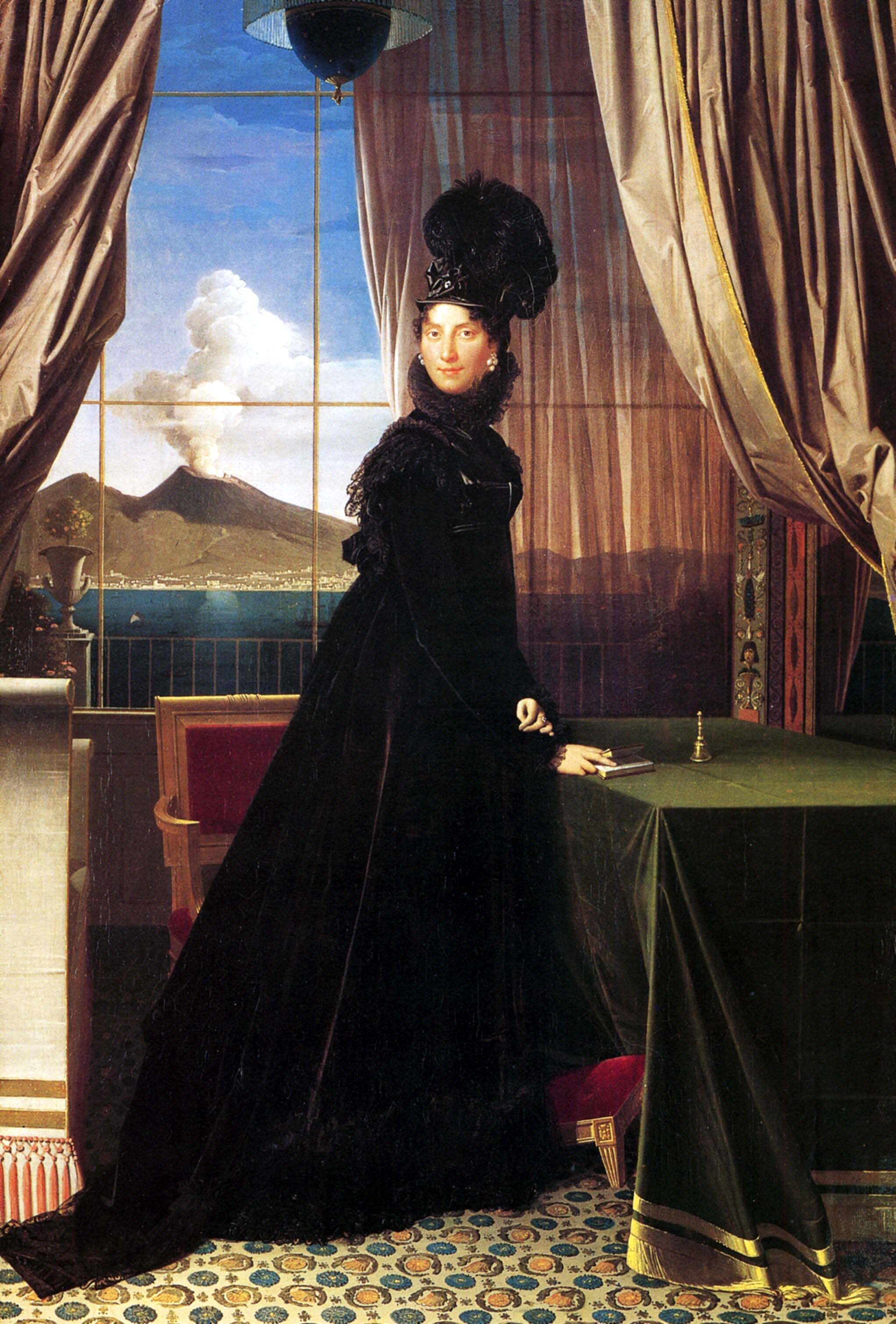
Portrait of Caroline Murat, Queen of Naples by Jean-Auguste-Dominique Ingres, 1814. Vesuvius can be seen in the background.

Caroline became Grand Duchess of Berg and Cleves on 15 March 1806 and Queen consort of Naples on 1 August 1808, when her husband was appointed to the equivalent positions by her brother. According to the terms of the appointment, she would keep the title queen also after his death.

As queen, Caroline renovated the royal residences in Naples, had new gardens planned, encouraged the growing interest in furniture of classical design, patronized the silk and cotton industry and French artists in Naples, showed an interest in the archaeological discoveries of Pompeii and founded a school for girls.

She was described as intensely jealous of her sister-in-law Joséphine and her children, reportedly because she felt Napoleon favored them over his Bonaparte relatives. It was reportedly Caroline who arranged for Napoleon to take a mistress, Éléonore Denuelle, who duly gave birth to his first illegitimate child. This had the desired effect of establishing that Joséphine was infertile, as Napoleon showed he was clearly capable of siring children, which eventually resulted in his divorce from Josephine and remarriage. In 1810, when Napoleon married his second Empress Consort Marie Louise of Austria, Caroline was responsible for escorting her to France. After meeting her at the border of Austria and her duchy, Caroline forced Marie Louise to leave all her luggage, servants, and even her pet dog, behind in Austria.

Caroline devoted herself to the interests of her husband Joachim Murat, the King of Naples, where she was very much involved in the affairs of the Kingdom. As queen of Naples, she functioned as the regent of Naples during the absence of Joachim on four occasions: during his participation in the war on Russia in 1812–1813, during his participation in the war in Germany in 1813, during the war against Napoleon in 1814, and, finally, during the return of Napoleon to power in 1815. In 1814, she supported his decision to make a separate peace with the anti-Napoleonic allies, keeping his throne while Napoleon was deposed.

Then, during the Hundred Days of 1815, Joachim came out for Napoleon. During his absence, Caroline was left as regent of Naples. Joachim was defeated and executed, and Caroline fled to the Austrian Empire. Whilst in exile, she adopted the title 'Countess of Lipona'; 'Lipona' being an anagram of 'Napoli' (Naples). During her exile, she had a companion named Francesco Macdonald, whom she later entered a morganatic marriage with in 1817.

== Death ==
After her husband's death, she lived in Florence until her death on 18 May 1839. Caroline was buried at the Chiesa di Ognissanti in Florence.

== Issue ==
Caroline and Joachim were the parents of four children:

- Achille Charles Louis Napoléon Murat, 2nd Prince Murat (21 January 1801, Paris – 15 April 1847, Jefferson County, Florida); married in Tallahassee, Florida, on 12 July 1826, Catherine Daingerfield Willis (17 August 1803 – 6 August 1867), daughter of Colonel Byrd C. Willis (29 August 1781 – 1846) and Mary Lewis, without issue.
- Princess Marie Letizia Joséphine Annonciade Murat (26 April 1802, Paris – 12 March 1859, Bologna); married in Venice, on 27 October 1823, Guido Taddeo Pepoli, Marchese Pepoli, Conte di Castiglione (7 September 1789, Bologna – 2 March 1852, Bologna), and had four children.
- Lucien Charles Joseph Napoléon Murat, 2nd Sovereign Prince of Pontecorvo, 3rd Prince Murat (16 May 1803, Milan – 10 April 1878, Paris); married in Bordentown, New Jersey, on 18 August 1831, Caroline Georgina Fraser (13 April 1810, Charleston, South Carolina – 10 February 1879, Paris), daughter of Thomas Fraser and wife, Anne Lauton, and had issue; he was an associate of his first cousin Napoleon III.
- Princess Louise Julie Caroline Murat (21 March 1805, Paris – 1 December 1889, Ravenna); married in Trieste, on 25 October 1825 Giulio Conte Rasponi (19 February 1787, Ravenna – 19 July 1876, Florence), had issue.

== Gallery ==
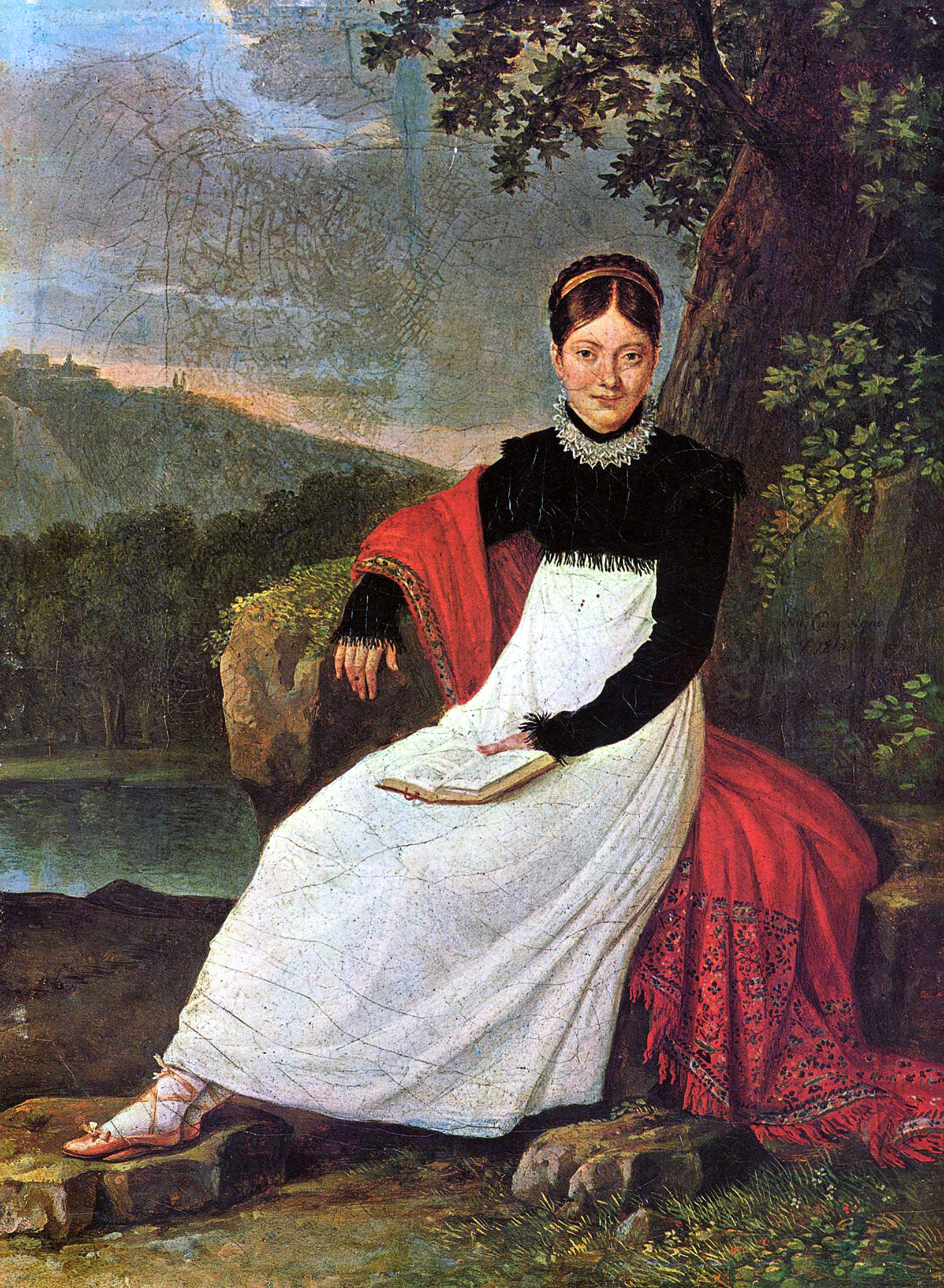
Caroline Bonaparte in traditional Neapolitan dress.

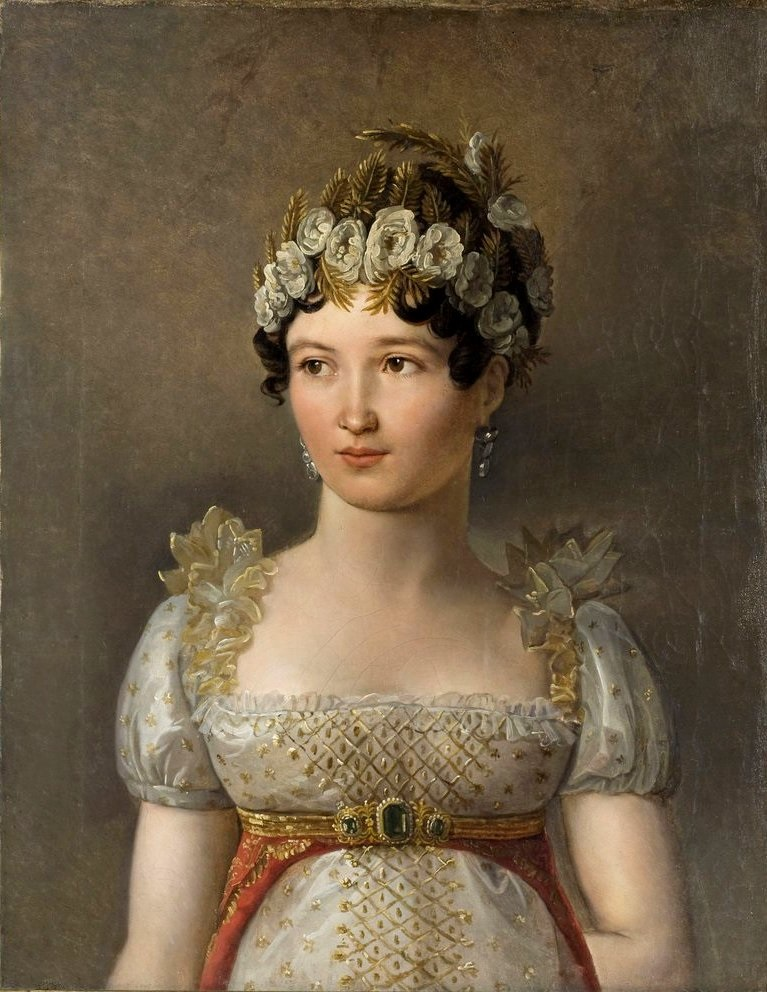
Princess Caroline Bonaparte.

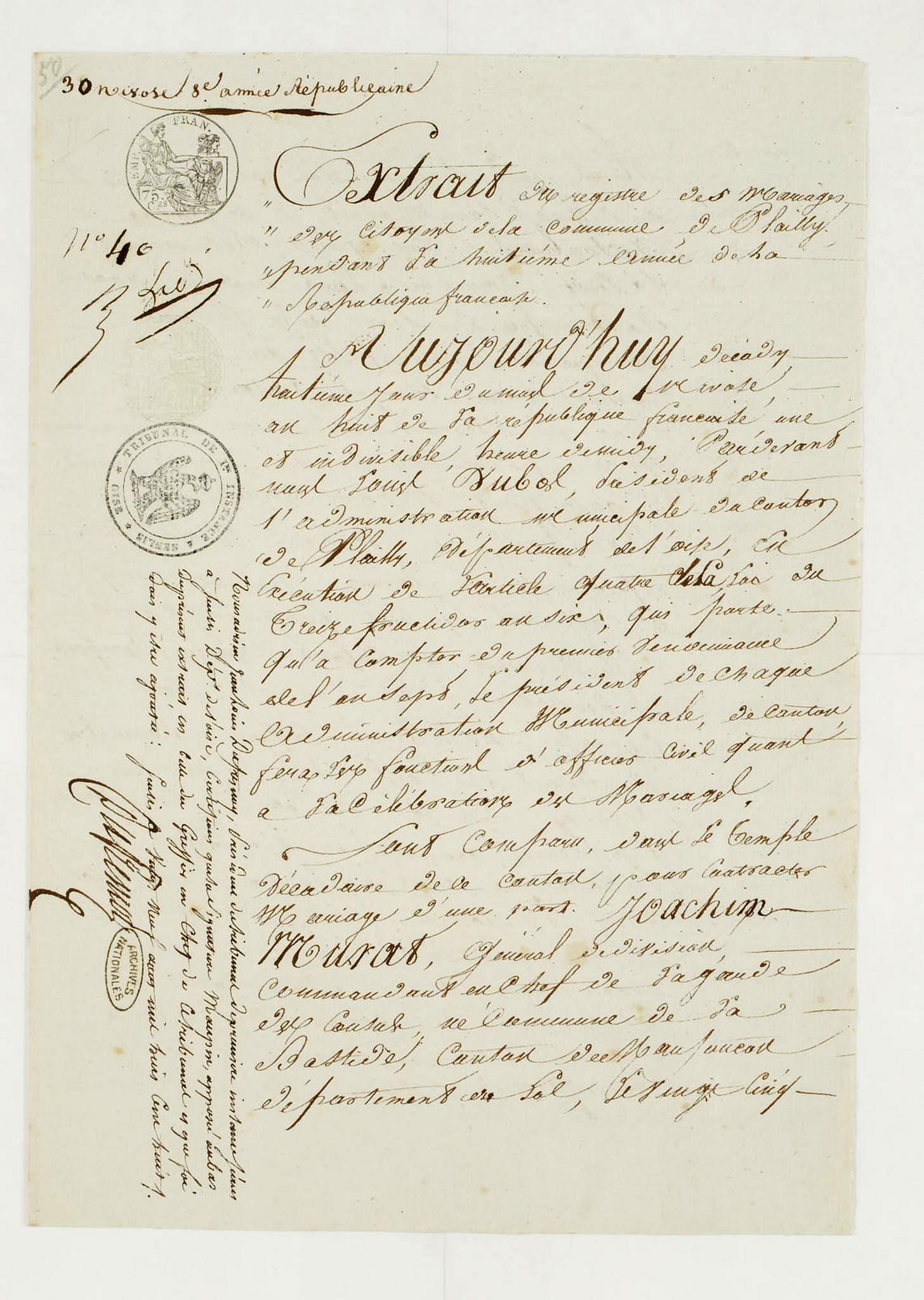
Marriage certificate of Joachim Murat and Caroline Bonaparte, now in the Archives nationales.

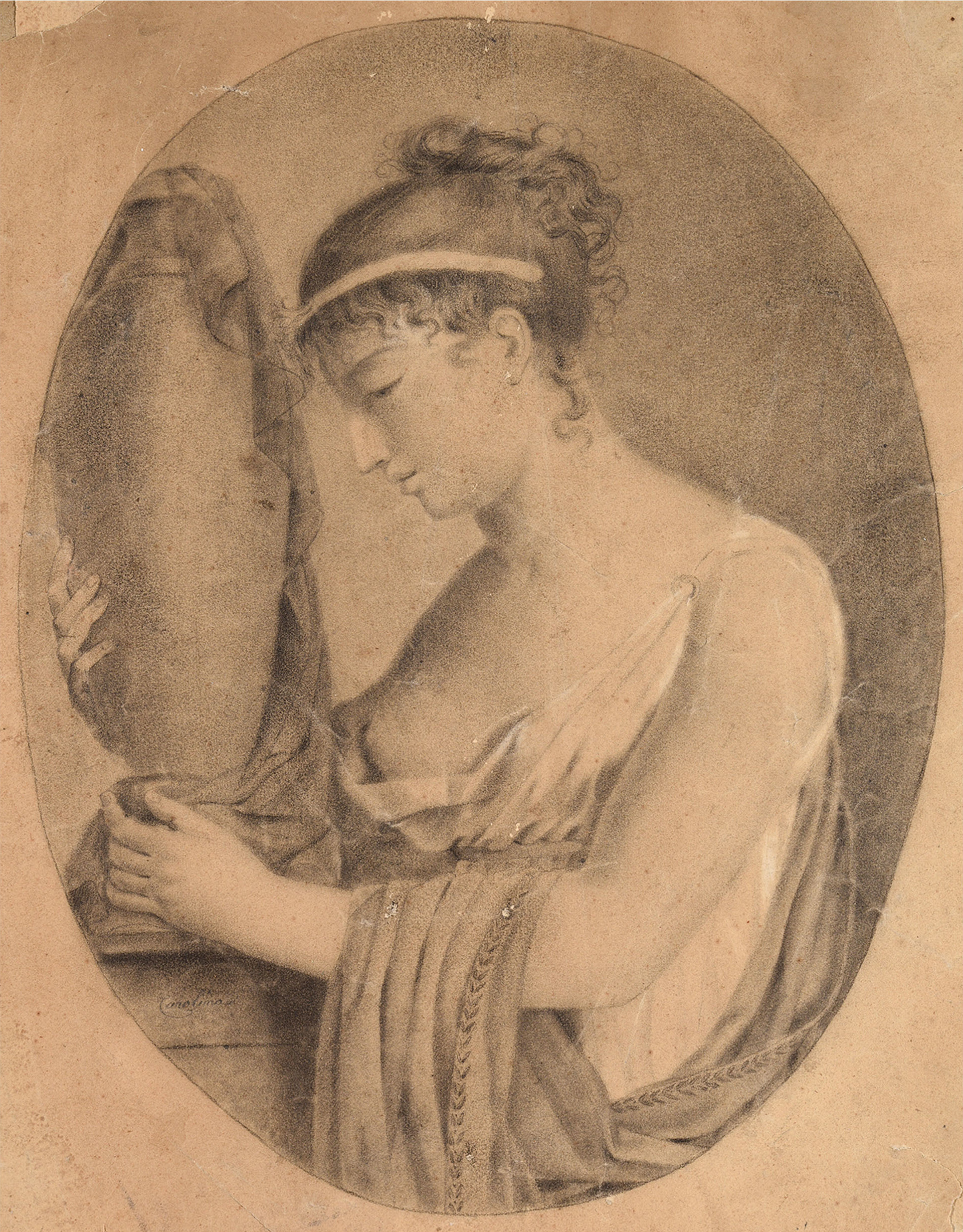
Caroline holding the urn containing the ashes of her dead husband, Joachim Murat.

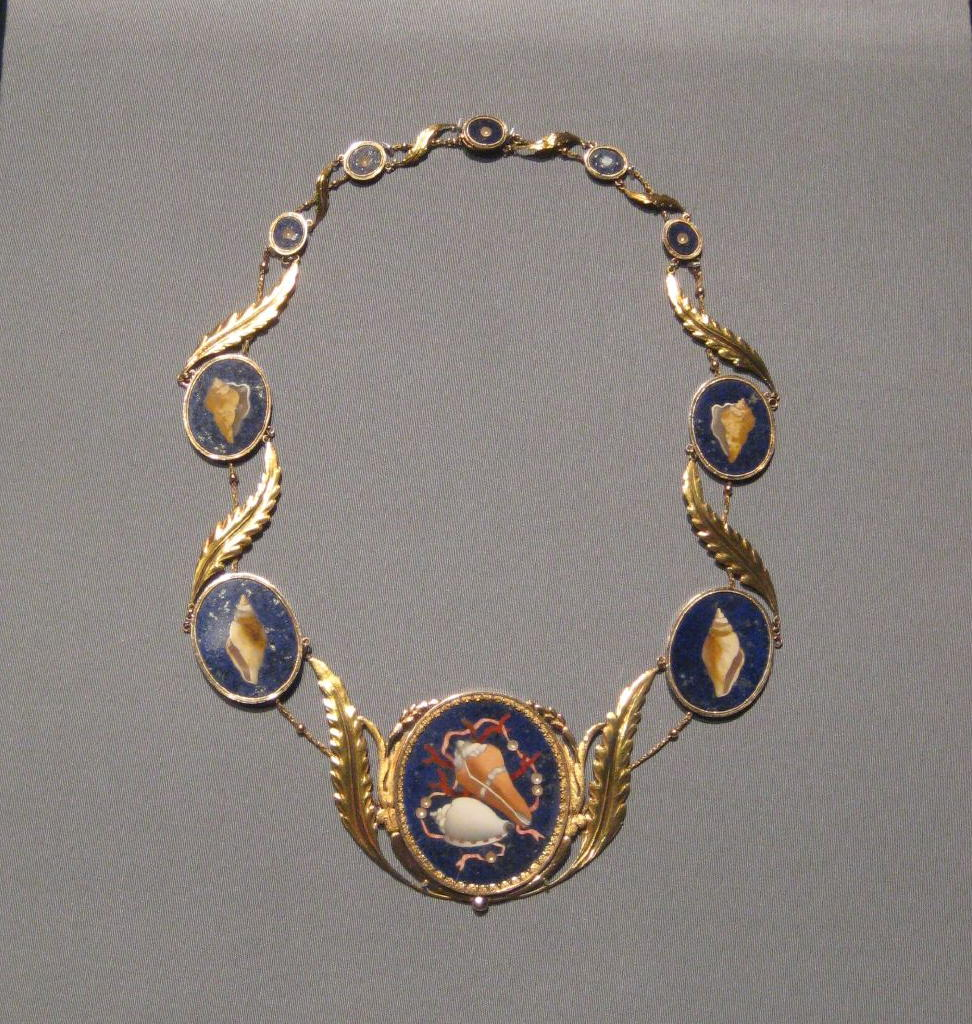
Jewelry of Caroline Bonaparte

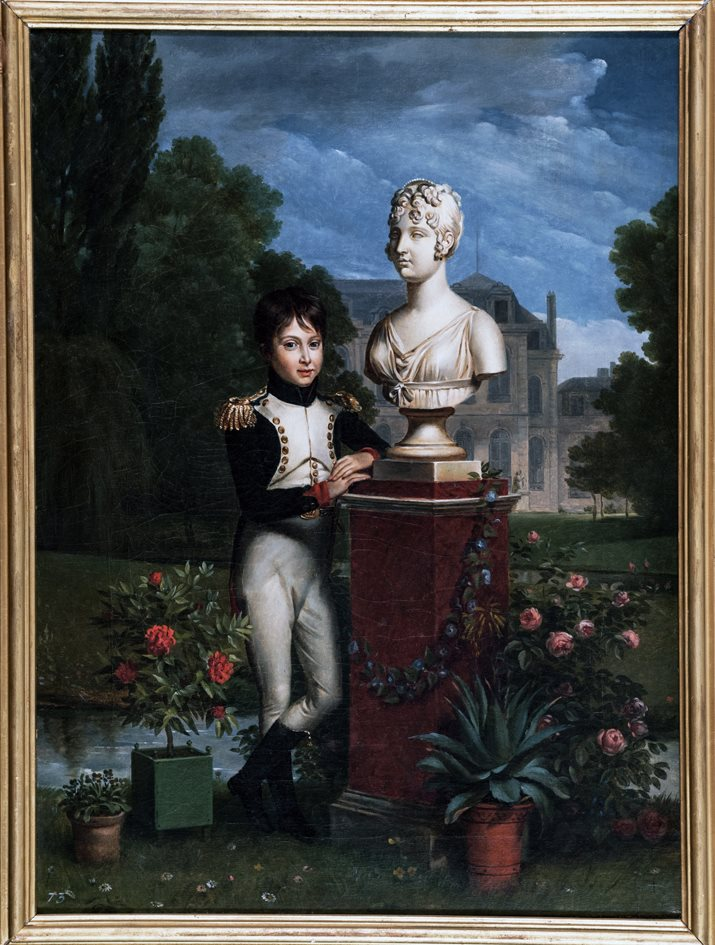
Achille Murat with the bust of his mother, 1811, by Benjamin de Rolland

== Notes and references ==
Preceded by Julie Clary	Queen consort of Naples; 1 August 1808–3 May 1815	Succeeded by María Isabella of Spain as Queen of the Two-Sicilies

=== Further reading ===
- Joan Bear, Caroline Murat (Collins, 1972)
- Hubert Cole, The Betrayers: The Tragedy of Joachim and Caroline Murat (Methuen, 1972)
- Margery Weiner, The Parvenu Princesses: Elisa, Pauline and Caroline Bonaparte (John Murray, 1964)
