= Pastré =

Pastré or Pastre may refer to:

== People ==
- Eugène Pastré (1806–1868), French shipowner from Marseille
- Geneviève Pastre (1924-2012), French poet and lesbian activist
- Count Jean Pastré (1888-1960), French polo player
- Jean-Baptiste Pastré (1804-1877), French banker and arms-dealer
- Faustin Jouët-Pastré (1866–1948), French Olympic sailor
- Jules Pastré (1810-1902), French banker, businessman and equestrian
- Countess Lily Pastré (a.k.a. Marie-Louise Double de Saint-Lambert) (1891-1974), French heiress and patron of the arts
- Michel Pastre (born 1966), French jazz saxophonist
- Nicole Véra Claire Hélène Maurice Pastré, 7th Princess Murat, wife of Joachim, 7th Prince Murat
- Olivier Pastré (born 1950), French banker and economist
- Ulysse Pastre (1864-1930), French politician

== Places ==
- Château Pastré, a chateau in Marseille.
