= Château Pastré =

Building in Marseille, France

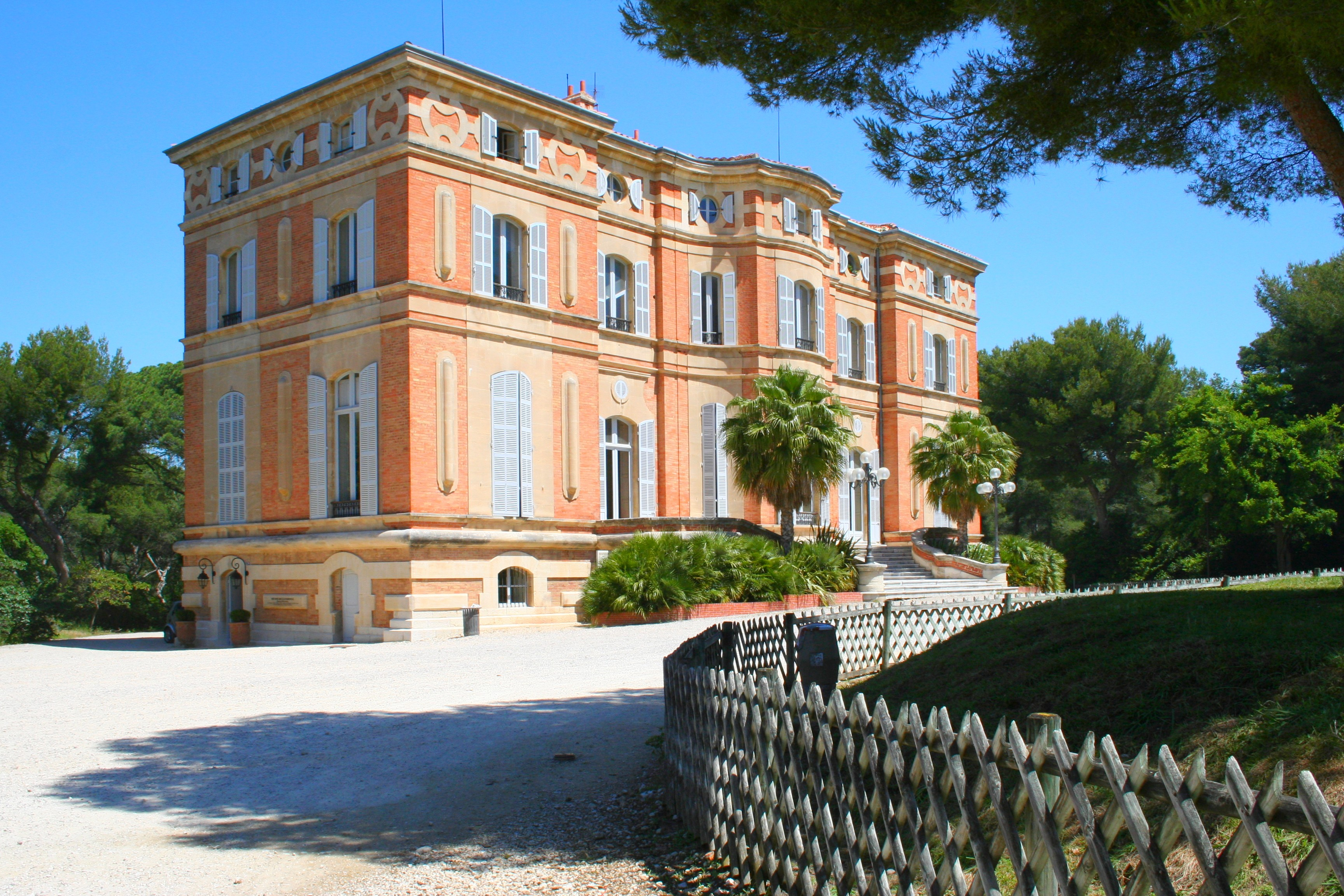
- Southern façade

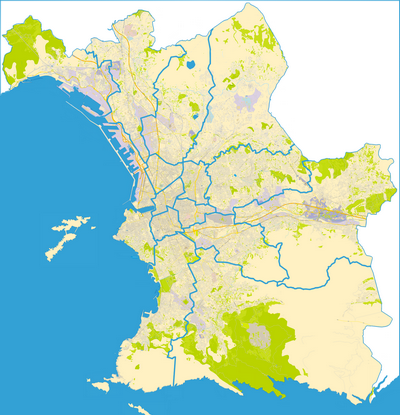
- Location within Marseille Location within France

General information
- Location: Marseille, 8th arrondissement, France
- Coordinates: 43°14′0″N 5°22′24″E
- Inaugurated: 1862

Design and construction
- Architect: Jean-Charles Danjoy

The Château Pastré (French pronunciation: [ʃato pastʁe]), formerly known as the Château de Montredon ([ʃato d(ə) mɔ̃(t)ʁ(ə)dɔ̃]), is a 19th-century building in the Montredon suburb in the south of Marseille, France. Originally the property of the wealthy merchant Pastré family, as of 2012, it housed a local faience pottery museum, the Musée de la Faïence de Marseille. The grounds of the château are a public park, known as the Campagne Pastré.

== Foundation ==
Eugène Pastré (1806–1868) and his wife Céline de Beaulincourt-Marle (1825–1900) belonged to a wealthy family of Marseille shipowners and merchants. Between 1836 and 1853, the Pastré family accumulated 120 hectares (300 acres) of land between Pointe Rouge and the Grotte Rolland in the south of Marseille, which they made into a park. The natural vegetation would have been scrub, Aleppo pines, oaks, laurel and juniper. Before the Canal de Marseille was constructed to this point, the family had to go to great lengths to obtain water, with which they irrigated and created lawns in the lower levels with gardens of vines, cereals and orchards of almonds, figs and apricot. The Pastrés had three large houses built in the park between 1845 and 1865: the Château Estrangin, Château Pastré and Château Sanderval.

== Building ==
The Parisian architect Jean-Charles Danjoy designed the Château Pastré, the largest of the buildings, completed in 1862. The three-story building was designed to meet the needs of its owners for a place where they could hold entertainments for many people. The Nouvelle Revue in its gossip section Chronique de L'Élégance in 1884, described a play being presented at the home of Mme Pastre.

The chateau is located between the hills of Marseilleveyre and the Mediterranean Sea, with large windows looking out over the park. The exterior design is elegant and warm. Jean Danjoy chose to design a reinterpretation of a building from the Louis XIII period. In the facade he blended bricks from Marseille with blonde stone from Arles. These meet in rhythmic curves and counter-curves.

== Past residents ==
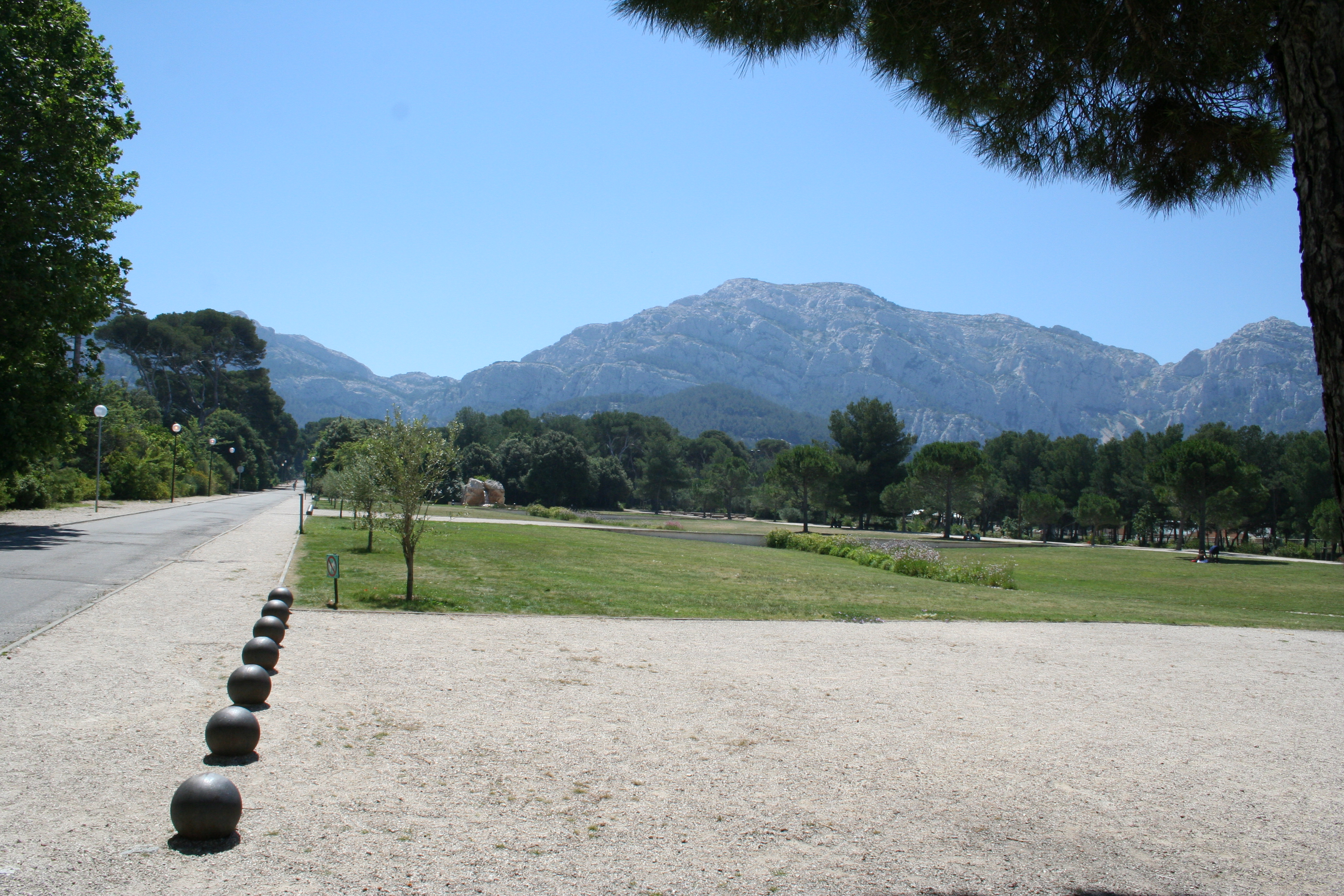
Campagne Pastré

Eugène and Céline's son Ange André Pastré (1856–1926) was made a Roman Count. (Note: A Roman Count, or Papal Count, is a title that may by given by the papal court to a person of good character who has made important contributions to society, the Church, and the Holy See. The title may by for life or may be hereditary through primogeniture in the male line.) He married Claire Goldschmidt around 1885, and they had four children: Odette, Diane (1888–1971), Jean André and Louis. Jean Pastré was born on 2 December 1888, in Marseille, and inherited the title of "Count". In 1918, he married Louise (Lily) Double. The couple had three children. Jean Pastré played on France's polo team in the 1924 Summer Olympic games. He died in Paris on 29 June 1960 at the age of 71. Their daughter Nadia Pastré helped in the escape lines for Allied prisoners during World War II.

Countess Lily Pastré was born Louise Double de Saint Lambert in 1891. Her mother Véra Magnan was partly Russian, and was granddaughter of Bernard Pierre Magnan, (Note: Bernard Pierre Magnan (1791-1865), who joined the army of Napoleon as a private soldier at the age of 18, rose through the ranks to captain and served at the Battle of Waterloo. He served with distinction in the army of the Bourbon regime, reaching the rank of general. After assisting in the 1851 coup d'état in which Napoleon III took power, he was made a Marshal of France.) a Marshal of France. Her father was Paul Double (1868–1935), son of Léon Double and Marie Prat (1849–1939). Marie Prat was the daughter of Claudius Prat (1814–1859), the co-founder of Noilly Prat. Countess Lily Pastre inherited the Noilly Prat vermouth fortune. After Countess Lily and Jean Pastré divorced in 1940, she continued to live at the Chateau de Montredon. She turned it into a refuge for artists fleeing the Nazi regime in occupied France, of whom many were Jewish.

Lily Pastré remained on good terms with the authorities, and invited them to concerts that she arranged at the chateau. At the same time, she was sheltering Jewish composers and musicians, of whom perhaps forty stayed at the chateau at different times. Norbert Glanzberg, who played piano for Édith Piaf, was hidden at the chateau at the singer's request. The Spanish cellist Pablo Casals and the American entertainer Josephine Baker both stayed at the chateau for a while, as did the pianist Clara Haskil. On 27 July 1942, Pastre arranged for a performance of A Midsummer Night's Dream at the chateau. A young Christian Dior made the costumes from the draperies of the chateau. The Orchèstre National de la Radiodiffusion Française, conducted by Manuel Rosenthal, provided music. The Germans occupied part of the chateau when they took over the south of France. They arrested and killed some of the guests found at the chateau.

After the war, Countess Lily contributed to the foundation of the Aix-en-Provence Festival of music and arts. She died in 1974, having spent her entire fortune helping others, much of it during the war.

== Recent years ==
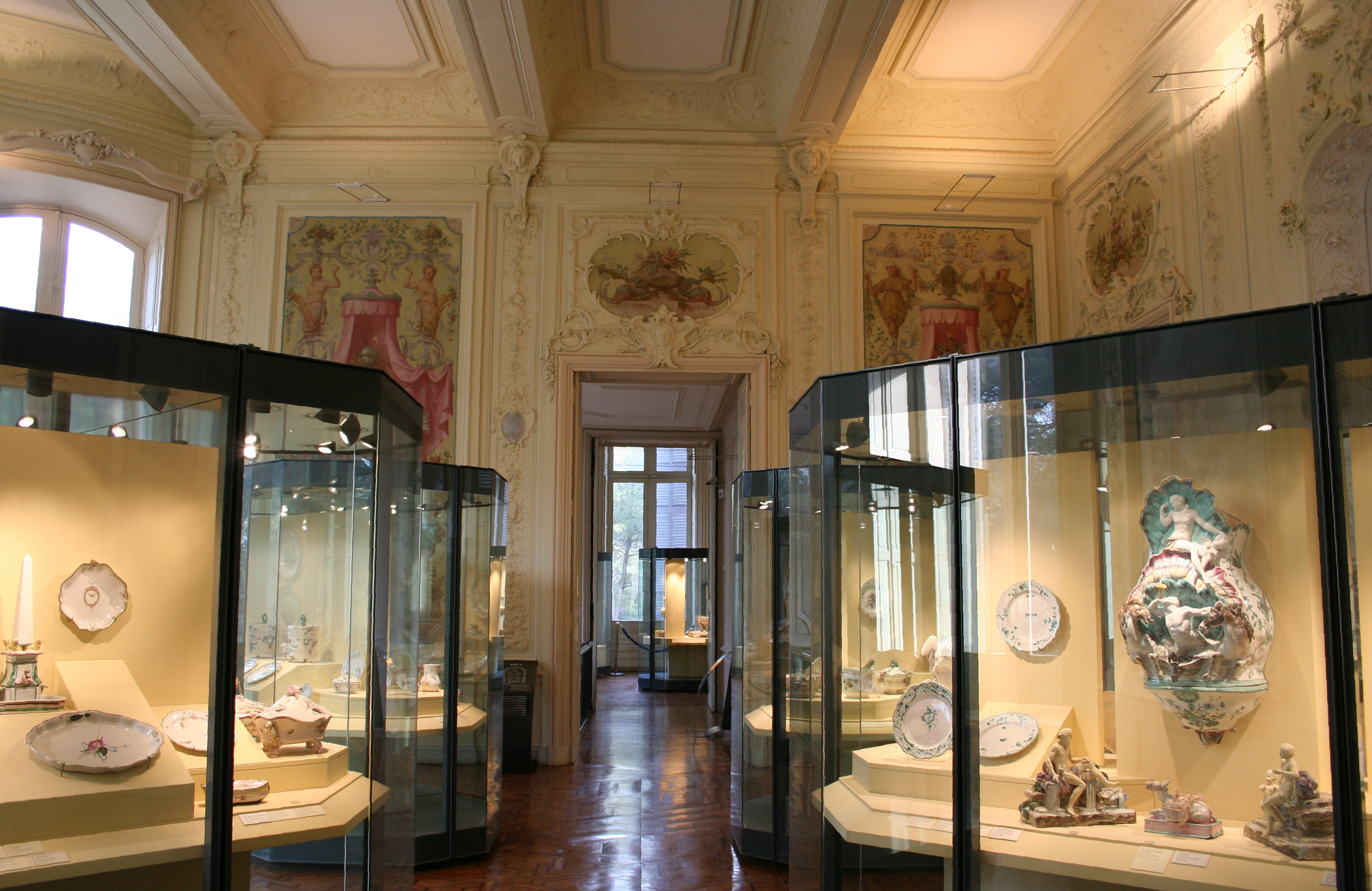
Interior of the Faïence Museum

Between 1966 and 1987, the city of Marseille bought almost all of the property, including the Château Pastré, Château Sanderval and the bastide Clary. It had the Château Pastré carefully restored. Since May 1995, it has housed the Faïence Museum, and displays more than 1,500 pieces crafted during a period spanning more than 7000 years.

Marseille has been chosen as the "European cultural capital" for 2013. As part of the preparation for this, the government plans to transfer the Faïence Museum to the Château Borély, which will be adapted for the planned Museum of Decorative Arts and Fashion.

The grounds are now a public park commonly known as the Campagne Pastré. Of this, 12 hectares (30 acres) are formally laid out with lawns, woods and two artificial lakes, while 100 hectares (250 acres) have more natural vegetation. The central avenue from the entrance to the chateau is over 900 metres (3,000 ft) long. Apart from the lakes, the park includes playgrounds, canal areas and hiking trails. The gardens are decorated with statues. From a steep hill, visitors have views of Marseille. The entire forested area of the park is part of the Calanques World Heritage Site. In 2021, the association Pour Que Marseille Vive proposed to rehabilitate the Château Pastré by installing an artists' incubator and a cultural place there. The project was in negotiation with the town hall of Marseille.
