= Joachim, 7th Prince Murat =

Joachim Murat
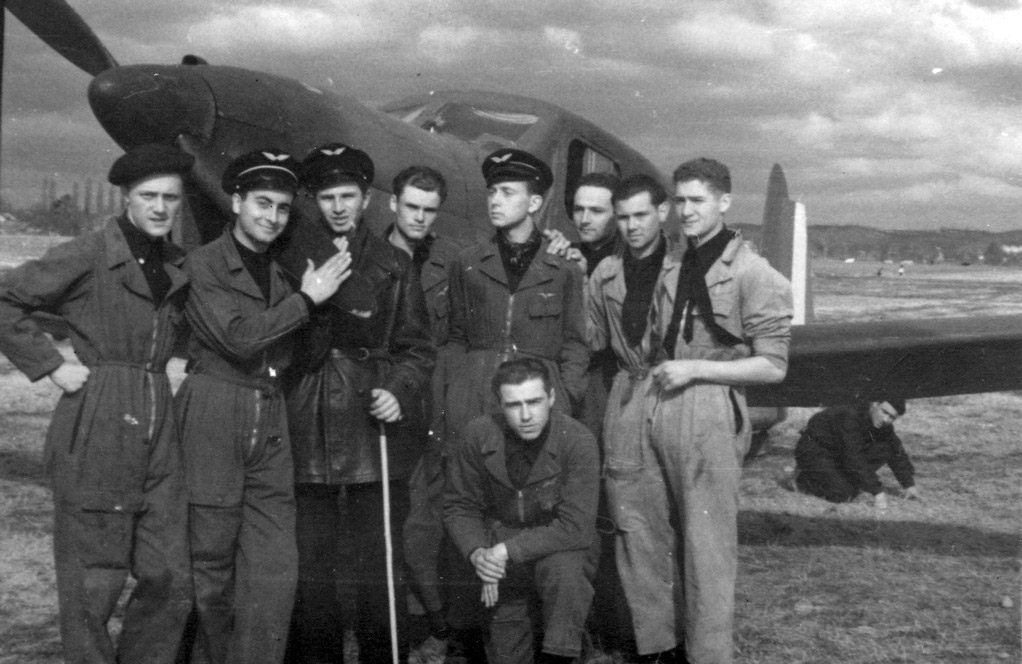
- Joachim, 7th Prince Murat (3rd from the left)

Prince Murat
- Tenure: 11 May 1938 – 20 July 1944
- Predecessor: Joachim, 6th Prince Murat
- Successor: Joachim, 8th Prince Murat
- Born: 16 January 1920; Neuilly-sur-Seine, France
- Died: 20 July 1944 (aged 24); Lingé, France
- Spouse: Nicole Véra Claire Hélène Pastré (m. 1940)
- Issue: Princess Caroline Murat; Princess Malcy Murat; Joachim Murat, 8th Prince Murat
- House: Murat
- Father: Joachim, 6th Prince Murat
- Mother: Louise Plantié

Joachim Napoléon Murat, 7th Prince Murat (16 January 1920 – 20 July 1944) was a French soldier and Head of the Bonaparte-Murat noble family, descended from Joachim Murat, 1st Prince Murat and Caroline Bonaparte, sister of Napoleon. He was killed fighting for the French Resistance during World War II.

== Biography ==
Murat was a member of the French Resistance during World War II. He was killed by a patrol of the Das Reich Division on 20 July 1944, aged twenty-four. Maxime Weygand said of him: "A young officer distinguished by his zealousness and courage, a true leader of men."

Before his death, Murat was married on 18 August 1940, in Marseille to Nicole Véra Claire Hélène Pastré (1921–1992), the daughter of Countess Lily Pastré, a philanthropist who founded the Aix-en-Provence Festival in 1948, and Count Jean Pastré, a polo player who played polo at the 1924 Summer Olympics.

They had three children:

- Princess "Caroline" Marie Louise Murat (b. 1941): Married in 1962 to Count Yves de Parcevaux, (b. 1936) and divorced. Married in 1967 to Miklós Klobusiczky de Klobusicz et Zétény (b. 1946). Her children are:
  - Count Amaury de Parcevaux (b. 1963).
  - Patricia Klobusiczky de Klobusicz et Zétény (b. 1968).
  - Arielle Klobusiczky de Klobusicz et Zétény (b. 1971).
- Princess Madeleine Marie Annonciade "Malcy" Murat (1943–1990).
- "Joachim" Louis Napoleon Murat, 8th Prince Murat (b. 1944), current head of the House of Bonaparte-Murat: Married Laurence Mouton and had issue.

== Awards ==
Medals:

- Croix de Guerre avec Palme (War Cross with Palm)
- Légion d'Honneur (posthumous)

== Ancestry ==
Ancestors of Joachim, 7th Prince Murat

8. Joachim, 4th Prince Murat
4. Joachim, 5th Prince Murat
9. Malcy Berthier de Wagram
2. Joachim, 6th Prince Murat
10. Michel Ney, 3rd Duke of Elchingen
5. Cécile Ney d'Elchingen
11. Paule Furtado-Heine
1. Joachim, 7th Prince Murat
12. Théodore Plantié
6. Eugène Plantié
13. Saubade Amélie Villa
3. Louise Plantié
14. Joseph Guiraud
7. Gabrielle Guiraud
15. Marie Justine Compans

French nobility of the First French Empire
Preceded by Joachim, 6th Prince Murat	Prince of Pontecorvo; 1932–1938	Vacant Title next held by Joachim, Prince of Pontecorvo
Preceded by Joachim, 6th Prince Murat	Prince Murat; 1938–1944	Vacant Title next held by Joachim, 8th Prince Murat
