= Jean-Charles Danjoy =

French architect (1806–1862)

Jean-Charles-Léon Danjoy
- Born: 31 May 1806; Avensac, Gers, France
- Died: 4 September 1862 (aged 56); Paris, France
- Occupation: Architect
- Buildings: Château de Falaise, Meaux, cathédrale Saint-Etienne, Château Pastré

Jean-Charles-Léon Danjoy (31 May 1806 – 4 September 1862) was a French architect who specialised in renovating historical buildings.

== Biography ==
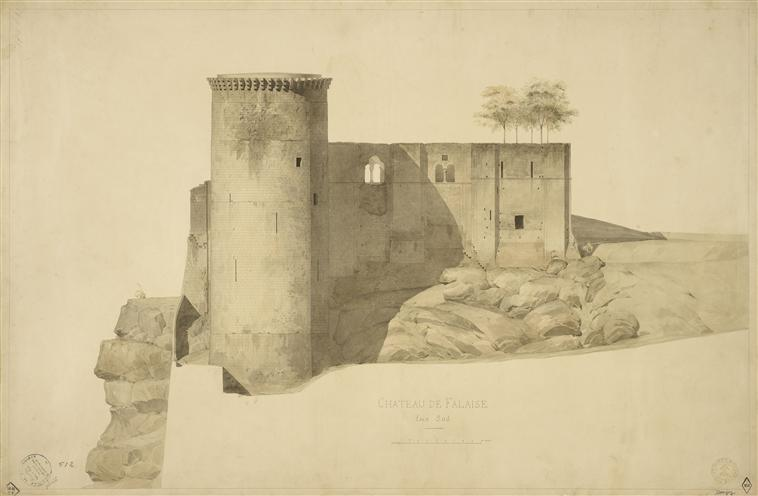
South façade of the Château de Falaise

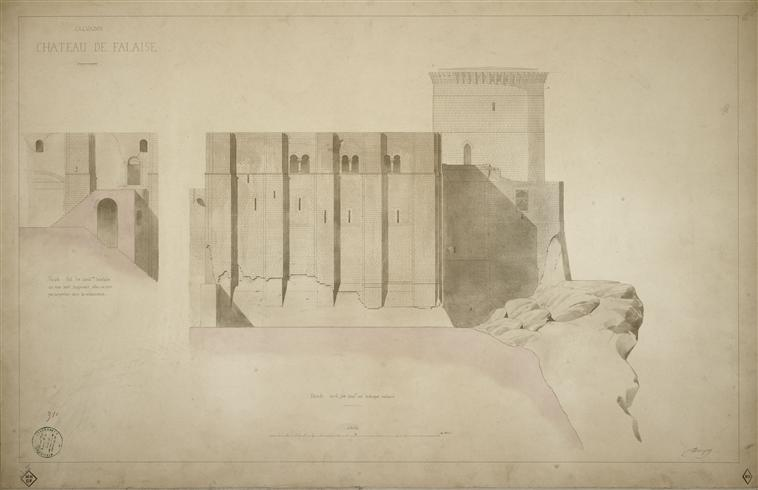
North façade of the Château de Falaise

Danjoy was born on 31 May 1806 in Avensac in the Gers department of southwestern France. In 1827 he was admitted to the École des Beaux-Arts in Paris. There he studied in the studio of Jean-Nicolas Huyot. As a young man he struggled to make a living through the sale of architectural drawings and lithographs.

In 1840 Danjoy was hired by the French Historic Monuments organization, which had been created in 1837, and was given responsibility for restoring the Château de Falaise. Other restoration projects included the church of Lisieux Cathedral, the Château de Saint-Sauveur-le-Vicomte in Manche, the Tour Pey-Berland in Bordeaux and the Collégiale de Braisne. In 1842 he won the gold prize in an open competition to design the tomb of Napoleon. He visited Spain in 1842, where he made a drawing of the Monastery of Benevívere, later published in a collection of lithographs of Spanish monuments.

In 1843 Danjoy submitted a plan for restoration of Notre Dame de Paris in competition with Jean-Jacques Arveuf and with the winning team of Jean-Baptiste Lassus and Eugène Viollet-le-Duc. That year he was given responsibility for restoring Meaux Cathedral. Around 1845 he was architect of a house in Auteuil in the Gothic style. He designed the Princess Demidoff's tomb in Père Lachaise Cemetery. Danjoy was given responsibility for restoring Bordeaux Cathedral in 1847 and Metz Cathedral in 1848.

In 1853 Danjoy was selected as architect for the Arc de Triomphe de l'Étoile, replacing Guillaume-Abel Blouet. (Note: Danjoy did not design the Arc de Triomphe, which had already been completed by Guillaume-Abel Blouet. He was responsible for maintenance.) In 1853 Danjoy was named architect for the diocese of Meaux, Bordeaux and Coutances. This position included maintaining or restoring all aspects of the diocese buildings including the decor, and often the furniture. He decorated the chapel of Saint-Joseph in Bordeaux Cathedral, and undertook major restoration work there. He began plans for the seminary at Coutances, but died before the work could start.

Danjoy created the design for the Château Pastré in Marseille, commissioned by the shipowner and merchant Eugène Pastré (1806-1868) and his wife, Céline de Beaulincourt-Marle. Completed in 1862, the chateau is now home of the Musée de la Faïence de Marseille. Danjoy died on 4 September 1862 in Paris. His son Eugène Gustave Édouard Danjoy (1838-1905) was also a successful architect. Édouard was taught by his father and by Charles Questel, then worked under Léon Vaudoyer.

== Appraisal ==
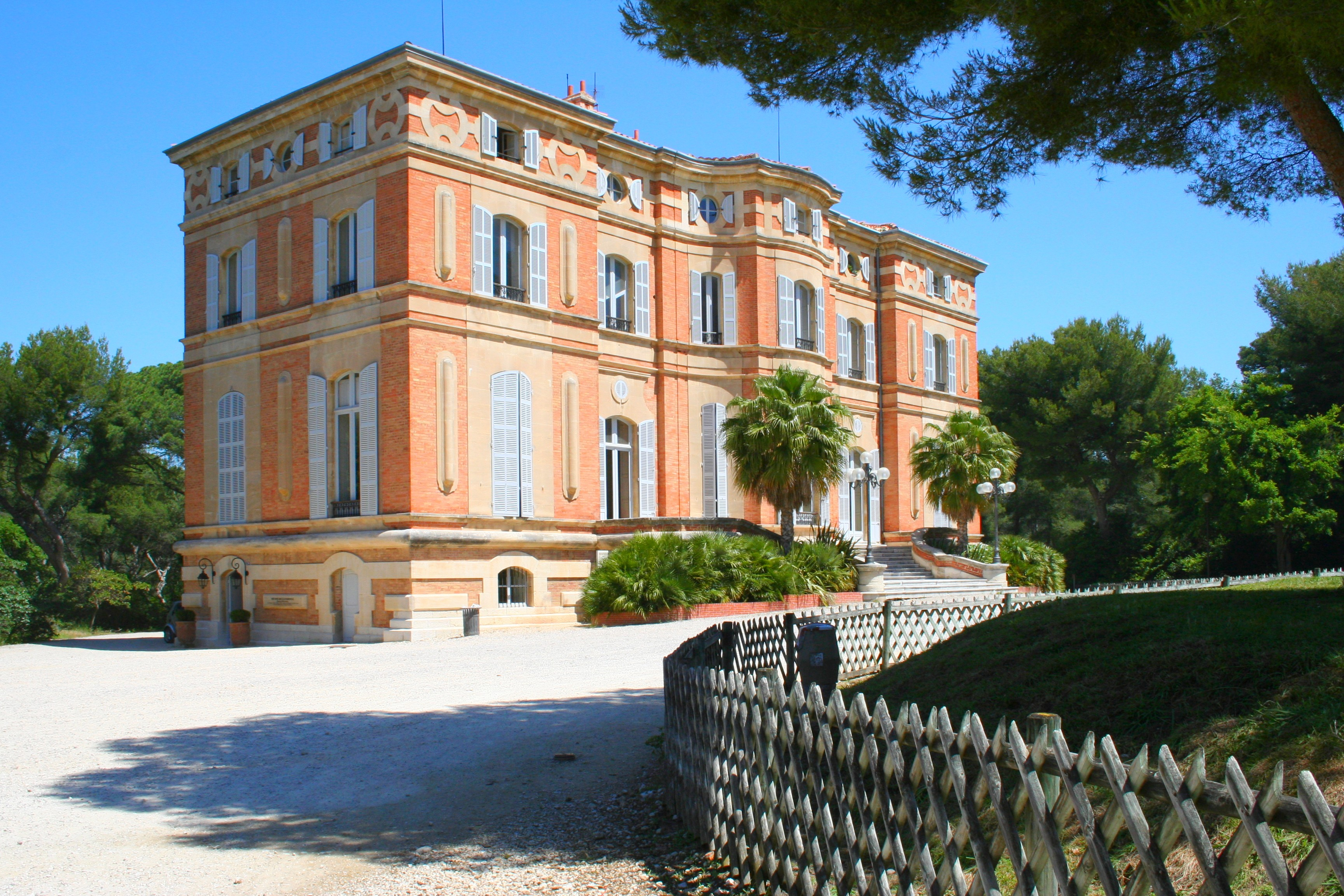
Château Pastré in Marseille

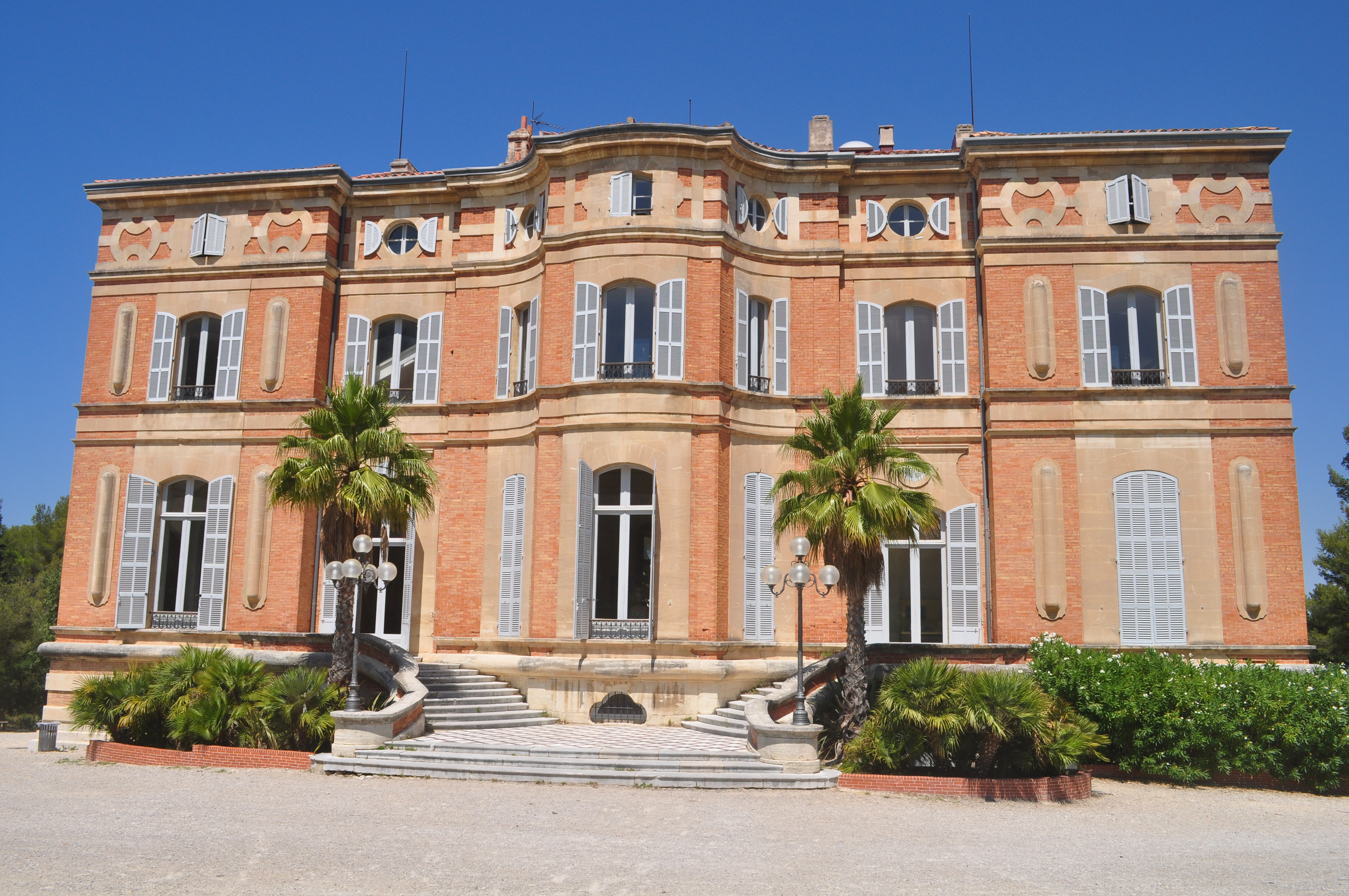

In 1845 Danjoy was awarded a gold medal for his restoration work with the Commission of Historical Monuments. In 1850 he won a gold medal for his plans to restore the Metz Cathedral. Danjoy showed a fine artistic sense in his work, as well as serious knowledge of archaeology. However, one of the judges of the Notre Dame competition considered that his plans paid too much attention to the religious aspects of the building and not enough to the historical.

Danjoy was considered for the Legion of Honor. Viollet-le-Duc praised the work that he had done in difficult circumstances in Meaux and recommended that he be decorated for his services to the arts. Reynaud described him as an artist of the first order, with a highly developed sense of form, rich in poetic ideas that he was able to express with charm and a rare distinction. He also supported giving Danjoy the decoration. Hamille, however, cautioned that he was not practical. His projects had caused many problems to the authorities, and granting the decoration could rekindle the controversy.

== Drawings ==
Drawings by Danjoy include:

- Elevations and plans of the Château de Falaise
- Abbaye Sainte-Madeleine-Postel, Saint-Sauveur-le-Vicomte
- Grand Séminaire de Coutances, renovation and enlargement
- 1844 Elevation for church at Cerisy-la-Forêt
- 1845 Side elevation of Eglise Saint-Martin of Montmorency
- 1845 Meaux, old episcopal palace, now a museum
- 1850 Elevation of a plan for the painted wall of the chapel of Saint-Joseph in Bordeaux Cathedral
- 1850 Meaux, Cathédrale Saint-Etienne, elevations and plans
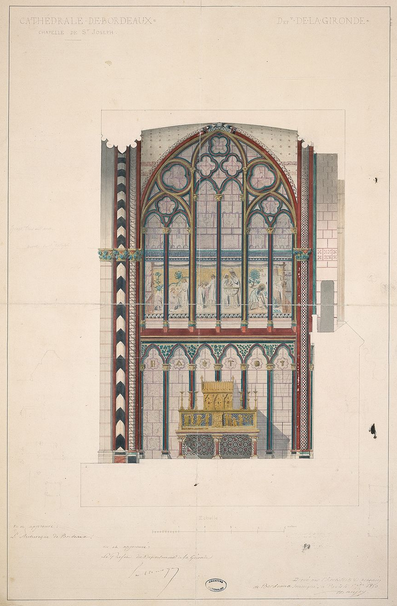
Wall of chapel of Saint-Joseph in Bordeaux Cathedral (1850)

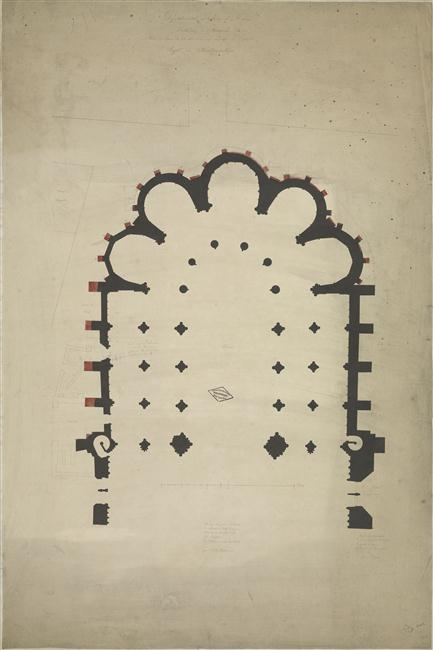
Meaux, cathédrale Saint-Etienne (1850)

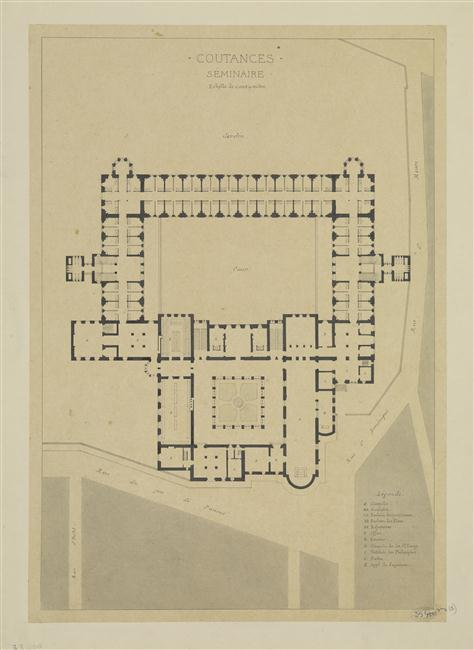
Grand Séminaire de Coutances

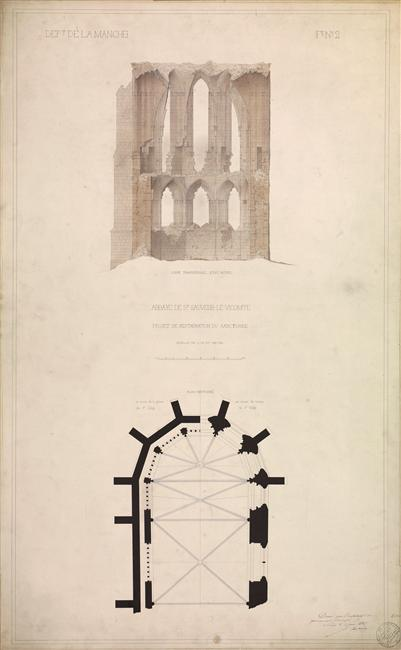
Abbaye Sainte-Madeleine-Postel

== Sources ==
- Ballantyne, Andrew (2010). Rural and Urban: Architecture Between Two Cultures. Taylor & Francis. ISBN 978-0-415-55212-7.
- Bauchal, Charles (1887). "Danjoy (Jean-Charles-Léon)". Nouveau dictionnaire biographique et critique des architects français. André, Daly fils. p. 631.
- Camille, Michael (2009-06-15). The Gargoyles of Notre-Dame: Medievalism and the Monsters of Modernity. University of Chicago Press. ISBN 978-0-226-09245-4.
- Daly, César (1862). "Nécrologie". Revue générale de l'architecture et des travaux publics: journal des architectes, des ingénieurs, des archéologues des industriels et des propriétaires. Ducher et cie. p. 200.
- "DANJOY Eugène, Gustave, Édouard". Éditions en ligne de l'École des chartes (ELEC).
- "En el Monasterio de Benevívere". Biblioteca Digital de Castilla y León.
- Fiori, Ruth (27 October 2011). "DANJOY Léon Jean-Charles".
- Gastaldi, Nadine (2012). "Les édifices de culte sous le régime du Concordat". 1643-1945 L'Histoire par L'Image. Ministry of Culture.
- "Jean-Charles-Léon Danjoy (1806-1862)". La Médiathèque de l'architecture et du patrimoine. Archived from the original on 2008-12-04.
- "Le Château Pastré". Camping Marius. Archived from the original on 2011-09-20.
- Leniaud, Jean-Michel (2012). "DANJOY Jean-Charles (Léon Jean Charles, dit)". Elec. École nationale des chartes.
- Marionneau, Claude Charles (1861). Description des œuvres d'art qui décorent les édifices publics de la ville de Bordeaux.
- Oulebsir, Nabila (2004-01-01). Les usages du patrimoine: Monuments, musées et politique coloniale en Algérie, 1830-1930. Editions MSH. p. 184. ISBN 978-2-7351-1006-3.
- "Votre recherche Danjoy jean-charles". Moteur Collections. Ministry of Culture. Archived from the original on 2008-01-12.
