= Bernard Lefort =

French opera singer

Bernard Lefort (29 July 1922 – 19 January 1999), was a French lyric baritone, and later an opera director.

== Biography ==
Born in Paris, Lefort was a pupil of the Institution Notre-Dame de Sainte-Croix and then sang in the college choir of the Schola (the Petits chanteurs de Sainte-Croix de Neuilly).

He then began a career as a baritone, mainly in French mélodies (Germaine Tailleferre composed for him her Concerto des vaines paroles, for baritone and orchestra in 1956), but also in operetta and opera (he performed in the mid-1950s au Théâtre du Châtelet and at the Paris Opera). He stopped singing for health reasons in the late 1950s.

He then became Artistic Director of the Lausanne Festival, then directed the Opéra de Marseille from 1965 to 1968. He will then lead the Festival d'automne à Paris, le Festival de Royaumont, then the Paris Opera, and finally the Aix-en-Provence Festival from 1974 to 1982 (where he succeeded Gabriel Dussurget).

Preceded by Gabriel Dussurget	director of the Aix-en-Provence Festival; 1974–1982	Succeeded by Louis Erlo
Preceded by Rolf Liebermann	director of the Paris Opera; 1980-1982	Succeeded by Massimo Bogianckino
