= Sidi Abu al-Ikhlas al-Zarqani =

20th-century Sufi mystic

Personal life
- Born: Al-Sayyid Burhan al-Din Abu al-Ikhlas al-Zarqani; 1924 Gharbia Governorate of Egypt
- Died: 1979 (aged 55) Alexandria, Egypt
- Resting place: Sidi Abu al-Ikhlas al-Zarqani Mosque (until 2019)
- Era: 20th century CE
- Region: Northeast Africa

Religious life
- Religion: Islam
- Denomination: Sunni
- Jurisprudence: Maliki
- Tariqa: Shadhili
- Creed: Ash'ari
- Movement: Sufism

Al-Sayyid Burhan al-Din Abu al-Ikhlas al-Zarqani (1924–1979) shortly known as Sidi Abu al-Ikhlas al-Zarqani (Arabic: سيدي أبو الإخلاص الزرقاني) was a 20th-century Sufi mystic who lived in Egypt. He was part of the Shadhili order of Sufis, and his Mawlid feast is still celebrated annually.

== Life ==
Al-Sayyid Burhan al-Din Abu al-Ikhlas al-Zarqani was born in 1924, in a village located in the Gharbia Governorate of Egypt. In his youth, Abu al-Ikhlas lived in Cairo with his extended family but later returned to his hometown in the Gharbia Governorate, before returning again to pursue a scholarship at Al Azhar University on recommendation of his uncle, a renowned Muslim scholar who had taught him the basics of religion ever since he was a young child. In his adulthood, Abu al-Ikhlas went on a spiritual tour to Sudan, Morocco, Yemen, Jerusalem and Medina. Upon his return to Egypt, he started an ascetic lifestyle, later building a small zawiya for himself in Alexandria; he would eventually die in 1979 and be entombed in his zawiya.

== Death and burial ==
In 1979, Abu al-Ikhlas died and he was buried in his zawiya next to his sister, Umm Muhammad. The zawiya was incorporated into a larger religious complex in 1985 which was attached to a mosque known as the Sidi Abu al-Ikhlas al-Zarqani Mosque. In 2019, the mosque and the adjoining complex was demolished by the Egyptian authorities as it stood in the way of the construction of a large integrated traffic axis that leads to El Mahmoudiyah. The remains of Abu al-Ikhlas and his sister were exhumed and then reinterred in a new mausoleum, also located in Alexandria. The actions of the government did not have much negativity from the Sufi communities, who accepted the decision to demolish the mosque and religious complex without any frustrations.

== Legacy ==
Among locals, Al-Sayyid Burhan al-Din Abu al-Ikhlas al-Zarqani is known for his mystical powers, known as karamat. Additionally, the Mawlid feast for his birthday is still celebrated every year in the month of October, and it lasts for almost one week. During his lifetime, Abu al-Ikhlas was also the founder of a Sufi order, or tariqa, known as the Ikhlasiyya which was a subsect of the Shadhili order.

== See also ==
- List of Sufis
