= Joachim, Prince of Pontecorvo =

Joachim Murat
- Prince of Pontecorvo
- Born: 3 May 1973 (age 53); Neuilly-sur-Seine, France
- Spouse: Yasmine Lorraine Briki (m. 2021)
- Issue: Joachim Georges Laurent Napoléon
Names
- Joachim Charles Napoléon
- House: Murat
- Father: Joachim, 8th Prince Murat
- Mother: Laurence Marie Gabrielle Mouton

Forcari, Christophe (26 August 2020). "Joachim Murat, la tête sur les épaulettes". Libération (in French).

Joachim Charles Napoléon Murat, Prince of Pontecorvo (born 3 May 1973 in Neuilly-sur-Seine, France), is a French aristocrat and member of the Bonaparte-Murat family.

== Life and family ==
He is the second child and only son of Joachim, 8th Prince Murat, and of Laurence Marie Gabrielle Mouton. He uses the title of Prince of Pontecorvo, an unofficial title, and is the heir apparent to the title of Prince Murat.

He married civilly Yasmine Lorraine Briki on 5 March 2021 in Paris (10th arrondissement of Paris). On 3 August 2021 they had a son. He received the names of Joachim Georges Laurent Napoléon.

They married religiously on 22 October 2022 at the church of Les Invalides.

== See also ==
- House of Bonaparte
- Joachim Murat

French nobility of the First French Empire
Vacant Title last held by Joachim, 7th Prince Murat	Prince of Pontecorvo; 1973–present	Incumbent; Heir: Joachim Georges
