= Lily Pastré =

French heiress & philanthropist (1891-1974)

- Born: Marie-Louise Double de Saint-Lambert; 1891; Marseille
- Died: 1974 (aged 82–83); Marseille
- Occupation: Philanthropist
- Spouse: Jean Pastré (m. 1918; div. 1940)
- Children: Nadia Pastré; Princess Murat; Pierre Pastré
- Parent(s): Paul Double; Véra Magnan
- Relatives: Claudius Prat (paternal great-grandfather); Bernard Pierre Magnan (maternal great-grandfather); Joachim, 7th Prince Murat (son-in-law)

Countess Lily Pastré (a.k.a. Marie-Louise Double de Saint-Lambert) (1891–1974) was a French heiress and patron of the arts. She sheltered many Jewish artists in her Château Pastré in Marseille during World War II. After the war, she helped establish the Aix-en-Provence Festival, an annual opera festival in Aix-en-Provence.

== Biography ==
=== Early life ===
Marie-Louise Double de Saint-Lambert was born in 1891 at 167 rue Paradis in Marseille. Her father was Paul Double (1868-1935). Her paternal grandparents were Léon Double and Marie Prat (1849-1939), whose father, Claudius Prat (1814-1859), was the co-founder of Noilly Prat. She was thus an heiress to the Noilly Prat vermouth fortune. Her mother, Véra Magnan, was half Russian. Her maternal great-grandfather was Bernard Pierre Magnan, a Marshal of France. Beyond the Noilly Prat fortune, her family had become large landowners thanks to the dowry systems and good marriages. They were originally from Lyon before they moved to Marseille.

Lily grew up in Marseille. She was raised as a Roman Catholic. As a child, she was an avid tennis player and swimmer, and learned how to play the piano. One of her brothers, Maurice, was killed during the First World War in 1916.

=== Philanthropy ===
In the 1920s, she was a member of many society salons in Paris, including Marie-Blanche de Polignac's. It was there that she met many artists started supporting them, including Henri Sauguet. , Józef Czapski (a Polish painter and writer). She appeared in Man Ray's 1929 film set at the Villa Noailles, Les Mystères du Château de Dé. She also attended the opera festivals in Bayreuth and Salzburg.

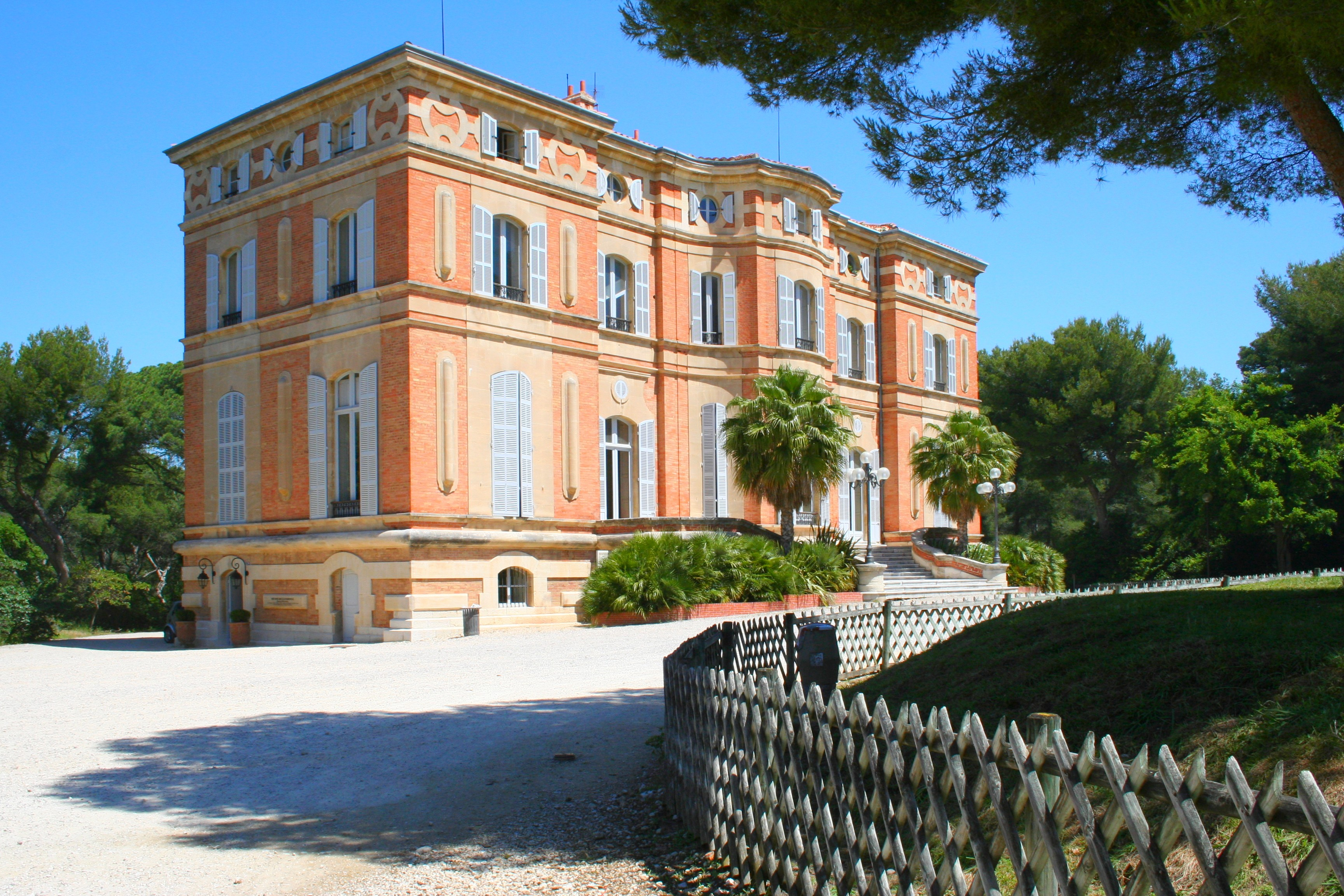
The Château Pastré, where the Countess sheltered Jewish artists during World War II and entertained.

In 1940, she established a philanthropic foundation to support the arts known as Pour que l’esprit vive (May the spirit live). In particular, it was meant to support struggling artists. It was headquartered on the Canebière.

During World War II, she sheltered Jewish artists in the Château Pastré, including the harpist Lily Laskine, the pianists Youra Guller and Monique Haas, the painter Rudolf Kundera, etc. She was also asked by her friend Édith Piaf to shelter her Jewish lover, Norbert Glanzberg, and she agreed to do so. Moreover, she arranged for the pianist Clara Haskil to receive medical care and then escape to Vevey, in Switzerland. She also hosted the cellist Pablo Casals, the dancer Josephine Baker, Samson François, Darius Milhaud, Georges Auric, André Masson, Paul Valéry, Lanza del Vasto, André Roussin, Victor Brauner, Luc Dietrich, Marcel Brion, Gérard Bauër, Raoul Dufy, etc. On July 29, 1942, A Midsummer Night's Dream by William Shakespeare was performed on the estate. The directors were Jean Walls and Boris Kochno, the costume designer was Christian Bérard, the composer was Jacques Ibert and the conductor was Manuel Rosenthal. Ninety percent of the orchestra were Jewish. The performance was covered by Le Figaro.

In 1948, she helped establish the Aix-en-Provence Festival, an annual opera festival in Aix-en-Provence, by covering the entire costs. She hired Hans Rosbaud as well as a German orchestra, even though it was only three years after the war. She also hired the pianists Clara Haskil and Jean Doyen, the soprano Maria Stader, and the Quartetto Italiano. However, by 1949, she stopped serving on the Board of Trustees of the festival, due to disagreements with the President of the festival, Gabriel Dussurget, who wanted the festival to become more professional.

She donated a parcel of land next to her Château Pastré to Emmaüs, a Catholic organization for the homeless.

=== Personal life ===
In 1918, she married Count Jean Pastré, an aristocrat and polo player who went on to play polo at the 1924 Summer Olympics. She received the title "Countess" via her marriage. They had three children: Nadia, Nicole and Pierre. They resided in Paris and summered at the Château Pastré in Marseille. They divorced in 1940, and she was given the château, keeping her aristocratic title.

=== Death ===
She died in 1974.

== Legacy ==
After her death, her son Pierre resided in the Château Pastré. He later donated it to the City of Marseille, where it became home to the Musée de la Faïence de Marseille.

Her daughter Nicole married Joachim, 7th Prince Murat and became known as Princess Murat.
