= Jean-Baptiste Pastré =

French banker and arms-dealer

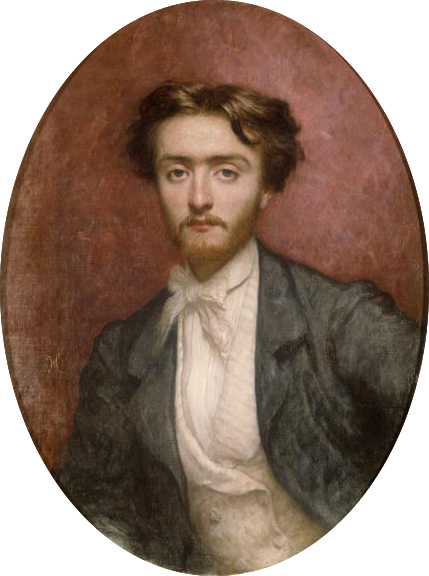
- Born: 10 October 1804; Marseille, France
- Died: 19 August 1877 (aged 72); Marseille, France
- Occupation(s): Banker, arms-dealer, politician
- Spouse: Marie-Thérèse Poncet
- Children: Marie Jeanne Faustine Pastré; Eugénie Pastré; Rose Pastré
- Parent(s): Jean-François Pastré; Marie-Eugénie Gauthier
- Relatives: Amélie Pastré (sister); Jean Joseph Pastré (brother); Eugène Pastré (brother); Jules Pastré, Prince d'Edde (brother)

Jean-Baptiste Pastré (10 October 1804 - 19 August 1877) was a French banker and arms-dealer from Marseille. A merchant banker in Egypt, he founded the Anglo-Egyptian Bank in 1862. He also served on the City Council of Marseille.

== Early life ==
Jean-Baptiste Pastré was born on 10 October 1804 in Marseille. His father, Jean-François Pastré (1758-1821), was a banker. His mother was Marie-Eugénie Gauthier (1776-1862). He had a sister, Amélie Pastré (1800-1880), and three brothers: Jean Joseph Pastré (1801-1861), Eugène Pastré (1806–1868) and Jules Pastré, Prince d'Edde (1810-1902).

== Career ==
Pastré became a prominent businessman and banker in Marseille. He was also an arms-dealer. For example, he sold weapons to the French Army during the Crimean War of 1853–1856. Moreover, in the 1850s, he served on the Boards of Directors of Arnaud Touache et Cie, later known as the Compagnie de navigation mixte, and Messageries Maritimes, both merchant shipping companies.

Thanks to his mother's friendship with Muhammad Ali of Egypt, Pastré went to Egypt to do business at the age of nineteen. As a result, he established a financial institution in Egypt as early as 1825. From the 1840s to the 1860s, he was one of the main French merchant bankers investing in Egypt, alongside Delort de Gléon and Edouard Dervieu (1824-1905). In 1862, he founded the Anglo-Egyptian Bank.

Back in Marseille, Pastré served as the first Chairman of the Société Marseillaise de Crédit. He also served as the first Vice President of the Compagnie des Docks et Entrepôts de Marseille, which he co-founded. Additionally, he served as a member of the Chamber of Commerce of Marseille from 1836 to 1842, from 1845 to 1849, and as its chairman from 1852 to 1866. In this capacity, he described Marseille as the meeting place between the West and the East, with the Mediterranean Sea as the place where peace must be forged. He also served as a city councillor of Marseille.

== Personal life ==
Pastré married Marie-Thérèse Poncet (1821-1879) on 15 February 1841. They had three children:

- Marie Jeanne Faustine Pastré (1841-1919).
- Eugénie Pastré (1843-unknown).
- Rose Pastré (1847-1892).

They resided at 57 Rue Saint-Ferréol in Marseille.

== Death ==
Pastré died on 19 August 1877 in Marseille.
