= Norbert Glanzberg =

French composer (1910–2001)

- Born: 12 October 1910; Rohatyn, Austria-Hungary (now Ukraine)
- Died: 25 February 2001 (aged 90) Paris, France
- Genres: Popular songs, Film Scores, Classical
- Occupations: Songwriter, composer, lyricist
- Years active: 1930–1985

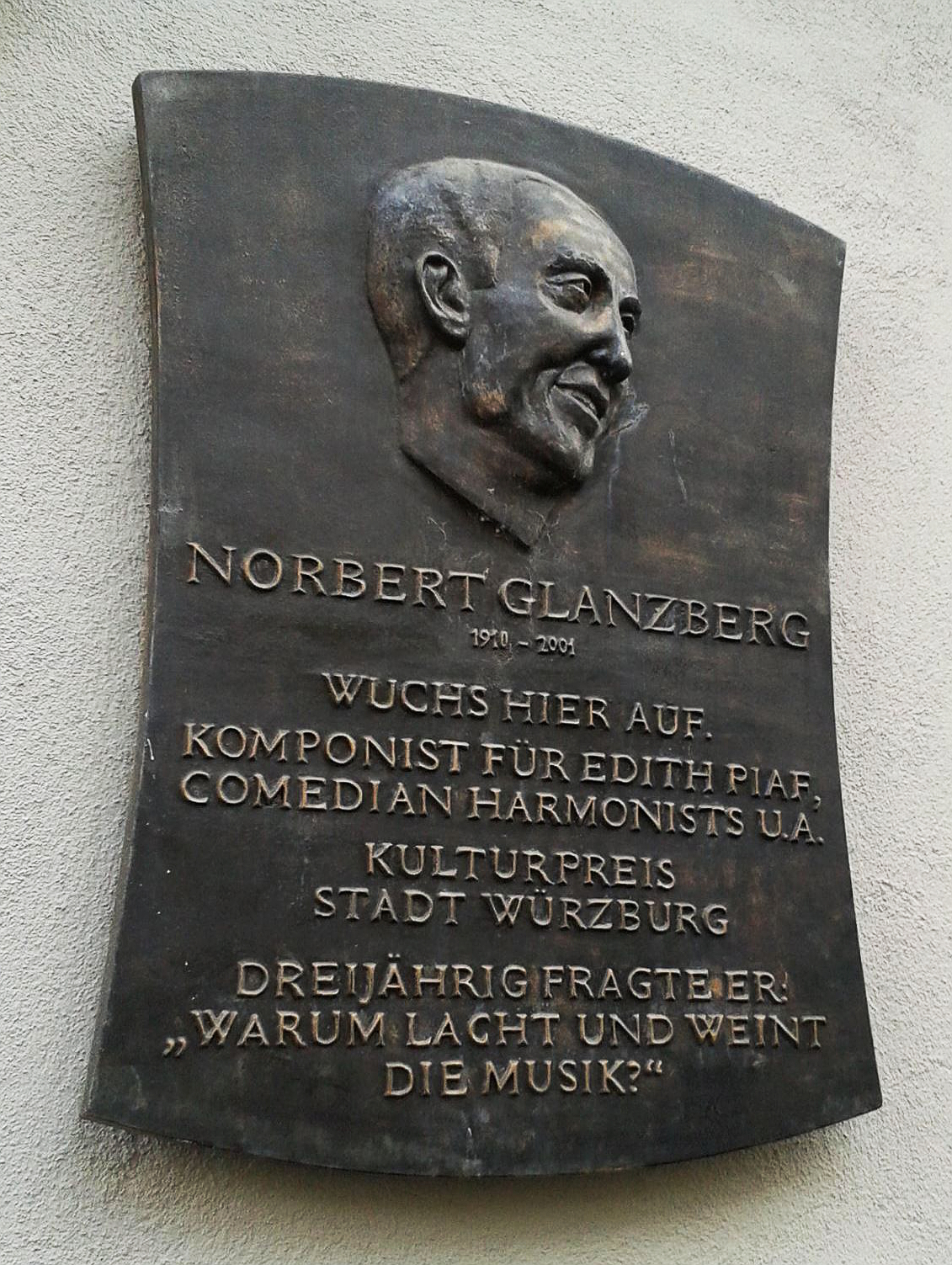
Würzburg plaque, Norbert Glanzberg, Wolfhartsgasse 6, Würzburg, Germany

Norbert Glanzberg (né Nathan Glanzberg; 12 October 1910 – 25 February 2001) was a Galician-born French composer. Mostly a composer of film music and songs, he was also notable for some famous songs of Édith Piaf.

In his twenties he lived in Germany, where he began his career scoring films for directors including Billy Wilder and Max Ophüls. When the Nazi regime came to power there in 1933, he, as a Jew, fled to Paris, where he performed in nightclubs under bandleaders such as Django Reinhardt, which is where he first met Piaf.

At different times from 1939 to 1945 he toured with Piaf, when he wrote many of her songs and accompanied her on piano when she sang. For many of those years they were lovers, and Piaf saved his life on more than one occasion by hiding him from both the French Vichy police, who were helping the Nazis round up Jews for deportation, and later from the Nazi occupiers themselves.

After the war he continued writing film scores for French films along with composing classical music, which included works and songs from Berlin and romantic classics. At the end of his career he wrote a concerto for two pianos in 1985 which was inspired by the novels of Isaac Bashevis Singer.

== Early years ==
Norbert Glanzberg was born from Jewish parents in Rohatyn in Galicia in the dual Austro-Hungarian Royal and Imperial Monarchy. His original name was Nathan, changed to Norbert when he arrived in Germany.

In 1911, his family moved to Würzburg in Bavaria, where Norbert received his first harmonica from his mother, which gave rise to the question: "Why does music laugh, why does music cry?" He entered the Conservatory of Würzburg in 1922, already a passionate, and he was appointed as assistant conductor of Aix-la-Chapelle in 1929, where he would meet Béla Bartók and Alban Berg.

== Career ==
Hired by the UFA (Universum Film AG) as a composer in 1930, 21-year-old Glanzberg wrote a film scores for Billy Wilder's German comedy The Wrong Husband and for Max Ophüls' comedy Cod Liver Oil is Preferred. He also wrote scores for opera music and was musical director for concerts in 1930, including ones by dancer Ellen Von Frankenberg. When the Nazi regime came into power in Germany in 1933, Joseph Goebbels referred to Glanzberg in the NSDAP newspaper, Der Angriff, as a degenerate Jewish artist. Glanzberg then went into exile in Paris.

In 1935 he met another exile in Paris, guitarist and bandleader Django Reinhardt, and became his pianist when his band played in Paris clubs. They played the evening that Edith Piaf first performed in front of an audience, after the club's manager heard her singing in the street and persuaded her to perform on stage. Piaf's powerful voice made an impression on Glanzberg, writes biographer Carolyn Burke.

He performed and composed songs in music-halls in Paris in the years before the war. In 1938, he met French singer Lily Gauty, and wrote Le bonheur est entré dans mon cœur (Happiness has entered my heart) for her. He also accompanied singers performing in fashion collections shows.

=== War years ===
In 1939, Glanzberg was enlisted into the Polish army, stationed in England. After he was discharged, he returned to France's Free Zone in the south of the country, which had not yet been occupied by Germany. There, he met the impresario Felix Marouani who hired him to tour with Piaf as her pianist. They began their tour in Lyon, France, within the Free Zone, in 1939. Along with being her pianist, he began writing some of her songs.

However, during 1939, Glanzberg's songwriting income was suddenly blocked by SACEM, France's professional songwriters and composers association, which disbursed funds to its members. The organization self-censored music composed by Jews to comply with Germany's Nuremberg Laws, aimed at undermining the income of Jews. As a result, writes Burke, "Edith became his lifeline."

on Padam...Padam, the musical

The “pampam” of the heartbeat of the little Polish Jew from Galicia would quickly turn into the “pampam” of a heart in anguish, forced to flee and lead a clandestine life, the arrests, the humiliation of forced anonymity, of false identities...
He often writes in dismal hovels while his melodies go off to tour the world. The greatest voices claim them...To play his music, to sing his songs, is to hear a voice sing out over the tumultuous winds of history, the voice of a man who, surrounded by the sounds of boots, was also able to hear the beating of a sentimental heart pulsing feverishly for the beautiful (and numerous!) faces of the women who crossed his path.
It was this that led to "Padam, Padam," which has become the international anthem of Paris and love. Without even realizing it, we all know this unknown celebrity.

— stage director Jean-Luc Tardieu

He and Piaf continued touring throughout France. But he always feared that his physical features might betray him to the French police or informers who had begun rounding up Jews and other undesirable refugees. They toured at various times between 1939 and 1942, and became lovers. His classical background and high standards led to Piaf's singing being greatly improved. They began to depend on each other, as he wrote some of her most successful songs and she gave him emotional support: "When Edith leaned on the piano," he recalled, "the better to create that intimacy that bound her to the music, to her music, I was seized by a mysterious, enchanting power."

Among the songs he wrote for her during her singing career were "Padam, padam..." "Mon Manege A Moi", "Il fait bon t'aimer" ("It's good loving you"). and "Au bal de la chance".

By 1942, the Vichy government in unoccupied France also began excluding Jews from most professions, which led to Glanzberg's name now being kept off of concert programs. He changed his name to Pierre Minet and relied on a fake French passport to travel around the country. Piaf became more concerned for his safety, once writing him when they were apart, "I'm worried about you. I drink only water and tea, go to bed at midnight...Everyone says I look well. It must be love!" She gave him the nickname "Nono chéri" ("darling Nono"), and wrote that he was her "seul amour," her only love. They were both unaware, as was most of France's population, that the Nazis planned to arrest some thirty thousand Parisian Jews, which they did two days after Bastille Day.

Piaf became increasingly aware that normal life in Paris was getting much worse. "I hope this abomination will come to an end soon," she wrote him. According to Burke, when Piaf and Glanzberg were apart, it was "only the thought of the songs that he was writing for her that gave her any pleasure." Then in 1943, when the Free Zone was also invaded, he was arrested as a Jew and placed in jail for three months. Actress Marie Bell and Corsican singer Tino Rossi, with Piaf's financial help, organized his successful escape just before he was to be deported to a concentration camp.

He moved to Marseille, but there the Germans were conducting daily searches for Jews. Piaf then arranged for him to hide at a nearby farm that was owned by her secretary, Andrée Bigard. Bigard and his family had helped a number of Piaf's other Jewish friends, including film director Marcel Blistène, take shelter and thereby survive the war.

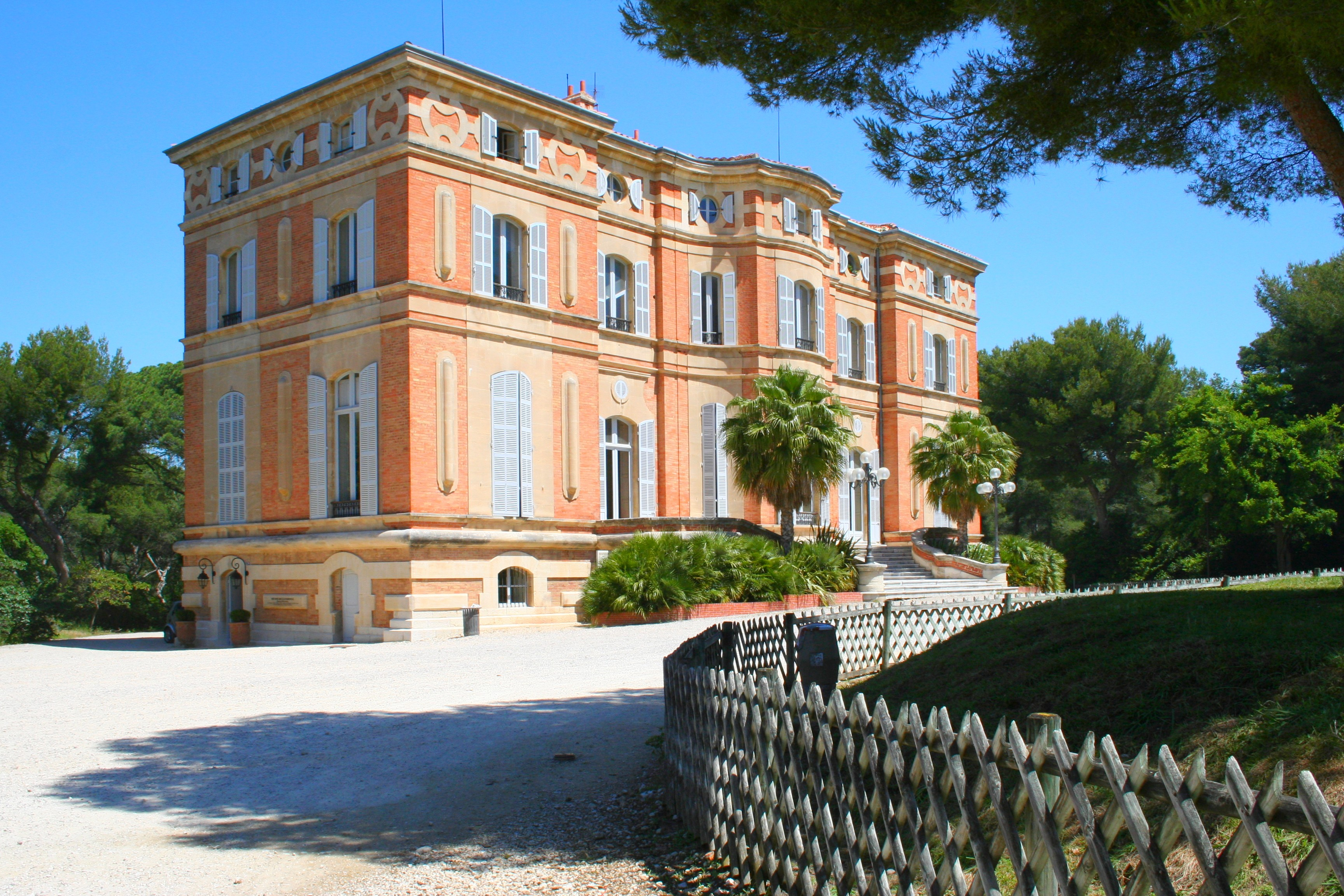
Château Pastré, Montredon

When the farm itself became too dangerous, Piaf asked another friend, Countess Lily Pastré, to hide him at Montredon, her chateau outside of Marseille. Piaf paid her to keep him fed and protected. Countess Pastré was a music lover who had good relations with the authorities, as she often invited them to concerts at the chateau. After the war, it was learned that the countess had sheltered some forty other Jewish composers and musicians from the French police, including Clara Haskil.

The Germans eventually invaded that part of southern France, which led Glanzberg to flee to Nice, under the protection of Tino Rossi's Corsican relatives. Piaf continued to cover the cost of his support, and often sent her secretary, Bigard, to check on his welfare.

Until 1944, he was also hidden at various times by Georges Auric and finally by the poet René Laporte at Antibes, where he met some active in the French Resistance, such as Paul Éluard, Jacques Prévert, Louis Aragon, Elsa Triolet and entertainment publisher René Julliard. Glanzberg survived the war, although between 1942 and 1944, over 75,000 Jews in France were deported to death camps in Germany.

=== Post-war years ===
After the Liberation in 1945, Norbert was free again. He helped in the release of Maurice Chevalier, who was kept in custody by a resistance movement. From 1946 to 1948 he toured with Charles Trenet in South America, followed by an international tour with Tino Rossi.

In 1948, Édith Piaf sung Padam, padam..., a song he wrote with Henri Contet, and in 1952 Yves Montand performs Moi j’m’en fous and Les grands boulevards.

From 1953, Glanzberg composed many film scores, especially for Michel Strogoff with Curd Jürgens and, in 1954, for La Goualeuse. Édith Piaf made a huge success of his song Mon manège à moi.

In 1955, he composed the music for the film La sorcière, with Marina Vlady, and in 1956 the score for La mariée est trop belle (The Bride Is Much Too Beautiful), featuring Brigitte Bardot.

In 1959, Glanzberg's son Serge, now a producer in the music business, was born.

According to the biographical book "Chanson für Edith", the Petula Clark hit Chariot, later recorded as I Will Follow Him was actually written by Glanzberg and not, as often cited, by Franck Pourcel (and alleged co-composer Paul Mauriat), who actually only made the first recording of the song as an instrumental.

In 1983, Glanzberg went back to classical music and composed a series of lieder from a collection of poems written during the war by concentration camp inmates, La mort est un maître de l’Allemagne (der Tod ist ein ... Meister aus Deutschland), the chorus of what is perhaps the greatest poem by Paul Celan, Todesfuge (Death Fugue). He put into music, in two cycles each of ten works, songs from Berlin and romantic leader classics. In 1985, he wrote a concerto for two pianos, La suite yiddish, inspired from the novels of Isaac Bashevis Singer. This work would be arranged for a symphonic orchestra by his friend, the composer and conductor Frédéric Chaslin.

== Filmography ==
- 1931: The Wrong Husband
- 1931: On préfère l’huile de foie de morue (Dann schon lieber Lebertran)
- 1938: La Goualeuse
- 1948: Neuf garçons, un cœur
- 1948: Bichon
- 1949: Brilliant Waltz
- 1951: Les deux Monsieur de madame
- 1952: Le costaud des Batignolles
- 1952: It Happened in Paris
- 1953: Double or Quits
- 1953: My Brother from Senegal
- 1953: On ne chasse pas sans son chien
- 1954: La rage au corps
- 1954: Ma petite folie (My Little Madness)
- 1954: The Pirates of the Bois de Boulogne
- 1955: Blackmail
- 1955: La lumière d’en face
- 1956: La sorcière (The Blonde Witch)
- 1956: Quand vient l’amour
- 1956: The Bride Is Much Too Beautiful
- 1956: Michel Strogoff
- 1958: Mon oncle
- 1958: La moucharde
- 1959: Les bateliers de la Volga (I Battellieri del Volga)
- 1960: La Française et l’amour (Love and the Frenchwoman) (segment "Adultery")
- 1962: La marine à travers les âges
- 1963: Une blonde comme ça
- 1963: Janique aimée
- 1968: Le bal des voyous

== Compositions ==
- Der Tod ist ein Meister aus Deutschland: anthology of poems from victims of Nazism (title taken from a line of the poem by Paul Celan: Todesfuge)
- Holocaust Lieder: 9 Lieder for baritone and piano (1983) on poems inspired by the concentration camps.

Given in concert in Würzburg with Hanna Schygulla in 1998

- Transport (Gerry Spies)
- Ausflug machen (Rainer Kirsch)
- Die letzte (Gerson Stern)
- Ein Koffer spricht (Ilse Weber)
- Der Gute Ort zu Wien (Franz Werfel)
- Ballade von der Judenhure (Berthold Brecht)
- Holocaust Songs: 11 songs for mezzo-soprano and piano or orchestra (1984)
- Concerto for two pianos (1985)

== Selected recordings ==
- Glanzberg: In Memoriam – Lieder & Chamber Music : Invitation à la valse In Memoriam Suite Yiddish original piano versions – Markus Bellheim (piano), Heinrich Martin (piano), Jakob Johannes Koch (baritone) Castigo Classics
- Glanzberg Holocaust Lieder & Suite Yiddish – Spngs and Suite Yiddish for two clarinets, in orchestrated versions by Frédéric Chaslin and Daniel Klajner. Roman Trekel (baritone) Orchestre symphonique de Mulhouse, Daniel Klajner MDG
- "Padam padam", song Anne Sofie von Otter (mezzo soprano), Bengt Forsberg (piano) on Douce France recital

== Bibliography ==
- Astrid Freyeisen: Songs for Piaf: Norbert Glanzberg (Chanson pour Edith Piaf: Norbert Glanzberg, toute une vie, 1910–2001), Geneva, MJR, 2006, (ISBN 978-2883210424)
