= Joachim, 8th Prince Murat =

Member of the Bonaparte-Murat family

Joachim de Murat
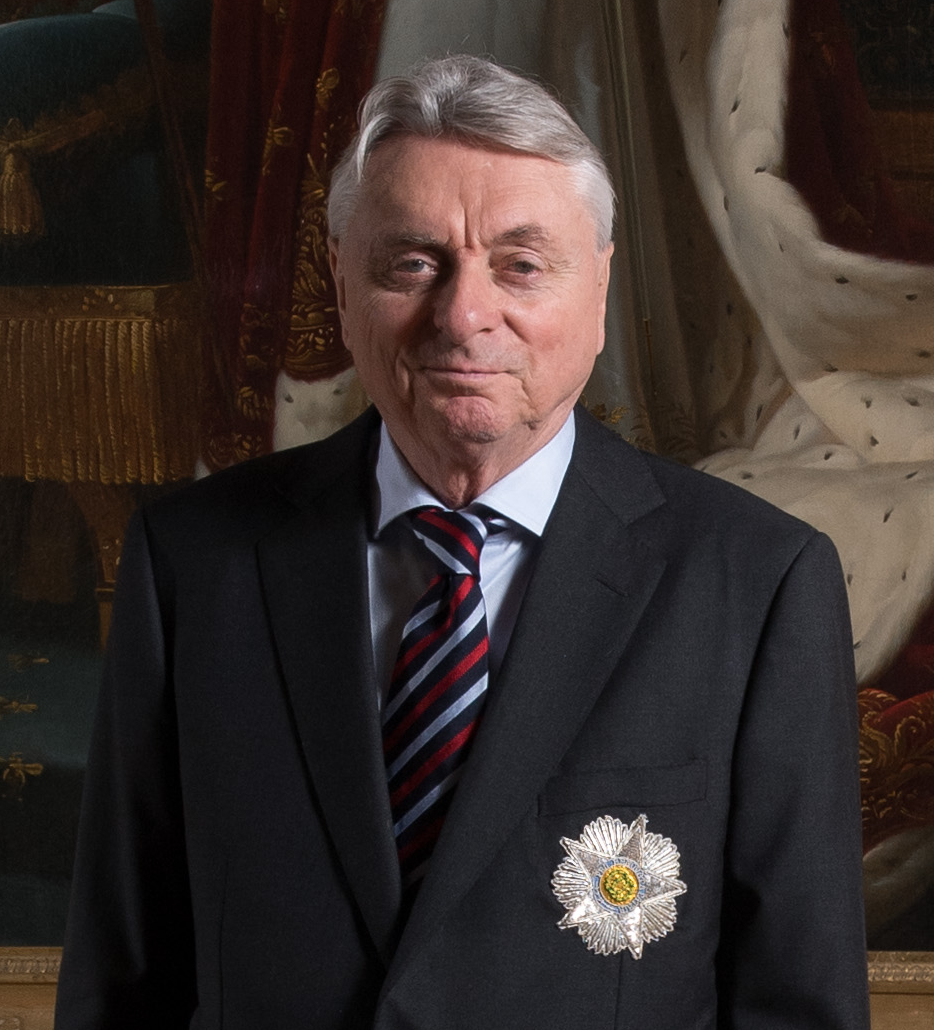
- Murat in 2017

Prince Murat
- Tenure: 26 November 1944 – present
- Predecessor: Joachim, 7th Prince Murat
- Born: 26 November 1944 (age 81); Boulogne-Billancourt, Hauts-de-Seine, France
- Spouse: Laurence Marie Gabrielle Mouton (m. 1969, divorced) Maria del Pilar Arnao Cacho (m. 2015)
- Issue: Princess Caroline; Joachim, Prince of Pontecorvo; Princess Laetitia; Princess Élisa; Princess Pauline
- House: Murat
- Father: Joachim, 7th Prince Murat
- Mother: Nicole Véra Claire Hélène Pastré

Joachim Louis Napoléon de Murat, 8th Prince Murat (born 26 November 1944) is the current head of the House of Murat, a cadet branch of the House of Bonaparte. He is an important figure in Napoleonic circles and is very much involved in the commemoration of Imperial memory. A long time collector of art, he was also the owner and founder of the Museum and Center of Contemporary Art Prince Murat of Nointel (1982–1987).

== Family ==
The sixth generation descendant of Joachim Murat (1767–1815), Grand Duke of Berg and King of Naples, and his wife Caroline Bonaparte (1782–1839), Joachim Murat is the posthumous son of Joachim Murat (1920–1944), 7th Prince Murat, and Nicole Véra Claire Hélène Pastré (1921–1982).

== Biography ==
The posthumous and only son of Joachim, 7th Prince Murat, Prince Murat married Laurence Marie Gabrielle Mouton on 11 October 1969 in Paris. They have five children:

- Princess Caroline Laetizia Victoire Alix Murat (born 31 October 1971, Neuilly-sur-Seine).
- Prince Joachim Charles Napoléon Murat, Prince of Pontecorvo (born 3 May 1973, in Neuilly-sur-Seine) – heir apparent to his father, who married Yasmine Lorraine Briki on 5 March 2021 in Paris.
- Princess Laetitia Caroline Marie Pierre Murat (born 27 August 1975, Neuilly-sur-Seine).
- Princess Élisa Marie Annonciade Murat (born 16 February 1977, Neuilly-sur-Seine) – twin with Princess Pauline.
- Princess Pauline Béatrice Marie Murat (born 16 February 1977, Neuilly-sur-Seine) – twin with Princess Élisa.

On March 25, 2017, the anniversary of the birth of his ancestor King Joachim Murat, Prince Murat reestablished the old Royal Order of the Two Sicilies, founded by the aforementioned monarch, as a dynastic family order with him as Grand Master, and members awarded in two classes, Knight and Commander. This revived Order has not been recognized by the International Commission on Orders of Chivalry, which is a private institution dealing with Orders of Chivalry.

French nobility of the First French Empire
Vacant Title last held by Joachim, 7th Prince Murat	Prince Murat; 1944–present	Incumbent; Heir: Joachim, Prince of Pontecorvo
