= Mahmudiyya Canal =

Sub-canal from the Nile to the Mediterranean Sea

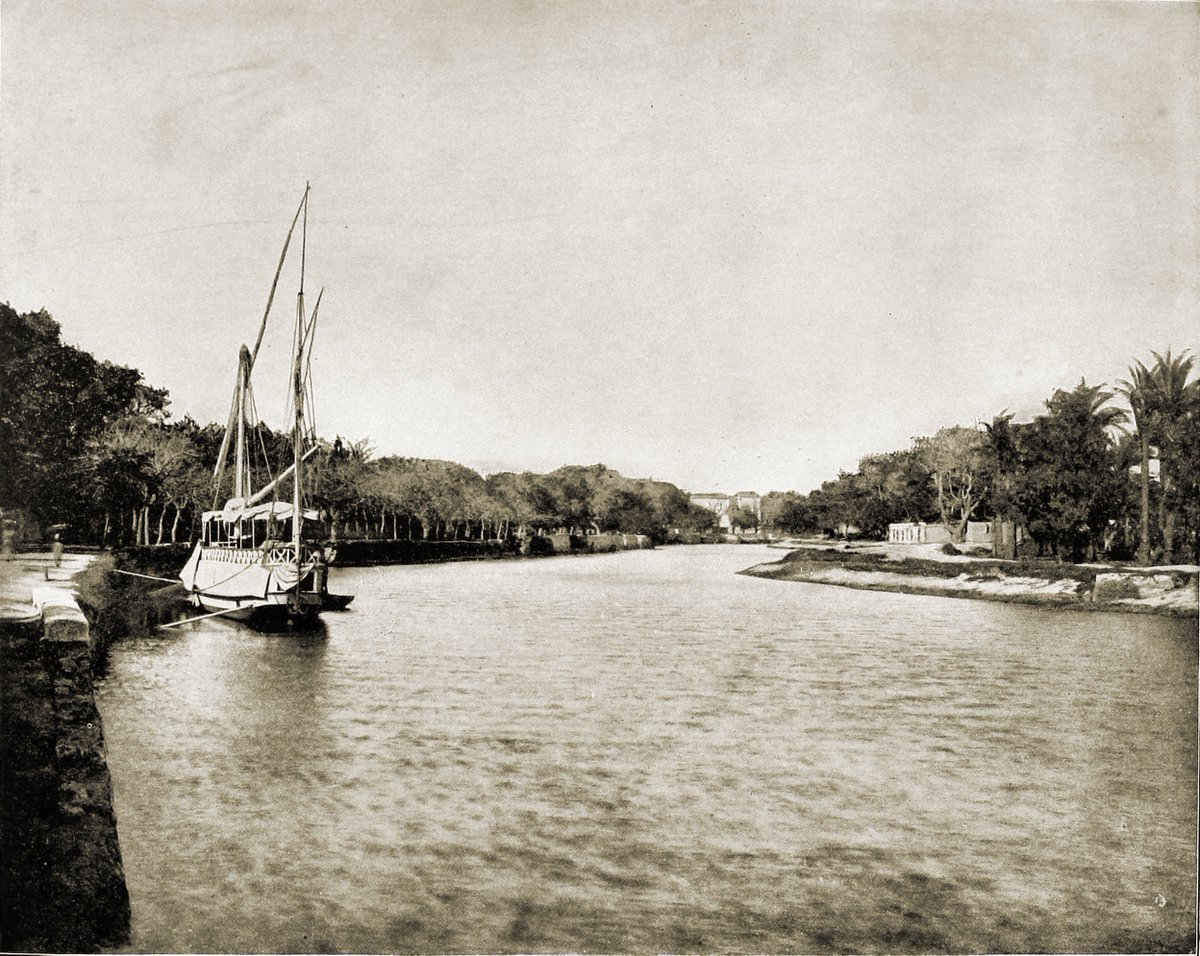
The Mahmoudiyah Canal in 1893

Maḥmūdiyya Canal (Greek: Ἀγαθὸς Δαίμων Agathos Daimon or Greek: Μέγας ποταμός Megas potamos) is a 45-mile-long (72 km) sub-canal from the Nile River which starts at the Nile-port of Mahmoudia and goes through Alexandria to the Mediterranean Sea. It was built to supply Alexandria with food and fresh water from the Nile.

== History ==
=== Prior to 1817 ===
The first freshwater canal from the Nile to Alexandria was built under the rule of Ptolemy I. Ibn Batuta (1304–1369), the Moroccan traveller, in his "Rihla: My Travels", discusses passing through Alexandria in 1326 and references a canal from Alexandria to The Nile that was finished a few years before his arrival. This might contradict with Wali Muhammad Ali building it almost four centuries later. However, regarding the geographic location and the fact that this part of the land, which has been reclaimed not a long time ago, was plain desert then, the canal might have been covered in sand sometime before it was re-established, not necessarily following the same route, by Muhammed Ali of Egypt.

=== The digging process ===
On 8 May 1817, Viceroy Mohamed Ali ordered a canal to be dug from the Nile River close to Alatf village to deliver the water of the Nile to Alexandria through Beheira and to be a path for cargo ships. He ordered to group workers and tools necessary to start the digging work. During the digging process, some old houses covered in sand were found which had ancient boxes inside; some of them were opened and some others were sent to Mohamed Ali without their content being known. In April 1819 the work stopped due to plague. In January 1820, the canal was completed and named after Sultan Mahmud II, the Sultan of Istanbul, as Egypt was an Ottoman province at that time.

=== After 1820 ===
Within twenty years after the canal was dug, it filled with sand and became almost impassable, and it was only after Muhammad Sa'id Pasha came to power that it was cleared and made navigable again.

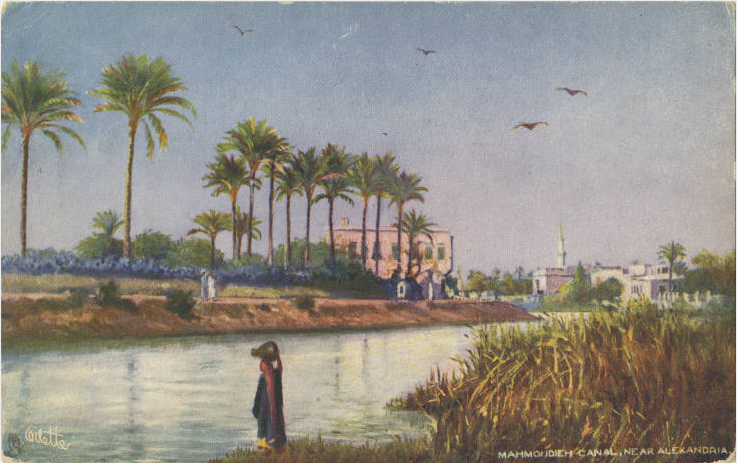
Postcard showing the Mahmoudiyah Canal

A contract between the Prussian Baron de Pentz and the Pasha to use the canal for the provisioning of Alexandria in the first half of the nineteenth century came to an end due to a disagreement over the hoisting of a Prussian flag. In the 1850s, a new steam-tug company was formed with approval from the pasha to use the canal. Its board of directors included Jules Pastré, Alexander G. Cassavetti, Ange Adolphe Levi, Alexander Tod, and Moise Valensin. The pasha ordered the new company to replace the old locks with newer, bigger gates and to provide for the cleaning and upkeep of the canal.

== Map from the time of construction ==
In the French Carte Topographique de l'Egypte, investigated while the canal was built, and published in 1818, the canal is called Canal of Alexandria (خليج الإسكندرية — Khalīg al-Iskandariyya). In that map the bifurcation from the Nile is 20 upstream of the modern bifurcation and yet there are no totally straight sections.

== Crime in the Mahmudiyya ==
Due to its vastness and proximity to the city center of Alexandria, the Mahmudiyya Canal became a popular place for murderers to dispose of bodies. In 1904, it was reported in the Egyptian Gazette that an Egyptian woman had been brutally murdered by a butcher and shoemaker, who disposed of her body in the canal. Two years later in 1906, it was reported that the remains of a young Egyptian girl were discovered in a large canvas bag, by a fisherman, along the canal.

== See also ==
- Suez Canal
- Ibrahimiya Canal
