= Jules Pastré =

French banker, businessman and equestrian

- Born: Pierre Jules; 12 April 1809; Marseille, France
- Died: 21 May 1899 (aged 90); Paris, France
- Occupations: Banker, businessman, equestrian
- Spouse: Betzi Schutz
- Children: Pierre Pastré; Berthe Pastré; Thérèse Pastré; Christine Pastré
- Relatives: Amélie Pastré (sister); Jean Joseph Pastré (brother); Jean-Baptiste Pastré (brother); Eugène Pastré (brother)

Jules Pastré (12 April 1809 – 21 May 1899) was a French banker, businessman and equestrian. He was a board member of the Anglo-Egyptian Bank and co-founder of Eaux du Caire, a water distribution company in Cairo.

== Biography ==
=== Early life ===
Jules Pastré was born on 12 April 1809, in Marseille. His father, Jean-François Pastré (1758–1821), was a tanner and a shipowner. His mother was Eugénie Pastré (1776–1862). He had a sister, Amélie Pastré (1800–1880), and three brothers: Jean Joseph Pastré (1801–1861), Jean-Baptiste Pastré (1804–1877), and Eugène Pastré (1806–1868).

=== Career ===
Pastré became in Egypt, where he joined his brother Jean-Baptiste. In 1843, Jules was appointed as one of seven intendent within the Egyptian Health Department to oversee how it was run. In 1865, with Nubar Pasha, he co-founded Eaux du Caire, a water distribution company in Cairo.

In the 1850s, Pastré served on the Board of Directors of a steam-tug company active on the Mahmoudiyah Canal for the first time since the contract between Prussian Baron de Pentz and the Pasha came to an end due to a disagreement. Other Board members included Alexander G. Cassavetti, Ange Adolphe Levi, Alexander Tod, and Moise Valensin. Pastré also served on the Board of Directors of Compagnie Medjidié, a steam shipping company meant to connect all harbours of the Red Sea. The company was founded by Mustapha Bey and co-chaired by Abdallah Bey. Other Board directors included Messrs. de Dumreicher, Hassan Kamil Bey, Ismail Fevzi Bey, Ange Adolphe Levi, Moukhtar Bey, S. W. Ruyssenaers, Said Effendi, Hugh Thurburn, and N. Zaccali.

As a banker, he served on the board of directors of the Anglo-Egyptian Bank. Other board members included his brother Jean-Baptiste Pastré, George Gordon Macpherson, Samuel Laing, Edward Masterman, Alfred Devaux, and Giovanni Sinadino. Later, Samuel Laing was replaced by Robert Edmund Morrice. In Random variables, Nathaniel de Rothschild explains that shortly after British Prime Minister Benjamin Disraeli decided to no longer support Khedivate of Egypt, Pastré failed to "float a loan" in 1873.

=== Equestrianism ===
He competed in race horses alongside Ferdinand de Lesseps.

=== Personal life ===
He married Elisabeth Nancy Schutz in 1835. They had four children:

- Pierre Pastré.
- Berthe Pastré.
- Thérèse Pastré.
- Christine Pastré.

=== Death ===
He died on 21 May 1899 in Paris, at 51 avenue Montaigne (8e).
