= Gabriel Dussurget =

French impresario and opera director

- Born: 1 January 1904; Aïn M'lila, French Algeria
- Died: 28 July 1996; Paris, France
- Occupation(s): Opera founder, artistic director, impresario

Gabriel Dussurget (1 January 1904 – 28 July 1996) was a French impresario and opera director. He was the co-founder of the Aix-en-Provence Festival, an annual summer opera festival in Aix-en-Provence, and served as its artistic director from 1948 to 1973. He also served as the artistic director of the Paris Opera from 1959 to 1972. He became known as the "Magician of Aix" for his work at the opera festival

== Biography ==
=== Early life ===
Gabriel Dussurget was born on 1 January 1904 in Aïn M'lila near Biskra in French Algeria. He attended public schools in Constantine and learned to play the piano. He moved to France with his parents shortly after World War I to receive treatment for malaria. He passed his baccalauréat in Paris.

=== Career ===
He worked as a dancer in Paris in the 1930s. During World War II, he founded a drama school in Paris with his partner, Henri Lambert. His students included Jean-Louis Barrault, Ginette Neveu, Madeleine Renaud, Yvonne Loriod, Olivier Messiaen, and Raymond Rouleau. In 1945, shortly after the war, he established Les Ballets des Champs-Elysées, a Paris-based ballet company, with Roland Petit and Boris Kochno.

A few years later, in 1948, he co-founded the Aix-en-Provence Festival with Countess Lily Pastré and businessman Roger Bigonnet, director of the casino in Aix. Countess Pastré stepped out of the board of trustees in 1949, when Dussurget wanted the festival to become more "professional." Over the years, he hired opera singers Teresa Berganza, Gabriel Bacquier, Renato Capecchi, Roger Soyer, Graziella Schiutti, José Van Dam, Marcello Cortis, Teresa Stich-Randall and orchestra directors Hans Rosbaud, Lorin Maazel, all of whom went on to have global careers. He served as director of the Aix Festival until 1973. As a result, he became known as the "Magician of Aix." In 1986, a documentary about his life, Le Magicien d'Aix, directed by Pierre Jourdan, was released.

From 1959 to 1972 he also served as artistic director of the Paris Opera. He retired in Paris in 1973, where he mentored young artists. For example, he "discovered" Roberto Alagna.

=== Personal life ===
He was a homosexual. His first relationship was with Maurice Escande of the Comédie-Française. In 1928, he became the life partner of Henri Lambert, a wealthy antiques dealer. They resided in Paris and owned a house in Venice from 1928 to 1938. Henri Lambert died in 1959.

== Legacy ==
- His bust was dedicated inside the Cite du Livre in Aix-en-Provence in 2006.
- The Prix Gabriel Dussurget is an annual award given to a promising opera singer during the Aix-en-Provence Festival. In 2014, it was awarded to Mari Eriksmoen.
- In 2014, the Rue Gabriel Dussurget was named in his honour in Aix-en-Provence.
- The Association Gabriel Dussurget is a non-profit organizations in his honour.
