= Avensac =

- Commune
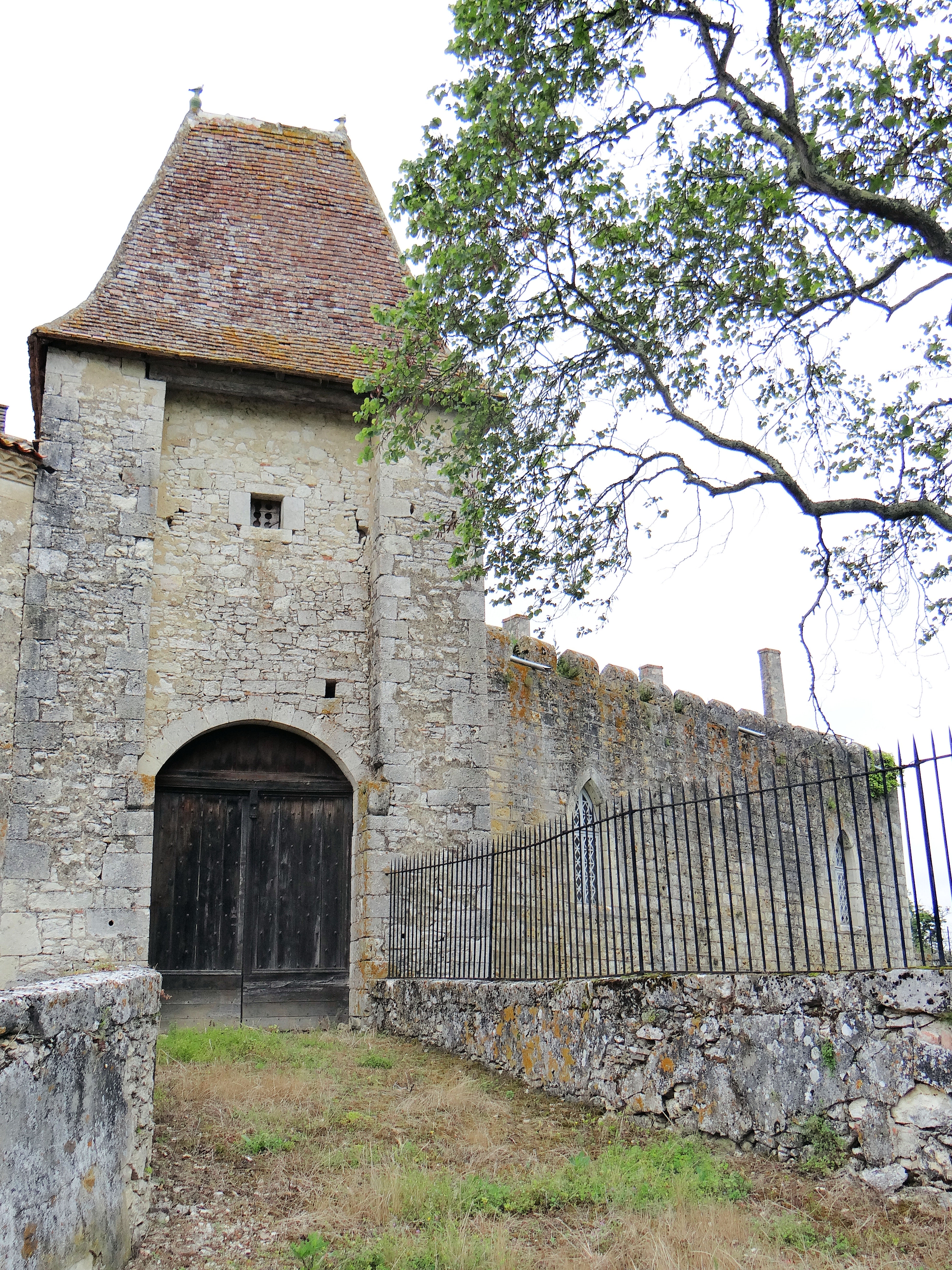
- The castle in Avensac
- Location of Avensac
- Location within France Location within Occitanie
- Coordinates: 43°49′57″N 0°54′11″E
- Country: France
- Region: Occitania
- Department: Gers
- Arrondissement: Condom
- Canton: Gimone-Arrats
- Intercommunality: CC Bastides Lomagne

Government
  - Mayor (2020–2026): Michel Tarrible
- Area^{1}: 4.8 km^{2} (1.9 sq mi)
- Elevation: 201 m (659 ft)
- Highest elevation: 207 m (679 ft)
- Lowest elevation: 111 m (364 ft)
- Population (2023): 73
  - Density: 15/km^{2} (39/sq mi)
- Time zone: UTC+01:00 (CET)
  - Summer (DST): UTC+02:00 (CEST)
- INSEE/Postal code: 32021 /32120
- ^{1} French Land Register data, which excludes lakes, ponds, glaciers > 1 km^{2} (0.386 sq mi or 247 acres) and river estuaries.

Avensac is a commune in the Gers department in southwestern France.

== Geography ==
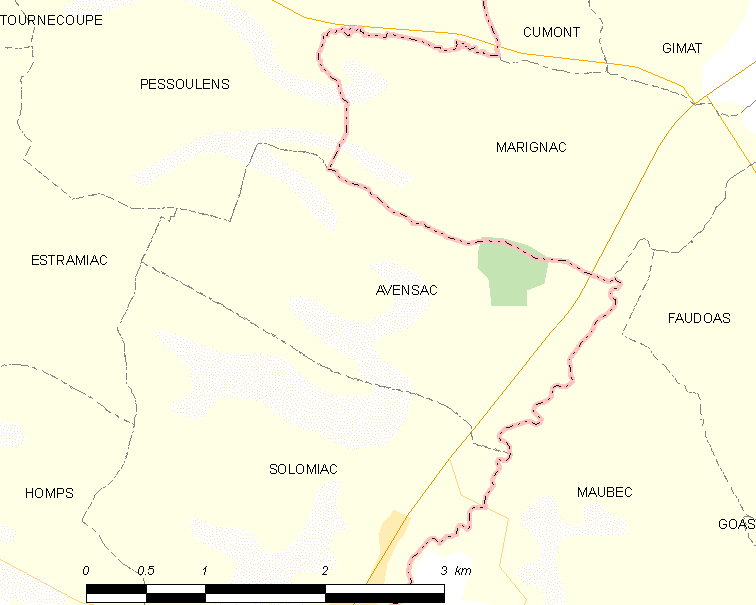
Avensac and its surrounding communes

== Population ==
Historical population
Year	Pop.	±% p.a.
1968	98	—
1975	78	−3.21%
1982	62	−3.23%
1990	43	−4.47%
1999	48	+1.23%
2007	58	+2.39%
2012	65	+2.31%
2017	77	+3.45%
2023	73	−0.89%
Source: INSEE

== See also ==
- Communes of the Gers department
