= Ulysse Pastre =

French politician (1864–1930)

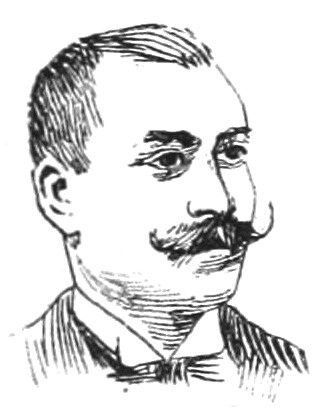

Ulysse Pastre (19 January 1864 – 29 January 1930) was a French politician.

Pastre was born in Gallargues-le-Montueux. At first, he joined the French Workers' Party (POF), which in 1902 merged into the Socialist Party of France (PSdF), which in turn merged into the French Section of the Workers' International (SFIO) in 1905. Pastre was a member of the Chamber of Deputies from 1898 to 1910.
