= El Mahmoudiyah =

El Mahmoudia المحمودية
- Town
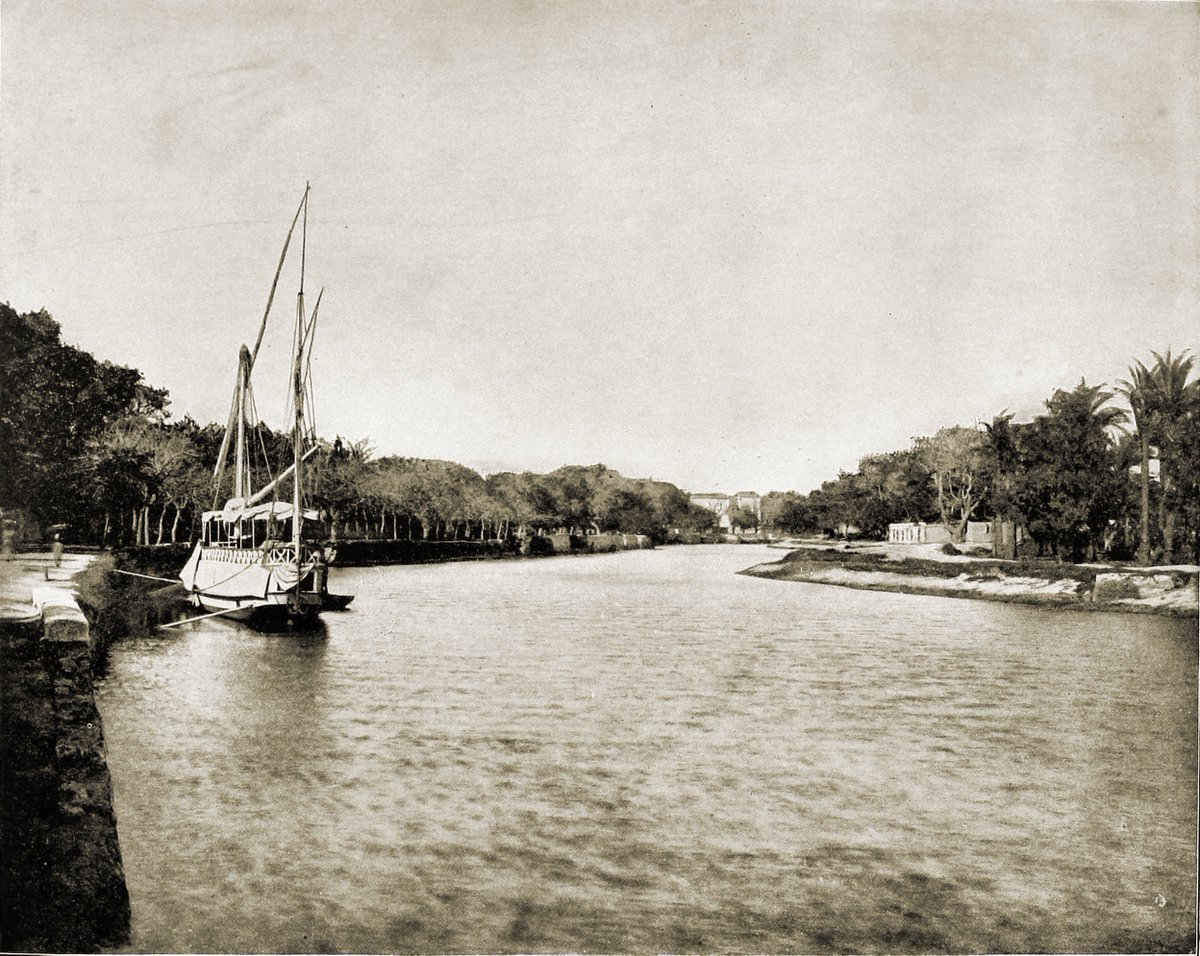
- Mahmoudiyan Canal

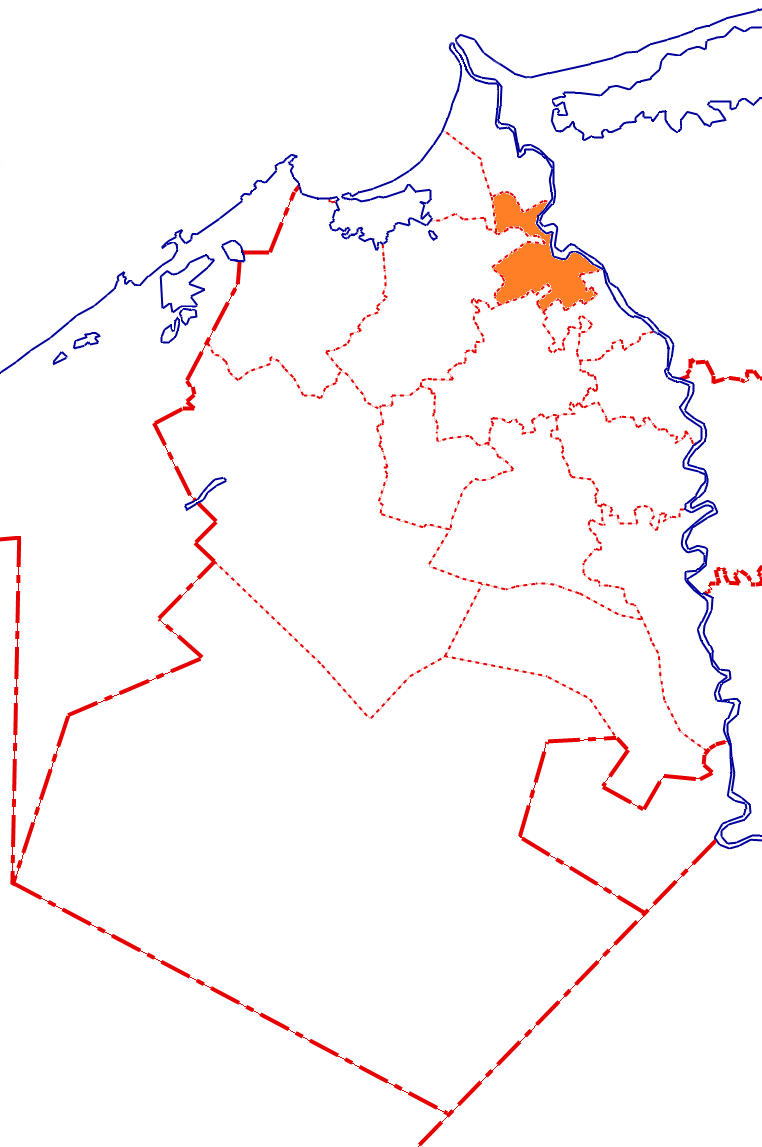
- Location in Beheira Governorate

- Location in Egypt El Mahmoudia (Egypt)
- Coordinates: 31°11′2″N 30°31′27″E
- Country: Egypt
- Governorate: Beheira

Area
  - Total: 2.74 km^{2} (1.06 sq mi)

Population (2023)
  - Total: 35,898
  - Density: 13,100/km^{2} (33,900/sq mi)
- Time zone: UTC+2 (EET)
  - Summer (DST): UTC+3 (EEST)

El Mahmoudia (Arabic: المحمودية, IPA: [elmæħmoˈdejjæ]) is an Egyptian city on the connection point between the Nile and Mahmoudiyah canal. It was historically one of the most important trade ports on the Nile River. Trading ships traveling from Upper Egypt and Lower Egypt to Alexandria passed through its lock and up the Mahmoudiyah Canal. Trading ships from Alexandria also carried imported merchandise to Cairo through the port.

== Special location ==
The city's special location made it a major trade center in the region. As ships stopped in its natural mooring in the Nile the city had a major activity in markets.

== History ==
Mahmoudiyah was built over Al-Atf (Arabic: العطف) village, which was called Balhib (Coptic: ⲡⲉⲗϩⲓⲡ, Arabic: بلهيب) in Middle Ages, and it was a police station belonging to the Rashid Center. It is distinguished by its great mosque that was built during the reign of Muhammad Ali. It was named after Mahmoudiyah after Ottoman Sultan Mahmud II in Istanbul. Egypt was a vassal of the Ottoman Empire, during which time Muhammad Ali Pasha was the governor of Egypt.

Its name is associated with the name of a nearby canal, and the city is characterized by a hydraulic system of locks, whose waters patch the boats from the Nile and lower them from the canal to the level of the Nile. The city is surrounded by water, especially in the south. It reaches from the Mahmudiyah Canal to the Rashidiyya Canal, which Is used to supply Rashid and Idku with water for drinking and irrigation.

=== Modern ===
The city of Mahmoudiya was occupied by garrisons, like other strategic cities during the First World War. The British garrison consisted of Indian, Irish, African and English soldiers. The city was a strategic site and target for the Germans in World War II.

Because the city is located at the mouth of the Mahmoudiyah Canal, it was considered a key naval transport route for goods and the British weaponry from Alexandria to Cairo to enter boats to the Nile.

In December 1916, local people of the city were celebrating the wedding of a couple, marching in a procession, carrying lamps and torches, and shouting. The city garrison's leader mistook this for a rebellion so ordered the garrison to attack the residents. This prompted fighting between the locals and the garrison, and culminated in a request from the garrison commander for the leaders of the city to negotiate with them. The mayor of the city, Darwish al-Wailili, headed a delegation and met with the garrison commander, requesting an apology to the people for the attack.

In the 1919 revolution, the people of Mahmudiya damaged the Delta Railroad tracks and set the main station on fire.

From July 11, 1942, and throughout World War II, Mahmoudiyah received thousands of displaced people fleeing bombing in Alexandria, Kafr el-Dawar, Khorshid, and al-Baida. The city provided shelter and food despite its own targeting in air raids. During World War II, the Al-Atf power station was used to generate electricity for Lower Egypt and the Ahmouda Canal canal, which connects drinking water to Alexandria, Abu Homs, and Kafr al-Dawwar, and was therefore a desirable target.

== Geography ==
River and sea-going craft along this coast are sometimes exposed to rough sea conditions. As a result, boats were often crowded along the canal opening by the intensity of the commercial traffic on the coast by the island of Ful Al-Madina. The city therefore promoted commercial and navigational agencies to govern water traffic, especially during the First and Second World Wars.

Mahmoudiyah Center was famous for the cultivation of rice and cotton transported through the Mahmoudiyah Canal to be exported to Europe. This city was one of the major commercial cities in Lower Egypt for its unique geographical location. The Nile to its north was as wide as a natural harbor, and to its east is the mouth of the Mahmoudiyah Canal. In addition, there is a pump station to raise the Nile water to the canal that supplies several cities in the West Delta, including Alexandria.

=== Climate ===
Köppen-Geiger climate classification system classifies its climate as hot desert (BWh), but due to its closeness to the northern coast of Egypt, its temperatures are moderated by the prevailing winds of the Mediterranean Sea.

Climate data for Mahmoudiyah
Month	Jan	Feb	Mar	Apr	May	Jun	Jul	Aug	Sep	Oct	Nov	Dec	Year
Mean daily maximum °C (°F)	17.1 (62.8)	18.1 (64.6)	20.9 (69.6)	24.7 (76.5)	28.5 (83.3)	30.3 (86.5)	31.4 (88.5)	31.8 (89.2)	30.1 (86.2)	28.5 (83.3)	24.4 (75.9)	19.5 (67.1)	25.4 (77.8)
Daily mean °C (°F)	12.2 (54.0)	12.8 (55.0)	15.2 (59.4)	18.4 (65.1)	22.1 (71.8)	24.5 (76.1)	26 (79)	26.3 (79.3)	24.6 (76.3)	22.9 (73.2)	19.2 (66.6)	14.4 (57.9)	19.9 (67.8)
Mean daily minimum °C (°F)	7.2 (45.0)	7.6 (45.7)	9.6 (49.3)	12.2 (54.0)	15.8 (60.4)	18.8 (65.8)	20.6 (69.1)	20.8 (69.4)	19.2 (66.6)	17.3 (63.1)	14 (57)	9.3 (48.7)	14.4 (57.8)
Average precipitation mm (inches)	35 (1.4)	25 (1.0)	10 (0.4)	4 (0.2)	3 (0.1)	0 (0)	0 (0)	0 (0)	0 (0)	7 (0.3)	15 (0.6)	29 (1.1)	128 (5.1)
Source: Climate-Data.org

== Notable people ==
- Hassan al-Banna

== See also ==
- Mahmoudiyah canal
