= Bernard Pierre Magnan =

French Marshal

Marshal of France Bernard Pierre Magnan
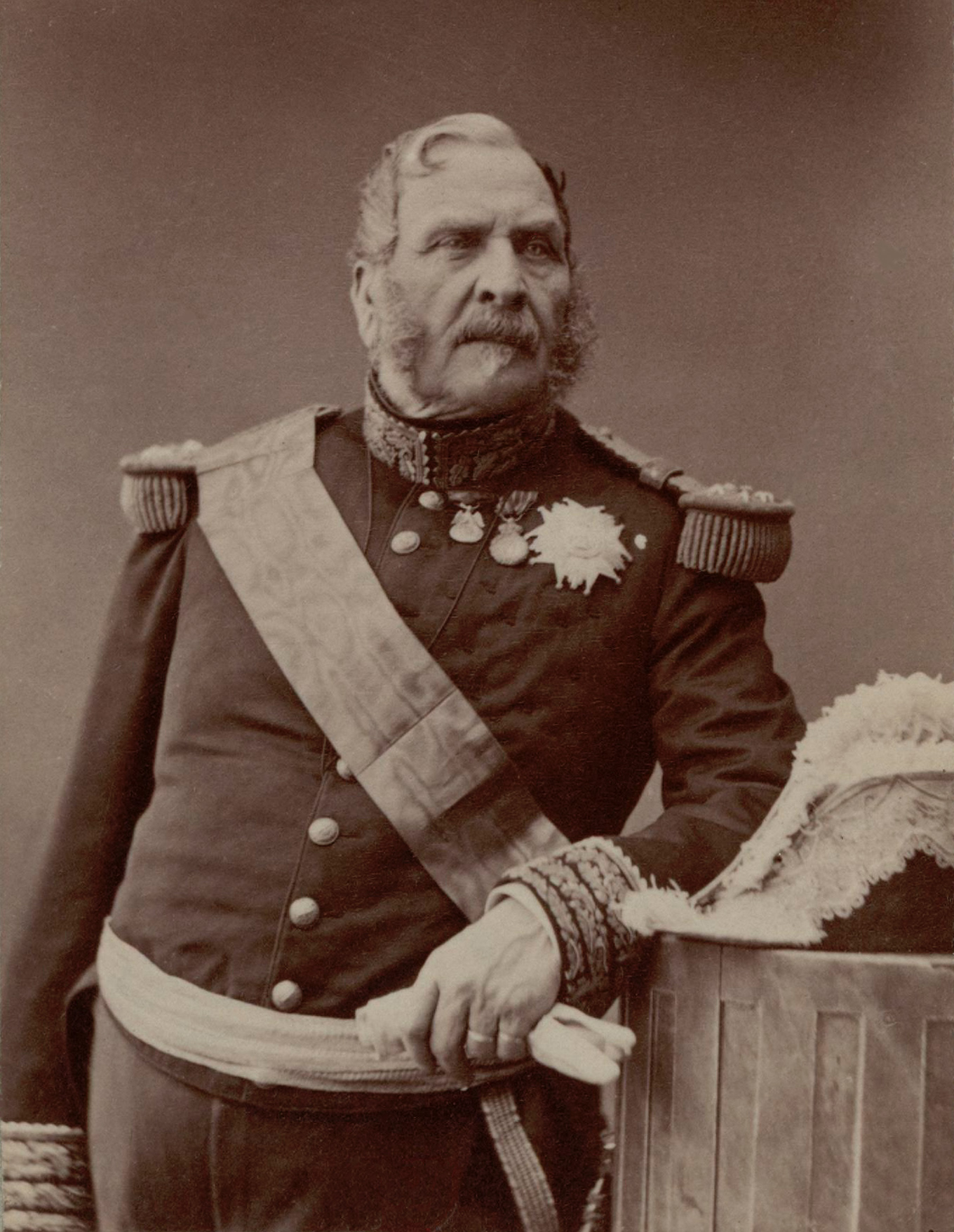
- Magnan, photographed by Nadar before 1865
- Born: 7 December 1791; Paris, France
- Died: 29 May 1865 (aged 73); Paris, France
- Burial place: Saint Germain-en-Laye Old Communal Cemetery
- Military career
- Allegiance: First French Empire; Bourbon Restoration; July Monarchy; French Second Republic; Second French Empire
- Branch: French Army
- Service years: 1809–1865
- Rank: Maréchal de France
- Conflicts: Napoleonic Wars; Peninsular War; Hundred Days; Spanish Campaign; Conquest of Algeria
- Awards: Legion of Honour (Grand Croix)

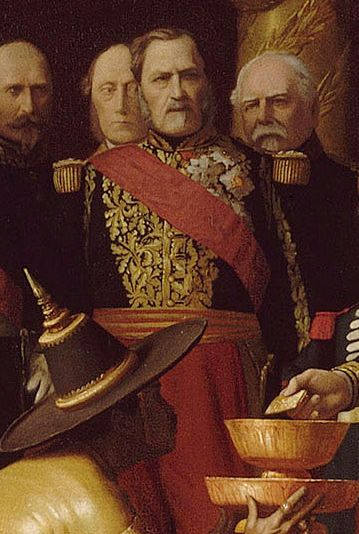
Bernard Pierre Magnan

Bernard Pierre Magnan (7 December 1791 in Paris – 29 May 1865 in Paris) was a Marshal of France.

Magnan started his career as an enlisted soldier of the 66th Line in 1809. Promoted to sergeant in 1810, the next year he entered the officers ranks and was successively promoted 2nd lieutenant, 1st lieutenant and captain. From 1810 to 1813 Magnan took part in the Peninsular War. In January 1814 he was transferred to the Imperial Guard, with which he took part in the French campaign of 1814, being wounded at Craonne. On half pay during the Bourbon Restoration, he rejoined Napoléon's Imperial Guard during the Hundred Days.

After Waterloo and the Second Restoration, he transferred to the 6th regiment of the Royal Guard. In 1820 he was made a battalion commander in the 34th Line, in 1820 he became lieutenant-colonel in the 60th Line. In 1823 he took part in the Spanish campaign. Promoted to colonel of the 49th Line, he took part in the conquest of Algeria.

Magnan joined general officers rank in 1835 when he was made maréchal du camp. From 1832 to 1839 Magnan served in Belgium as part of a French force stationed there to safeguard the newly won Belgian independence. From 1839 to 1845 he was commander of the department du Nord. In 1845 he was promoted to général de division. In 1848 he commanded at Lyon until he was wounded during the insurrection. In July 1849 he was given command of the 4th military Division in Strasbourg, the same year he became a deputy for the department of the Seine.

In June 1851 he became commander of the army in Paris in which function he was one of the principal organizers of the coup d'État of 2 December 1851. The next year Napoléon III made him a senator and granted him the title of Marshal of France.

== Honours ==
- Second French Empire: Baton of Maréchal de France
- Second French Empire: Grand Croix of the Legion of Honour
- Second French Empire: Médaille militaire
- Second French Empire: Saint Helena Medal
- Bourbon Restoration: Knight of the Order of Saint Louis
- Baden: Grand Croix of the Order of the Zähringer Lion
- Austrian Empire: Commander of the Order of Leopold
- Spain: Grand Croix of the Laureate Cross of Saint Ferdinand
- Kingdom of Portugal: Commander of the Order of Christ
- Belgium: Grand Cordon of the Order of Leopold
- Kingdom of Italy: Grand Croix of the Order of Saints Maurice and Lazarus
- Tunisia: Grand Cordon of the Order of Glory
