= Eugène Pastré =

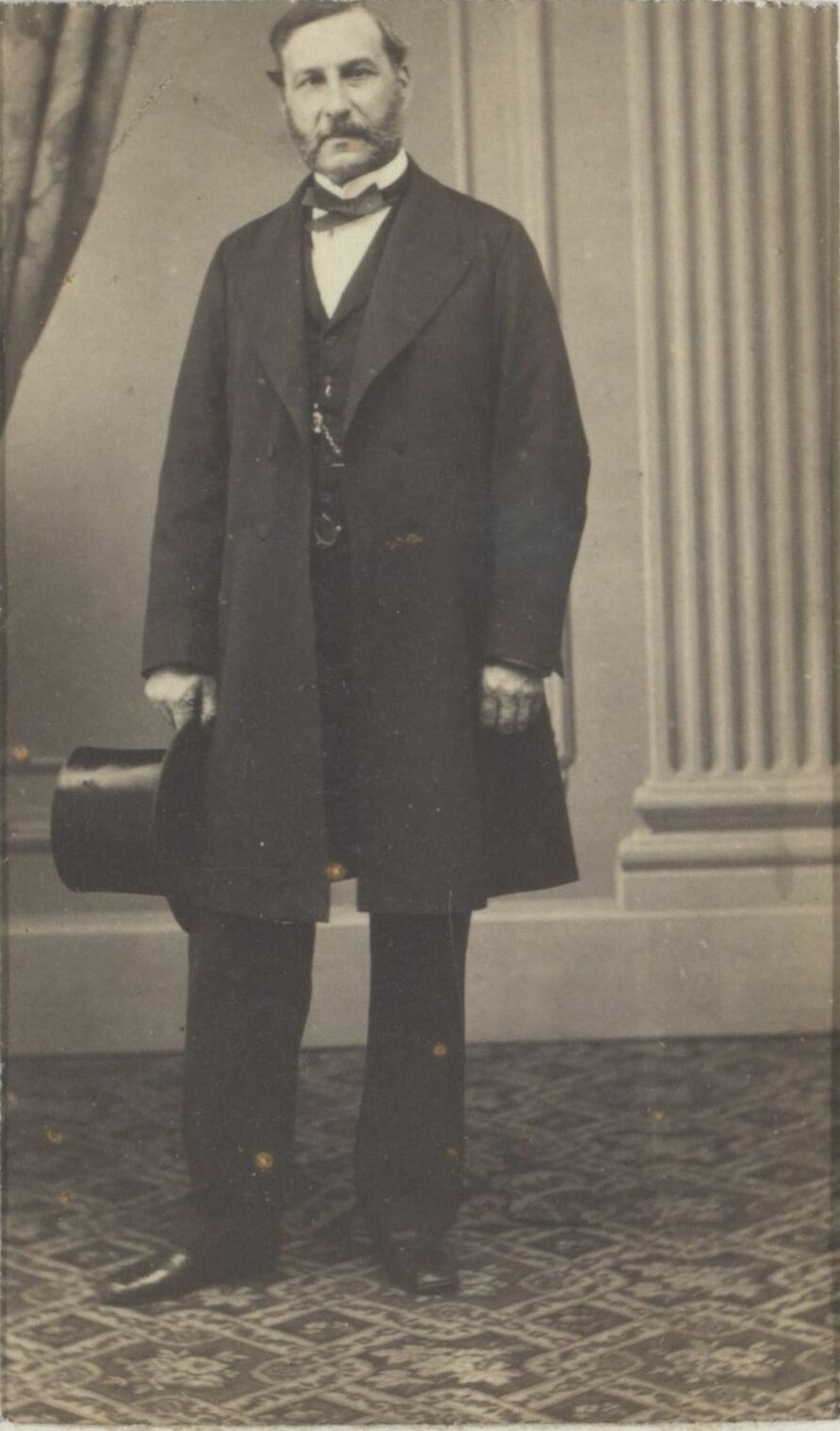
- Eugène Pastré (by Gaetano Gallino)
- Born: 15 December 1806
- Died: 1 March 1868 (aged 61)
- Occupations: Shipowner and merchant
- Known for: Campagne Pastré
- Relatives: Jean Pastré (grandson)

Eugène Pastré (15 December 1806 – 1 March 1868) was a French shipowner and merchant, and the first owner of the Château Pastré in Marseille, France.

== Businessman ==
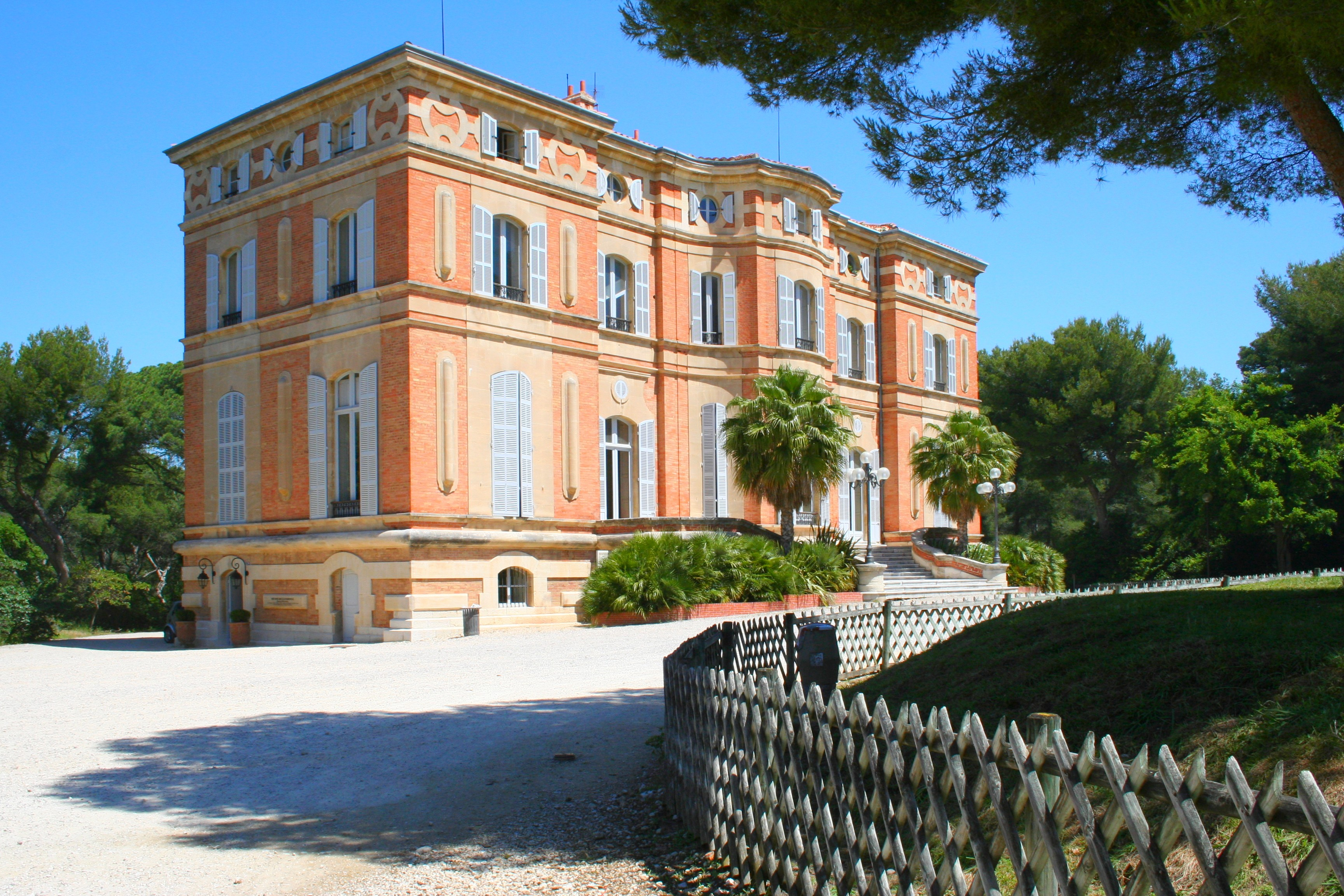
Château Pastré

Eugène Pastré was the son of the tanner and shipowner Jean François Pastré (1758-1821) and his wife Eugénie Sabine Gautier (1776-1862). He was the fourth of five children. A visitor to Alexandria, Egypt in 1833-1834 described Eugène Pastré as one of the two leaders of the European community there. Later his brother Jules Pastré conducted the family business in Alexandria, where he lived for forty years. In October 1854 Jules gave a brilliant fête with fireworks in honour of the new Khedive, Saïda-Pasha, that was attended by leading dignitaries from Cairo and representatives of European countries.

The Pastré family fortune was made and lost in fifty years. After the death of their father, starting in 1825 the five brothers, Jean-Baptiste, Jules, Paul, Eugène and Joseph Pastré, quickly expanded into shipping and trade between Europe and the East, and even into banking. They were involved in the cotton and wheat trade, agricultural and industrial equipment and public works. Eugène specialized in the English end of the business.

In an 1851 report, the French consul in Egypt reported that the commercial paper of the Maison Pastré frères was more valued than that of the major Italian and English houses. From Alexandria the family extended to China, India, the Persian Gulf, Tunisia and West Africa. The fortune proved ephemeral. After the 1860s, after the death of Eugène and two of his brothers, the family proved unable to adapt to changes in the political situation in Egypt, particularly the crisis of 1875-1880 in which the financial market of Alexandria collapsed. and their affairs were eventually wound down.

== Marseille residence ==
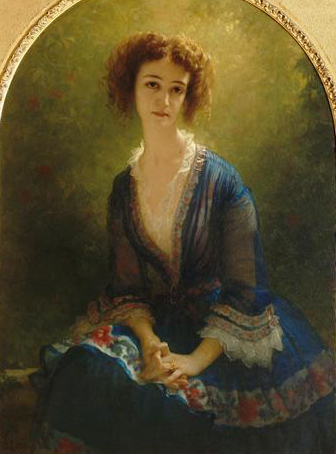
Céline, Comtesse Eugène Pastré in 1851, by Ernest Hébert

Between 1836 and 1853 the Pastré family accumulated 120 hectares (300 acres) of land between Pointe Rouge and the Grotte Rolland in the south of Marseille, which they made into a park. The Pastrés had three large houses built there between 1845 and 1865: the Château Estrangin, Château Pastré and Château Sanderval. The well-known architect Jean-Charles Danjoy designed the Château Pastré, the largest of the buildings, completed in 1862. It is located between the hills and the Mediterranean Sea, with large windows looking out over the park.

== Society leader ==
Around 1850 Eugène Pastré married Céline de Beaulaincourte-Marles (Note: Mme Pastre's full name was Céline-Henriette-Sylvie-Pharaïlde-Angélique de Beaulaincourt-Marles. Her family was well-connected. In 1870, now widowed, she and her sister were among the guests at a small soirée held by the Princess Julie Bonaparte, Marquise de Roccagiovine (1825-1900).) Their son Ange André Pastré (1856-1926) was made a Count of Rome. In 1851 the artist Ernest Hébert (1817-1908) made an oil on wood portrait of Céline, Comtesse Eugène Pastré, now held in the Musée Hébert in Paris. The pianist and composer Gustave Péronnet dedicated one of his piano pieces to Mme Pastré, described as the gracious and spiritual chatelaine of the Prado. (Note: "chatelaine of the Prado" refers to the Avenue du Prado in Marseille, where the Pastrés had a house.) She was not a pupil of Péronnet, but he had provided direction when she had sung the previous winter before the society of Marseille in the role of Rosine in The Barber of Seville.

The Château Pastré was designed to accommodate the lifestyle of wealthy people of that time, which would have involved many large social gatherings. The illustrated papers of the time gave breathless descriptions of these events, such as a ball attended by the Pastrés in 1864 or a play presented at the home of Mme Pastre in 1884.

Eugène Pastré died in 1868.

== Sources ==
- "Bal Donné a Marseille". L' illustration: journal universel. Chevalier. 1864.
- "Chronique de L'Élégance". la nouvelle revue. 1884.
- "Countess Pastre Eugene". TerminArtors.
- Dardano, Isa Basso; Bonaparte, Julie (1975). La princesse Julie Bonaparte marquise de Roccagiovine et son temps. Mémoires inédits (1853-1870). Ed. di Storia e Letteratura. p. 527. GGKEY:J9WBCXK0UZU.
- Le Borgne, Jo; Millyard, Chris; Nettl, Marietta; Roumieu, Anne (June 2008). "MARSEILLE MUSEUMS". Anglo-American Group of Provence. Archived from the original on 2014-06-19.
- "Le Château Pastré". Camping Marius. Archived from the original on 2011-09-20.
- Nerval, Gérard de (1867). "Voyage en Orient".
- "Parc Pastré". Ville de Marseille.
- Thiveaud, Jean-Marie (1994). "Un marché en éruption : Alexandrie (1850-1880)". Revue d'économie financière. 30 (3): 273–298. doi:10.3406/ecofi.1994.2550.
- Tribune artistique et littéraire du midi. Société artistique des Bouches-du-Rhone. 1860. p. 258.
