= Aix-en-Provence Festival =

Annual international music festival in Aix-en-Provence, France

Aix-en-Provence Festival Festival d'Aix-en-Provence
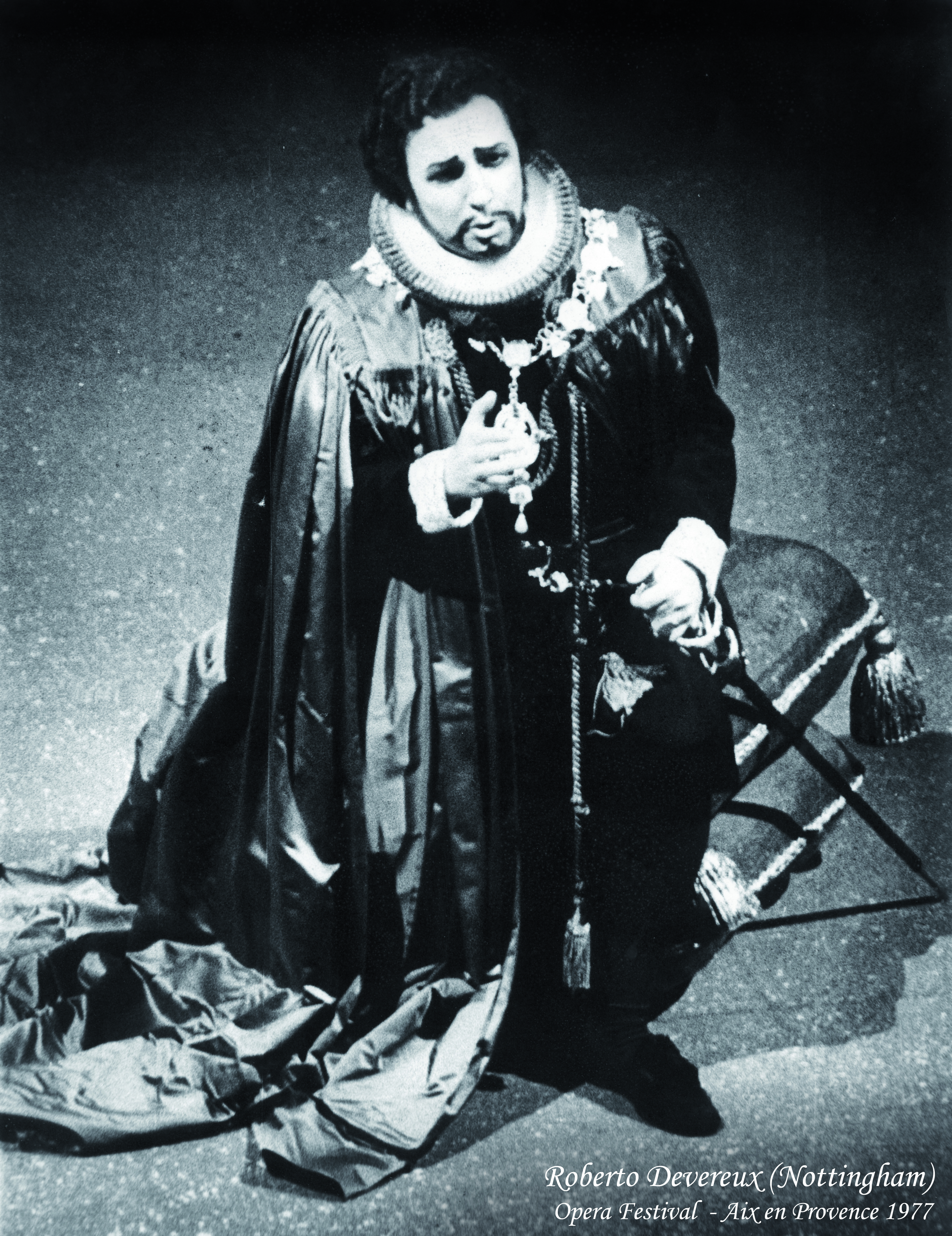
- Baritone performing the role of the Duke of Nottingham from Roberto Devereux at the Aix-en-Provence Festival 1977
- Status: Active
- Genre: Music festival
- Date: July
- Frequency: Annually
- Location: Aix-en-Provence
- Inaugurated: July 1948
- Founder: Lily Pastré
- Website: Festival d'Aix-en-Provence official website

The Festival d'Aix-en-Provence is an annual international music festival which takes place each summer in Aix-en-Provence, principally in July. Devoted mainly to opera, it also includes concerts of orchestral, chamber, vocal and solo instrumental music.

== Establishment ==
The first festival took place in July 1948. It was founded by Countess Lily Pastré, who covered the entire costs in 1948. It was made up of three or four concerts in the cour de l'Archevêché, a concert in the Saint-Sauveur cathedral, and six further concerts and recitals in various locations throughout the town. An opera was added to these concerts, Mozart's Così fan tutte, a work practically unknown by the French public at the time. However, it was not until 1949 that the festival became a success with its production of Don Giovanni.

From inception until 1974, the festival was directed by Gabriel Dussurget who devoted much attention to the artistic and detailed aspects of the productions, which in turn attracted much attention to the festival.

In 1970, Mstislav Rostropovich premiered Henri Dutilleux's Tout un monde lointain..., now considered one of the most important additions to the cello repertoire of the 20th century, at the festival.

Under the direction of Bernard Lefort from 1974 to 1982, the Festival became devoted to bel canto opera and, in general, a celebration of the voice. Performances of 19th century operas by Verdi and Donizetti were given by the reigning stars of bel canto such as Montserrat Caballé, José Carreras, Marilyn Horne, and Katia Ricciarelli, and the Festival spread throughout the town.

From 1982, a broadening of the repertoire to include baroque to modern operas (Britten and Prokofiev, in particular) characterized the era of director Louis Erlo, who gave preference to Mozart by staging new productions of his most famous works, but also the early operas written in the composer's youth.

In 1998 Stéphane Lissner took over the festival, accomplishing a complete renovation of the Théâtre de l'Archevêché and thus making it the heart of the Festival. New operas were commissioned, for example the 2005 production of Julie by the Belgian composer Philippe Boesmans, based on Strindberg's Miss Julie.

In 2006, it featured concerts and operas as well as master classes. These included Wagner's Das Rheingold conducted by Sir Simon Rattle with Sir Willard White as Wotan; Mozart's The Magic Flute, conducted by Daniel Harding; Rossini's The Italian Girl in Algiers; the Berlin Philharmonic playing Mahler's 5th Symphony; and Pierre Boulez, conducting and on the piano and works by Henry Purcell.

From 2007 the festival was directed by Bernard Foccroulle, who commissioned, among others, George Benjamin's opera with Martin Crimp Written on Skin. Foccroulle was replaced in 2018 by Pierre Audi.

In 2019, the festival had a budget of around €22 million, of which €8 million subsidies and more than 60% self-financed by ticketing and sponsoring.

== Performance spaces ==
Performances are given in a variety of locations, including:

- the Théâtre de l'Archevêché, in the courtyard of the former archbishop's palace
- the Grand Théâtre de Provence, opened in 2007
- the Jeu de Paumes, a restored 18th century theatre
- the courtyard of the Hôtel Maynier d'Oppède
- the Théâtre du Grand Saint-Jean, in the grounds of a chateau near Aix

== See also ==
- List of opera festivals
