= Jean Pastré =

French polo player

- Born: 2 December 1888; Marseille, France
- Died: 29 June 1960 (aged 71); Paris, France
- Occupation: Polo player
- Spouse: Lily Pastré
- Parent(s): Ange André Pastré; Clara Goldschmidt
- Relatives: Eugène Pastré (paternal grandfather)

Count Jean André Hubert Pastré (2 December 1888 – 29 June 1960) was a French polo player. He played polo at the 1924 Summer Olympics.

== Early life ==
Jean Pastré was born in 1888. He was the son of Count Ange André Pastré (1856-1926) and Clara Goldschmidt (1866-1930). His paternal grandfather, Eugène Pastré, was a French shipowner and merchant, and the first owner of the Château Pastré in Marseille.

== Polo ==
Pastré became a polo player. In 1913, he played polo as part of the Red Devils team alongside Captain J. Jaubert, F. Egan, E. Targett in the Laversine Open Polo Cup at the Château de Laversine, Baron Robert de Rothschild's estate near Chantilly. A year later, in 1914, he played as a member of the Quidnuncs team alongside Captain C. G. Higgins, Captain E. D. Miller, and M. F. Mallet at the Cote d'Azur Polo Club in Mandelieu near Cannes. The Duke of Westminster was in attendance. Several years later, in 1922, he played polo in Mons, Belgium alongside R. Bamberger, Count Jean de Madre, and Hubert de Monbrison. The match was attended by the Prime Minister, Poincare, and his wife, as well as Marshal Philippe Pétain.

He played polo at the 1924 Summer Olympics alongside Count Charles de Polignac, Hubert de Monbrison and Count Pierre de Junilhae, against the American team, composed of Thomas Hitchcock, Frederick Roe, Rodman Wanamaker, and Elmer Boeseke.

He served as the first secretary of the French Polo Federation.

== Personal life ==
He married Marie-Louise Double de Saint-Lambert, a philanthropist from Marseille, who became known as Countess Lily Pastré. They had three children: Nadia, Nicole and Pierre. They resided in Paris and summered at the Château Pastré in Marseille. They divorced in 1940, and she was given the château.

== Death ==
He died in 1960.
