= Anadrome =

Word whose spelling is derived by reversing the spelling of another word

An animation of the anadrome of wolf and flow.

An anadrome (Note: Also called (often humorously) a semordnilap or emordnilap, and sometimes called a levidrome.: Semordnilap is an anadrome of palindromes. According to author O. V. Michaelsen in his 1997 book Words at Play, semordnilap was probably first used by recreational linguist Dmitri Borgmann, cited by Martin Gardner in the revised edition of Charles Carroll Bombaugh's Oddities and Curiosities of Words and Literature (1961).; Levi Budd, a boy from Toronto, Canada, coined levidrome in 2017, and there were attempts to get it recognized by Merriam-Webster and Oxford English Dictionary. In 2018, Oxford replied that it is still not ready. As of 2021, it is still being requested.) is a word or phrase whose letters can be reversed to spell a different word or phrase. For example, desserts is an anadrome of stressed. An anadrome is therefore a special type of anagram. The English language is replete with such words.

The word anadrome comes from Greek anádromos (ἀνάδρομος), "running backward", and can be compared to palíndromos (παλίνδρομος), "running back again" (whence palindrome).

There is a long history (dating at least to the fourteenth century, as with Trebor and S. Uciredor) of alternate and invented names being created out of anadromes of real names; a proper noun conceived in this way is sometimes called an ananym, especially if it is used as personal pseudonym. Unlike typical anadromes, these anadromic formations often do not conform to any real names or words. Similarly cacographic anadromes are also characteristic of Victorian back slang, where for example yob stands for boy.

== Examples ==
The English language has a very large number of single-word anadromes, by some counts more than 900. Examples include:

- two letters: am ↔ ma; eh ↔ he; ew ↔ we; no ↔ on
- three letters: bro ↔ orb; dog ↔ god; gum ↔ mug; was ↔ saw; nip ↔ pin; dew ↔ wed; dam ↔ mad; net ↔ ten; pan ↔ nap
- four letters: edit ↔ tide; evil ↔ live; liar ↔ rail; part ↔ trap; star ↔ rats; loop ↔ pool; pets ↔ step; deep ↔ peed; wolf ↔ flow; stop ↔ pots
- five letters: denim ↔ mined; knits ↔ stink; lever ↔ revel; peels ↔ sleep; regal ↔ lager
- six letters: denier ↔ reined; diaper ↔ repaid; drawer ↔ reward; pupils ↔ slip-up
- seven letters: amaroid ↔ diorama; deliver ↔ reviled; gateman ↔ nametag
- eight letters: desserts ↔ stressed

An anadrome can also be a phrase, as in no tops ↔ spot on. The word redrum (i.e., "red rum") is used this way for murder in the Stephen King novel The Shining (1977) and its film adaptation (1980).

Anadromes exist in other written languages as well, as can be seen, for example, in Spanish orar ("to pray") ↔ raro ("strange") or French l'ami naturel ("the natural friend") ↔ le rut animal ("the animal rut").

=== Invented anadromes ===
anadrome	derivation	description	references
daraf	farad	a unit of elastance equal to the reciprocal farad	
emirp	prime	a prime number that results in a different prime when its digits are reversed	
emordnilap	palindrome	synonym of anadrome	
gnip gnop	ping pong	reminiscent of the other tabletop game	
mho	ohm	a unit of electrical conductance which is the reciprocal of an ohm; now known by its official SI name "siemens", although mho is still sometimes used	
namyats	Stayman	bridge convention invented by Sam Stayman, who also invented the Stayman convention.	
nimda	admin	the computer worm assumed admin-like powers.	
semordnilap	palindromes	synonym of anadrome	
tink	knit	to unknit	
xallarap	parallax	converse microlensing effect	
yrneh	henry	A unit of measurement for reciprocal electrical inductance.	

=== Ananyms and anadromic names ===
ananym	derivation	description	type	references
Adanac	Canada	a tourist cottage in Ontario	proper name	
Adanac[s]	Canada	a Canadian lacrosse team	team name	
Adaven	Nevada	ghost town	proper name	
Airegin	Nigeria	composer Sonny Rollins is African American	song name	
Aksarben	Nebraska	Various groups and locations in Nebraska	proper name	
Allerednic	Cinderella	A "riches to rags" tale as opposed to Cinderella's rags to riches. Used by Jonathan Gershuny of high-achieving women whose careers stall after marriage.	proper name	
Alucard	Dracula	borne by various characters inspired by Bram Stoker's novel Dracula (1897)	proper name	
Ani Lorak	Karolina	stage name of Karolina Kuiek	pseudonym	
Arbok	Kobra	Pokemon resembling a cobra	proper name	
Azed	Deza	pen name of Jonathan Crowther, after Spanish inquisitor Diego Deza	pseudonym	
[C. W.] Ceram	Marec	pen name of German journalist K. W. Marek (latinized Marec)	pseudonym	
Dioretsa	asteroid	asteroid with retrograde orbit	proper name	
Dnoces	"second"	Apollo program joke by Grissom, after Edward H. White II	proper name	
Ebbot [Lundberg]	Tobbe	Tobbe is the usual hypocoristic of his given name Torbjörn	pseudonym	
Eivets Rednow	Stevie Wonder		album name	
Ekans	Snake	Pokemon resembling a snake	proper name	
elgooG	Google	reverse-spelling search engine	company name	
Navi	Ivan	Apollo program joke by Virgil Ivan Grissom	proper name	
Erewhon	"nowhere"	A utopia and the title of an 1872 novel by Samuel Butler. The digraph <wh> is not reversed. Many names within the book are also ananyms.	proper name	
Erised	"desire "	The Mirror of Erised in Harry Potter and the Philosopher's Stone bears the inscription in reverse: "I show not your face but your heart's desire."	proper name	
Esio Trot	"tortoise"	children's book by Roald Dahl	book name	
Essiac	Rene Caisse	tea formula invented by Rene Caisse	product name	
Etnaviv	Vivante	open-source driver for Vivante GPU	product name	
Regor	Roger	Apollo program joke by Grissom, after Roger B. Chaffee	proper name	
Гярб вечнълс (Giarb vechnals)	Слънчев бряг (Slanchev briag, "Sunny Beach")	Bulgarian Cyrillic ananym	proper name	
Harpo [Productions]	Oprah	Oprah Winfrey's media company	company name	
I.D.F.B (dnalsI maerD roF elttaB)	Battle for Dream Island	The third season of Battle For Dream Island.	web series	
Kebert Xela	"Alex Trebek"	In "Family Guy", an answer given by Adam West to "send him back to the fifth dimension where he belongs", in reference to Mister Mxyzptlk	proper name	
Klim	"milk"	a brand of powdered milk sold by Nestlé, early ads featuring the slogan "Spell it backwards"	product name	
Kroz	Zork	homage to older computer game	product name	
Livic	"civil [engineering]"	trade newspaper, "a reflection of Civil Engineering"	company name	
Llamedos	"sod 'em all"	in Terry Pratchett's Discworld novels (compare Llareggub)	proper name	
Llareggub	"bugger all"	in Under Milk Wood	proper name	
MAPS (Mail Abuse Prevention System)	"spam"	reverse backronym	organization name	
Nagirroc	Corrigan	historic home in Florida, after the owner's last name	proper name	
Namor	"Roman"	comic book character named by Bill Everett	proper name	
Nevaeh	"heaven"	feminine given name	proper name	
Nevar	"raven"	In the 2002 TV series Raven, Nevar is the nemesis of the main character. It is also a minor character in an episode of Teen Titans Go! (see Bizarro World). (It is also a possible answer to Lewis Carroll's Mad Hatter riddle in Alice's Adventures in Wonderland.)	proper name	
Niloak Pottery	"kaolin"	material used in products	company name	
Nitsuga	Agustín	stage name of Agustín Barrios-Mangoré	pseudonym	
Nogard	"dragon"	character in Alan F. Beck art series The Adventures of Nogard & Jackpot	proper name	
Nomad	Damon	named for founding member Damon Rochefort	band name	
Nomar [Garciaparra]	Ramon	for his father, Ramon Garciaparra	proper name	
Notsuoh	Houston	name of a historic carnival festival celebrated in Houston from 1899 until World War I. Also a bar in downtown Houston	proper name	
Nujabes	Seba Jun	stage name of Jun Seba	pseudonym	
OAT (organizing autonomous telecomms)	TAO (The Anarchy Organization)	OAT stands for "Organizing Autonomous Telecomms", a reverse backronym of its former name TAO, "The Anarchy Organization"	organization name	
Posdnuos	"sound sop"	stage name of Kelvin Mercer	pseudonym	
Rae Sremmurd	"Ear" "Drummers"	first act signed to hip-hop label EarDrummers Records	band name	
Rednaxela Terrace, Hong Kong	Alexander	believed to have been originally named after a Mr. Alexander, who partially owned the street, but reversed due to a clerical error	proper name	
Rekkof Aircraft	Fokker	Rekkof aircraft are based on Fokker designs. Also Rekkof Restart. Now Fokker Next Gen.	company name	
Rellim	Miller	a farm in West Virginia, named for founder Paul Miller	proper name	
Revilo	Oliver	pen name of cartoonist Oliver Christianson	pseudonym	
Revilo [P. Oliver]	[Revilo P.] Oliver	Revilo was philologist Revilo P. Oliver's name at birth	proper name	
Ridan	Nadir	named after another horse	proper name	
로꾸거 (Rokkugo)	거꾸로 (gokkuro)	"backwards" in Korean.	song name	
Rotanev	Venator	after Niccolò Cacciatore (Called Nicolaus Venator in Latin)	proper name	
Seltaeb	Beatles	the Beatles' merchandising company	company name	
Senim Silla	"All is mines."	stage name of hip hop artist Ross Rowe; "mines" is African-American Vernacular for "mine"	pseudonym	
Senrab [Street]	Barnes	a street in Stepney (whence Senrab F.C.), near Barnes Street	proper name	
Sevas Tra	"Art saves."	debut album of Otep	album name	
Siri	Iris	Iris is a Greek messenger and servant to the Olympians. Siri is the virtual assistant from Apple.	mythology & product name	
Soma [Records]	Amos	after owner Amos Heilicher	company name	
Strebor	Roberts	altered from the company's original name, the Roberts Company	company name	
Sualocin	Nicolaus	after Niccolò Cacciatore (Called Nicolaus Venator in Latin)	proper name	
Tesremos	Somerset	pen name of Derrick Somerset Macnutt	pseudonym	
Trebloc	Colbert	place in Mississippi, named for a local family, whose name is found in many places, and thus altered "to avoid further repetition"	proper name	
Trebor	Robert	14th-century composer whose real name may have been Robert	pseudonym	
Trebor	Robert	Trebor is a confectionary founded by Robert Robertson	company name	
Trebor	Robert	Robert Trebor is the stage name of actor Robert Schenkman.	pseudonym	
Trebor and Werdna	Robert [Woodhead] and Andrew [C. Greenberg]	characters in Wizardry: Proving Grounds of the Mad Overlord computer game named after its programmers	proper name	
Trugoy [the Dove]	"yogurt"	stage name of David Jude Jolicoeur, due to his fondness for yogurt	pseudonym	
Xvid	DivX	a competitor	company name	
Yarg	Gray	Allan and Jenny Gray revived the recipe	product name	
Yellek	Kelley	named for R. J. Kelley, trainmaster at the passing point	proper name	
[Stanley] Yelnats	Stanley [Yelnats]	the main character in Louis Sachar's novel Holes	proper name	
Yen Sid	Disney	the powerful sorcerer in Fantasia (1940), whose apprentice Mickey Mouse causes mayhem after borrowing his master's hat	proper name	

Many jazz titles were written by reversing names or nouns: Ecaroh inverts the spelling of its composer Horace Silver's Christian name. Sonny Rollins dedicated to Nigeria a tune called "Airegin".

A number of Pokémon species, such as the snake Pokémon Ekans and Arbok (cobra backwards with a K), have anadromic names.

== See also ==
- Anagram
- Back slang, use of invented anadromes as coded language
- List of geographic anagrams and ananyms
- Palindrome
- Verlan
- Category:Names derived from word reversals
