= List of geographic anagrams and anadromes =

An animation illustrating the anagrammatical origin of the name of the Florida town El Jobean

These are geographic anagrams and anadromes. Anagrams are rearrangements of the letters of another name or word. Anadromes (also called reversals or ananyms) are other names or words spelled backwards. Technically, a reversal is also an anagram, but the two are derived by different methods, so they are listed separately.

== Anagrams ==
Place names created by anagramming fall into three distinct groups:

- Single letters swapped Sometimes this is due to a typo that did not get fixed. Others are just to make a different name, but not too different, from the original.
- Syllables swapped Usually based on someone's surname.
- Well mixed combinations When a completely different name was desired.

Name	Anagram of	Notes	Reference
Aloha, Oregon	Aloah	Aloah was a small resort in Wisconsin; letters swapped by Post Office during application approval	
Birson, Saskatchewan	Robins	George Cornelius Robins, early settler; now known as Fir Ridge	
Boncar, West Virginia	carbon	Now known as Alloy, West Virginia	
Carol City, Florida	Coral	name changed after Coral Gables threatened to sue	
Dongola, Wisconsin	Gondola	name misspelled (during post office approval?) and never corrected	
El Jobean, Florida	Joel Bean	developer anagrammed his own name	
Elroy, Wisconsin	Leroy	chosen to avoid post office name duplication	
Garus, California	sugar		
Goliad, Texas	Hidalgo (except silent H)	indirect naming for Miguel Hidalgo, Mexican national hero	
Kinhop, Saskatchewan	Hopkins (minus the S)	William Hopkins	
Landrose, Saskatchewan	Roseland	William Roseland	
Lerado, Kansas	Laredo, Texas	post office clerical error resulted in a swap of the E and A	
Linbro Park, Sandton, South Africa	Brolin	local family name	
Lipona Plantation, Florida	Napoli	owned by Prince Achille Murat, former prince of Naples	
Malesus, Tennessee	Samuels	Samuels was a prominent local who did not want the town named for him. Malesus was a compromise	
Medina, North Dakota	median	name changed from Midway, so named because it's about halfway between the extreme east and west of the continent	
Nada, Kentucky	Dana	Dana Lumber Company, which owned the sawmill	
Natércia, Brazil	Caterina	Anagram of the old spelling of Catarina, used by the poet Luís de Camões. Name chosen to not be mistaken by the state of Santa Catarina.	
Neola, West Virginia	Olean, New York		
Romley, Colorado	Morely	Colonel B. F. Morely, mine owner; now a ghost town	
Salitpa, Alabama	Satilpa Creek	error when someone apparently crossed the wrong letter (thus switching the L and T) when applying for a post office	
Shallmar, Maryland	Marshall	"a New Yorker who founded the community"	
Sury Basin, London, England	Sainsbury	street in Kingston upon Thames and location of the town's Sainsbury's supermarket; first part is also a misspelling of Surrey, the town's traditional county	
Ticona, Illinois	Tonica, Illinois	a nearby town	
Vadis, West Virginia	Davis		
Vinsulla, British Columbia	Sullivan	Michael Sullivan, early pioneer	
Windber, Pennsylvania	Berwind	Charles and Edward Berwind, mine owners	

=== Anagram-like constructions of place names ===
A few places names were constructed by arranging a preselected set of letters in an order that made a pronounceable name.

Name	Notes	Reference
Agloe, New York	the initials of Otto G. Lindberg, director of the General Drafting Co., and his assistant, Ernest Alpers. Initially a copyright trap, but then made real by a store taking the name from an Esso road map.	
Delmita, Texas	seven sons of founder Nicéforo G. Peña Sr. each drew a letter	
Solina, Ontario	School teacher John Hughes suggested a name be coined from the letters A I L N O and S. Solina was chosen over several other choices such as Linosa and Sinola	

== Anadromes ==
Name	Reversal of	Notes	Reference
Adanac, Nipissing District, Ontario	Canada		
Adanac, Parry Sound District, Ontario	Canada	community within Carling, Ontario.	
Adanac, Saskatchewan	Canada		
Adaven, Nevada	Nevada	ghost town	
Aksarben Village, Omaha, Nebraska	Nebraska	mixed-use development. Formerly, the Ak-Sar-Ben (arena), a horse race track and indoor arena	
Amabala, Oklahoma	Alabama		
Anidem, Oregon	Medina	named after a previous home/work place of the mine owner, possibly a Medina Mine in Colorado	
Atokad Park	Dakota	location of Atokad Downs horse racing track in South Sioux City, Nebraska	
Cleo, Oregon	O(regon) E(xport) L(umber) C(ompany)	reversed acronym; railroad stop	
Egnar, Colorado	range		
Ekal, Florida	lake		
Ekoms, Oregon	smoke	post office approved but never established; up river from Ragic (q.v.)	
Enola, South Carolina	alone		
Enola Hill	alone	hill in Oregon, applied by a homesteader whose house was isolated	
Etlah, Missouri	halte	German for "stop"	
Lebam, Washington	Mabel Goodell	daughter of early settler	
Lennut, Kentucky	tunnel	now known as Combs, Kentucky	
Maharg, Oklahoma	Graham	reversed due to postal name conflict; now named Foss, Oklahoma	
Mahned, Mississippi	Denham	community founder name	
Muroc, California	Ralph and Clifford Corum	now the location of Edwards Air Force Base, formerly Muroc Field	
Nagrom, Washington	Elmer G. Morgan	owner of Morgan Lumber Company	
Namorf, Oregon	George Froman	local resident	
Narod, California	Doran	railroad section foreman's name; RR stop south of Montclair, California	
Nedra, Florida	Arden, Pennsylvania	home town of developers	
Nedrow, New York	Worden	town founder	
Nikep, Maryland	Pekin	former name arbitrarily reversed to avoid postal confusion	
Nillup, Western Australia	Harold Maughan Pullin	popular local who did not want the place named after him	
Nilrem, Alberta	Merlin		
Nivloc, Nevada	Colvin	mine owner	
Nolem, Florida	melon		
Niton, Alberta	not in		
Notla, Texas	Alton Grocery Company	landowner also owned Alton grocery store in Enid, Oklahoma	
Ocapos, Arizona	SO(uthern) PA(acific) CO(mpany)	reversed acronym; also known as Southern Pacific Railroad	
Orestod, Colorado	Dotsero, Colorado	opposite ends of a short railroad line; Dotsero is derived from dot-zero, origin point of rail line	
Radec, California	cedar		
Ragic, Oregon	cigar	post office on the Rogue River(1898–1900); see also Ekoms	
Redart, Virginia	Trader	early settler's name	
Rednaxela Terrace, Hong Kong	Alexander	believed to have been the last name of a former part-owner of the street; name is believed to have been reversed due to a clerical error	
Reklaw, Texas	Margaret Walker	land donor; reversed due to post office name conflict	
Remlap, Alabama	James W. Palmer	First postmaster. A relative of Palmer's was the postmaster of a neighboring town, which he had already named Palmerdale, and the name Remlap was chosen to avoid the confusion of having two similarly named towns in close proximity.	
Remlap, Florida	Palmer	Town developers from Chicago	
Remlig, Texas	Alexander Gilmer	owner of the Gilmer Lumber Company	
Remlik, Virginia	Willis Sharpe Kilmer	estate owned by Kilmer, a patent medicine entrepreneur	
Retlaw, Alberta	Walter R. Baker	Canadian Pacific Railway official	
Retlaw, Oregon	H. L. Walter	Southern Pacific Railroad employee	
Retrop, Oklahoma	Ira J. Porter	first postmaster	
Retsil, Washington	Ernest Lister	Washington Governor (1913–1919)	
Retsof, New York	Foster	town founder	
Revilo, Tennessee	Oliver	brand name of a plow	
Revloc, Pennsylvania	Colver, Pennsylvania	two company towns, owned by Monroe Coal Company	
Robat, South Carolina	Mount Tabor	locality in Union County	
Rolyat, Oregon	Taylor	probably the name of a Post Office official in Washington	
Rotavele, California	elevator		
Sacul, Texas	Lucas	land owner's name; reversed due to post office name conflict	
Saxet, Texas	Texas	locality in Shelby County	
Saxet Lake Park	Texas	park in Victoria County, Texas	
Seloc, South Carolina	Coles		
Senoj Lake Oregon	Jones	person unknown	
Senyah, Florida	Haynes	developer's last name	
Setag, Texas	James T. Gates	company owner	
Silaxo, California	Oxalis, California	Silaxo is a few miles south of Oxalis	
Sniktaw, California	W. F. Watkins	journalist who used Sniktaw as a pseudonym	
Tenoroc Public Use Area, Florida	Coronet	The Coronet Phosphate Company mined this area in the mid-20th century	
Tesnus, Texas	sunset	sunset appearing on a logo of Southern Pacific Railroad	
Ti, Oklahoma	I(ndian) T(erritory)	reversed abbreviation; named before territory was renamed to Oklahoma	
Tinrag, Texas	Garnit	local family name	
Trebloc, Mississippi	Colbert	local family name	
Trevlac, Indiana	Colonel Calvert	resort developer; reversed to avoid duplication	
Wabasso, Florida	Ossabaw Island in Georgia		
Yellek, Ontario	R J. Kelley	trainmaster for Canadian Pacific Railway	
Yewed, Oklahoma	Admiral George Dewey	reversed due to post office name conflict	

=== Imperfect ananyms ===
Name	Reversal of	Notes	Reference
Enola, Nebraska	T. J. Malone	founder; omitted the M when reversed.	
Lionilli, Kentucky	Illinois	intended to be Sionilli, but name misrecorded by post office clerk	
Nonnell, Kentucky	John Lennon	L&N RR maintenance supervisor; extra L	
Revelo, Kentucky	Oliver	railroad construction engineer; formerly spelled Revilo; name changed for unknown reasons	
Revillo, South Dakota	J. S. Oliver	railroad man; extra L added.	
Samoth, Illinois	John R. Thomas	Congressman from Illinois; TH kept intact for pronunciation	
Sarben, Nebraska	Nebraska	omitting the KA	
Mount Sniktau, Colorado	Watkins	"Sniktau" was a pen name of journalist E. H. N. Patterson, who borrowed and modified W. F. Watkins's nom de plume; see Sniktaw above	
Tensed, Idaho	Pierre-Jean De Smet	Belgian missionary; reversed due to post office name conflict, and then misspelled during name approval process	
Yelrome, Illinois	Isaac Morley	Mormon elder; E added for pronunciation; town burned down by anti-Mormon mob in 1845	
Yesmar, Alabama	Ramsay	local family name, but with an E replacing an A.	

== See also ==
- Anagram
- Ananym
- List of geographic acronyms and initialisms
- List of geographic portmanteaus
