= Springtime Tallahassee =

Floridian event

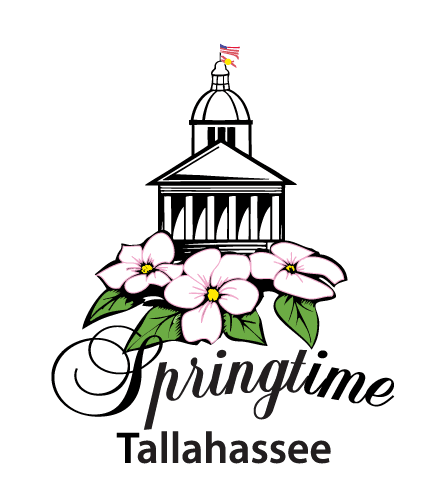
Springtime Tallahassee logo

Springtime Tallahassee is an annual event held on either the last Saturday in March or the first Saturday in April in Tallahassee, Florida, United States celebrating Tallahassee's history and culture.

== History ==
Springtime Tallahassee began in 1967 as a concept to keep Tallahassee as the state capital. At the time, Florida had its first Legislature based on reapportionment in which Florida legislators from southern and central Florida were insisting that the capitol be in a more centralized location.

Tallahassee's civic and business leaders mapped a strategy and proposed it to their legislative delegation asking for help. As the legislative session advanced, unkind comments about Tallahassee were made by legislators. This prompted the Junior League of Tallahassee with the Junior League taking the southern and central legislators' wives on a bus tour of old homes in Tallahassee and nearby Monticello. This drew an enthusiastic response. The Rotary Club produced a Chamber of Commerce bulletin called You can see everything in Tallahassee in one hour! and published a historical tourist volume called Tallahassee In View which included excerpts from the long history of Florida's capital city and the surrounding area.

By the Autumn of 1967, there were 20 various groups planning the First Annual Tallahassee Spring Festival. The first festival featured the Apalachee Jubilee with a parade and pageant commemorating the selection of Tallahassee as the capital of territorial Florida.

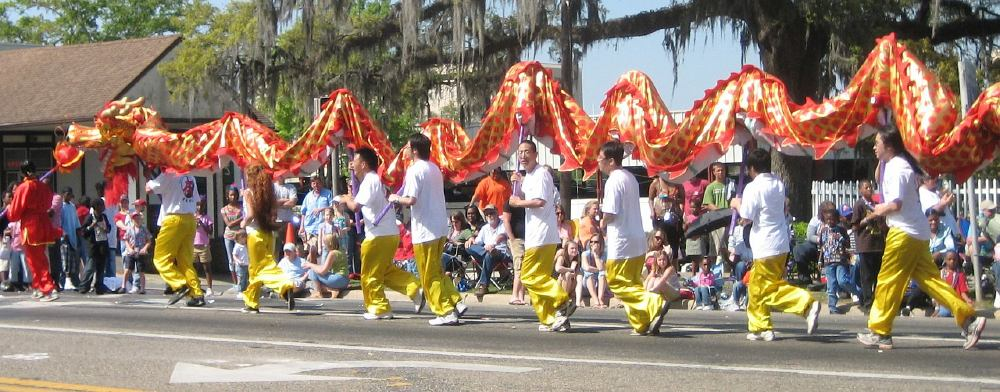
Chinese dragon at Springtime Tallahassee 2008

In 1969 A.F. "Pete" Rich lead a men's group to organize and give direction and financial support to the idea of a festival and his wife, Mrs. Jean Rich, served as General Chairman of the festival. A chartered organization called SpringTime Tallahassee, Inc. dedicated itself to advertise and promote the history and beauty of Tallahassee and its people to all Floridians and welcome them.

By 1970, Springtime Tallahassee membership was increased to 200. By 1971, Springtime Tallahassee changed the format and divided the organization into five krewes which would depict Tallahassee history by historical periods.

The Jubilee in the Park celebration was not held in 2018, due to the organization's lightning policy, anticipated lightning, and a lack of necessary shelters should it be required.

In 2020, Springtime Tallahassee was not held in its entirety due to the COVID-19 pandemic. 2021 saw the event pushed to May 15, the latest date in the event's history. That same year, a parade float honoring Andrew Jackson was replaced by a float featuring the current governor as part of a worldwide movement to remove controversial and racially offensive monuments.

The Grand Parade was not held in 2022, due to the organization's weather policy, anticipated rain forecasts, and a lack of necessary shelters should it be required.

== Events ==
- Breakfast in the Park is the kick-off to the festivities at Springtime Tallahassee. The entire community is invited to eat together in one of the historic parks of downtown Tallahassee with live TV and radio media present.
- The Friday night Music Fest on Kleman Plaza is a free-to-the-public concert, headlined by nationally known talen, held the night before the Parade and Jubilee.
- Springtime Tallahassee Parade features mechanical floats from all over the southeastern United States, elaborately clad characters, and even horse-drawn carriages to provide nostalgia. This parade attracts over 200,000 visitors one of the biggest southeastern parades and craft shows.
- The Jubilee in the Park features a combination of arts and crafts, exhibits, food and entertainment throughout the day.
- A road race, the Springtime 10k, is organized by the Gulf Winds Track Club and immediately precedes the Springtime Tallahassee Parade. The race starts downtown in front of City Hall and winds through the Myers Park neighborhood east of the Capitol, annually drawing approximately 1600 participants.

== Krewes ==
Spanish, American Territorial, Antebellum-Statehood, War and Reconstruction, and 20th Century. This enabled each period to have a float as well as another entry of their choice into the parade to represent their era of history.

=== Spanish Krewe ===
The Spanish Krewe is currently the largest krewe and represents Spanish Florida from 1528 to 1821 and Hernando de Soto's explorations in Florida in 1539. The Spanish Krewe is engaged in numerous philanthropic activities throughout the year. Spanish Krewe participates heavily in each of the five major parties of Springtime Tallahassee, plus Float Day.

=== American Territorial Krewe ===
The American Territorial Krewe represents Florida when it became a United States territory. On March 4, 1824 Governor William P. Duval named Tallahassee the official state capital. Later that year the town was officially named Tallahassee. Tallahassee was incorporated in 1825.

=== Antebellum Krewe ===
The Antebellum Krewe represents the period from 1825–1860 when northern planters moved south to the fertile lands of Leon County. Tallahassee enjoyed social and political development during this period. The nephew of Napoleon Bonaparte, Prince Achille Murat and his wife Catherine Willis Gray, the grandniece of George Washington settled at Bellevue, and became prominent citizens of this community. Florida became the 27th state in 1845 with a population of 66,500. The Krewe collects canned and dry goods and gently used coats and blankets for donation to a local charity. The Krewe's basic theme is southern charm and hospitality.

=== War and Reconstruction Krewe ===
The War and Reconstruction Krewe represents the period from 1861–1900 and the American Civil War. Tallahassee was the only southern capital east of the Mississippi River not captured by the Union troops. War & Reconstruction Krewe members wear period clothing with women in dresses from the 1865–1900 time period. This included bustled dresses and hoop skirts. Men are also suitably dressed for the period. A costume consultant will help any Krewe member find the perfect outfit. The time period includes the Civil War and the reconstruction period.

=== 20th Century Krewe ===
The 20th Century Krewe represents Tallahassee as it grew from a sleepy Southern town to become the thriving capital city of the fourth-largest state in the U.S. Florida state government has been the primary industry. Agriculture, timber and cattle have also played roles in the development of the city's economy. The population of Tallahassee was only 3,000 at the beginning of the century, and now has a population of about 190,000.

=== Belles and Gents ===
A service organization, the Springtime Belles and Gents are composed of high school-age young women and men who are children as well as grandchildren of Springtime members. The young people undergo a training period that encompasses the study of the history of Tallahassee and Florida, as well as instruction in poise, good grooming, and etiquette. They participate in civic, social and government activities. Mr. and Miss Springtime are selected on acquiring community service points, knowledge of Tallahassee and Florida history, interviews by community judges and a vote of their peers. They receive a $500 scholarship from Springtime and are announced at the annual Coronation Ball, and reign during the Springtime Festivities. They, along with senior members, are formally presented to Springtime Tallahassee membership at the Springtime Grand Ball.

=== Governor's Staff ===
Though not truly a krewe, it is a separate unit within Springtime Tallahassee like a sixth krewe. Two members of Springtime are chosen to portray the Governor and his wife the First Lady. The Governor and First Lady serve together with the President and the General Chairman, as representatives of the organization. The Governor's Staff is composed of members of the five Krewes, having been selected by each Krewe for a five-year term.

== Springtime organization ==
Springtime is a civic organization dedicated to the promotion and preservation of Tallahassee history and is headed by the Springtime Board of Directors who meet and operate in downtown Tallahassee.
