= Adanac =

Adanac is the backward spelling of "Canada." It can also refer to these locations:

== In Canada ==
- Adanac, Nipissing District, Ontario
- Adanac, Parry Sound District, Ontario
- Adanac, Saskatchewan
- Adanac Ski Hill in Sudbury, Ontario
- Adanac Park, Vancouver, British Columbia
- Coquitlam Adanacs, box lacrosse team in Coquitlam, British Columbia

== Other ==
- Adanac Military Cemetery in northeastern France
- Adanac Park, Southampton, UK, home of the Ordnance Survey
