= Vadis, West Virginia =

- Unincorporated community
- Location within West Virginia Location within the United States
- Coordinates: 39°02′32″N 80°42′08″W
- Country: United States
- State: West Virginia
- County: Lewis
- Elevation: 771 ft (235 m)
- Time zone: UTC-5 (Eastern (EST))
  - Summer (DST): UTC-4 (EDT)
- Area codes: 304 & 681
- GNIS feature ID: 1548581

Vadis is an unincorporated community in Lewis County, West Virginia, United States. Vadis is 9.5 miles (15.3 km) northeast of Glenville.

Some say the community was named after the novel Quo Vadis by Henryk Sienkiewicz, while others believe the name an anagram of Davis, the name of an early postmaster.

== See also ==
- List of geographic names derived from anagrams and ananyms
