= Redart, Virginia =

Unincorporated community in Virginia, US

Coordinates: 37°28′12″N 76°18′06″W

Location of Redart in Virginia

Redart is an unincorporated community in Mathews County, in the U. S. state of Virginia. The name is a reversal of Trader, the name of an early settler.

== See also ==
- List of geographic names derived from anagrams and ananyms
