= Remlap, Alabama =

- Census-designated place
- Location within Alabama Location within the United States
- Coordinates: 33°47′26″N 86°36′48″W
- Country: United States
- State: Alabama
- County: Blount

Area
  - Total: 16.48 sq mi (42.68 km^{2})
  - Land: 16.27 sq mi (42.14 km^{2})
  - Water: 0.21 sq mi (0.54 km^{2})
- Elevation: 879 ft (268 m)

Population (2020)
  - Total: 2,624
  - Density: 161.3/sq mi (62.26/km^{2})
- Time zone: UTC-6 (Central (CST))
  - Summer (DST): UTC-5 (CDT)
- ZIP code: 35133
- Area codes: 205, 659
- GNIS feature ID: 2804648

Remlap is a census-designated place in Blount County, Alabama, United States, located along Alabama State Route 75, 11.7 miles (18.8 km) southwest of Oneonta. Remlap has a post office with ZIP code 35133.

Remlap is named for the area's Palmer family; the community's name is "Palmer" spelled backwards.

It was first named as a CDP in the 2020 Census which listed a population of 2,624.

== Demographics ==
Historical population
Census	Pop.	Note	%±
2020	2,624		—
U.S. Decennial Census; 1850 1860 1870; 1880 1890-1900; 1910 1920 1930; 1940 1950 1960; 1970 1980 1990; 2000 2010 2020

Remlap was first listed as a census designated place in the 2020 U.S. census.

=== 2020 census ===
As of the 2020 census, Remlap had a population of 2,624. The median age was 40.1 years. 24.7% of residents were under the age of 18 and 18.0% were 65 years of age or older. For every 100 females there were 96.7 males, and for every 100 females age 18 and over there were 93.4 males age 18 and over.

0.0% of residents lived in urban areas, while 100.0% lived in rural areas.

There were 948 households, of which 35.8% had children under the age of 18 living in them. Of all households, 61.1% were married-couple households, 12.8% were households with a male householder and no spouse or partner present, and 22.4% were households with a female householder and no spouse or partner present. About 21.0% of all households were made up of individuals, and 12.3% had someone living alone who was 65 years of age or older.

There were 1,022 housing units, of which 7.2% were vacant. The homeowner vacancy rate was 3.4% and the rental vacancy rate was 4.5%.

Remlap CDP, Alabama – Racial and ethnic composition Note: the US Census treats Hispanic/Latino as an ethnic category. This table excludes Latinos from the racial categories and assigns them to a separate category. Hispanics/Latinos may be of any race.
Race / Ethnicity (NH = Non-Hispanic)	Pop 2020	% 2020
White alone (NH)	2,314	88.19%
Black or African American alone (NH)	38	1.45%
Native American or Alaska Native alone (NH)	4	0.15%
Asian alone (NH)	8	0.30%
Native Hawaiian or Pacific Islander alone (NH)	1	0.04%
Other race alone (NH)	1	0.04%
Mixed race or Multiracial (NH)	127	4.84%
Hispanic or Latino (any race)	131	4.99%
Total	2,624	100.00%

== See also ==
- List of geographic names derived from anagrams and ananyms
