= Mahned Bridge =

- U.S. National Register of Historic Places
- Mississippi Landmark
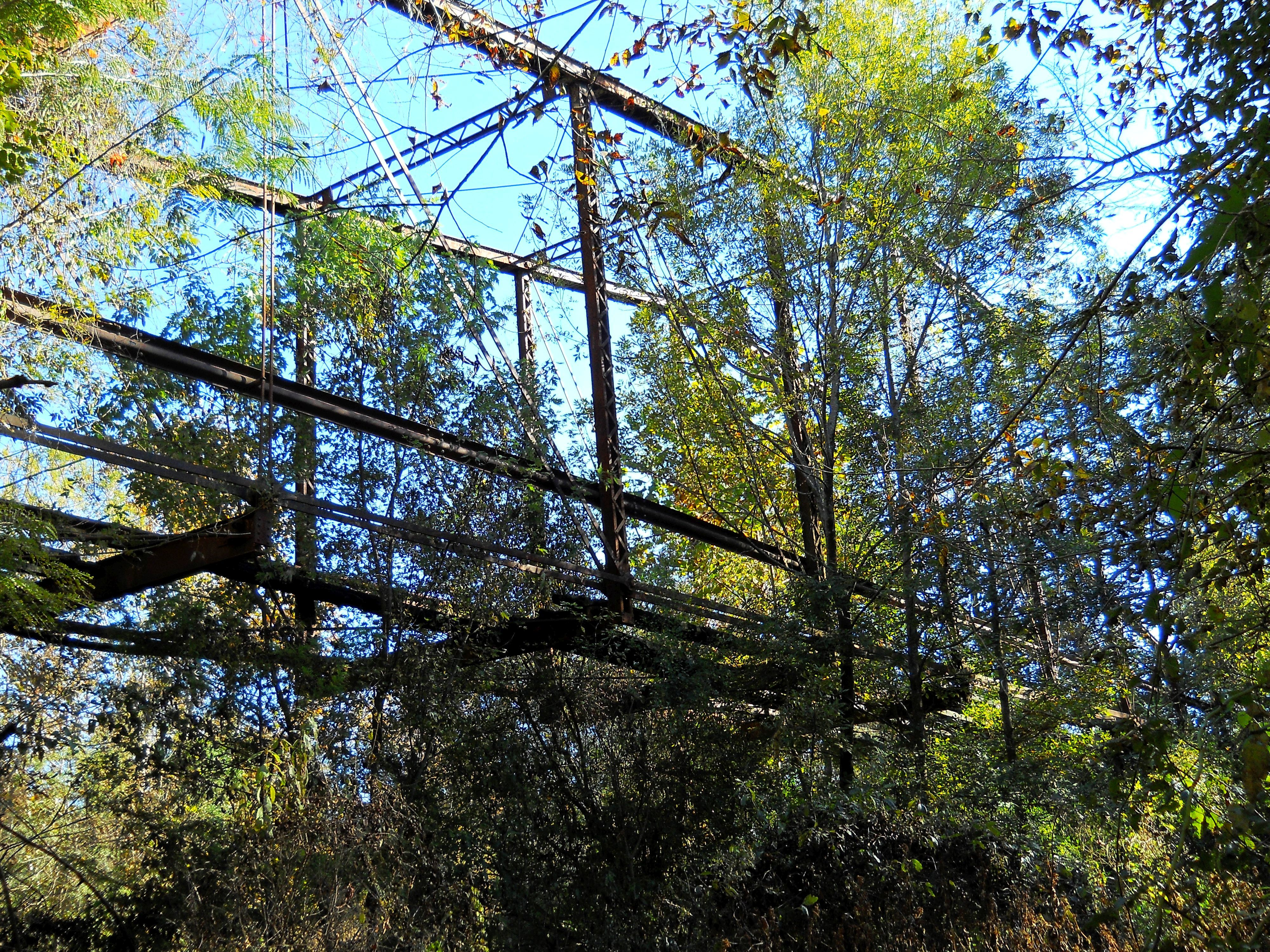
- Underside of camelback truss in 2014

- Location within Mississippi Location within the United States
- Nearest city: New Augusta, Mississippi
- Coordinates: 31°13′37″N 89°5′15″W
- Built: 1903
- Built by: Chicago Bridge and Iron Company
- Architectural style: Camelback & Pratt through truss
- NRHP reference No.: 97001379
- USMS No.: 111-NAU-5002-NR-ML

Significant dates
- Added to NRHP: November 24, 1997
- Designated USMS: April 30, 1996

The Mahned Bridge was constructed in 1903 and spans the Leaf River in Perry County, Mississippi. Around 1980, the bridge was removed from service and access was terminated. The bridge was declared a Mississippi Landmark in 1996 and was added to the National Register of Historic Places in 1997.

== History ==
The Mahned Bridge was constructed by the Chicago Bridge & Iron Company as a prefabricated, one lane, iron truss structure. Completed in 1903, the bridge was one of the first to span the Leaf River in south Mississippi. The bridge derives its name from the nearby rural community of Mahned.

=== Description ===
Two iron trusses, Camelback and Pratt, comprise the main structure and are positioned on metal caissons filled with concrete. Overall length of the two truss spans is 335 feet (102 m). The deck was composed of wooden planking 18 feet (5.5 m) wide, but the deck was removed after the bridge was closed.

=== Notoriety ===
The remote location of Mahned Bridge, several miles from the small town of New Augusta, made it a favorite gathering spot among college and high school students for star gazing and other activities. In September 1993, the vehicle of Angela Freeman, age 17, was found abandoned at Mahned Bridge. Freeman was missing, and the investigation into her disappearance was never solved.

In May 1995, the north end of Mahned Bridge was determined to be the scene of the abduction and murder of William Hatcher, age 27, and Robbie Bond, age 21. The suspect in the Hatcher and Bond murders was subsequently convicted.
