= Tallahassee Museum =

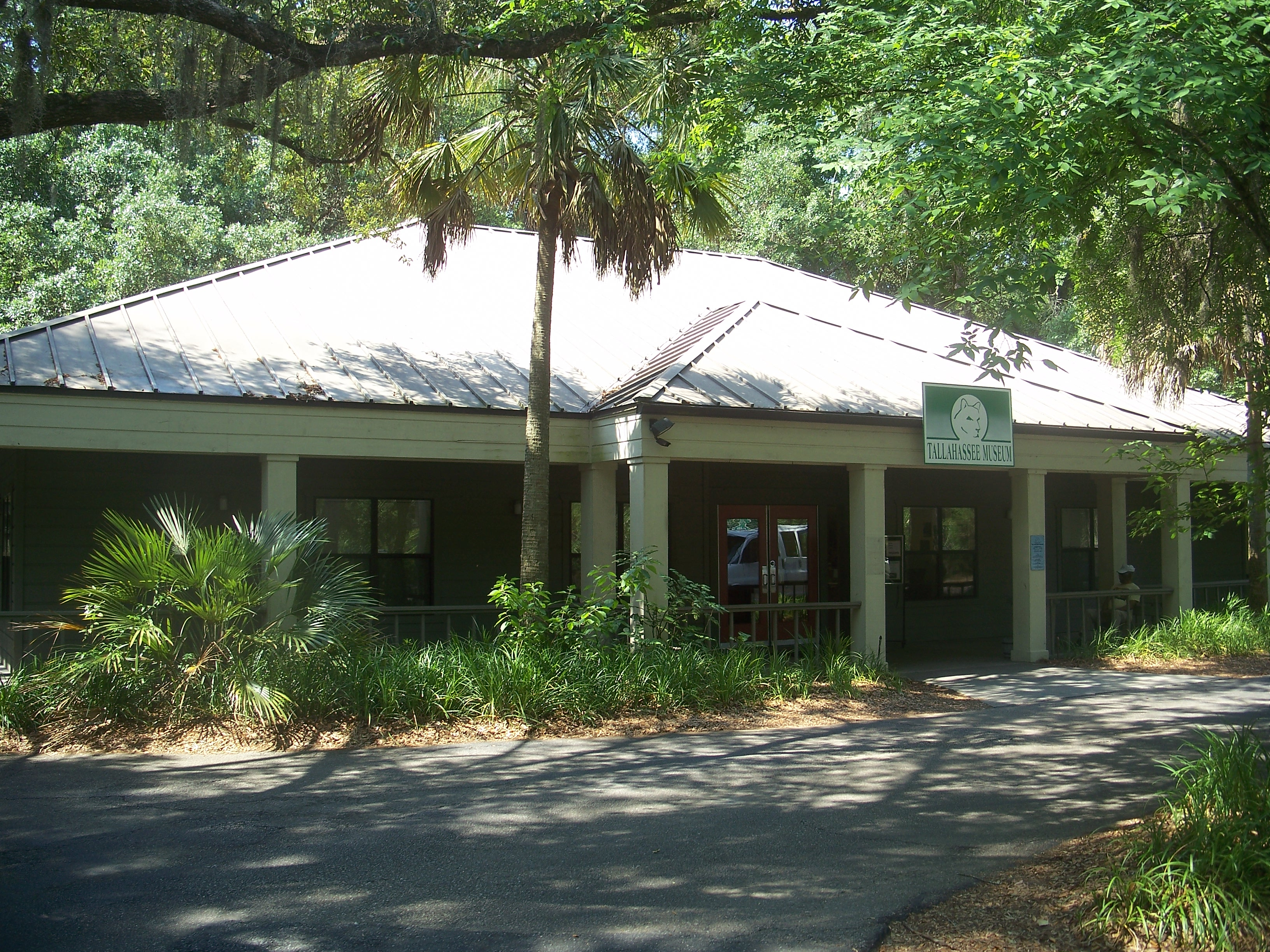
- Entrance to Tallahassee Museum

- Location within Florida
- Established: 1962
- Location: Tallahassee, Florida
- Coordinates: 30.409812°N 84.345452°W
- Website: tallahasseemuseum.org

The Tallahassee Museum is a privately funded, non-profit corporation in Tallahassee, Florida.

The stated purpose of the Tallahassee Museum is "to educate the residents of and visitors to the Big Bend area about the region's natural and cultural history, from the nineteenth century until the present." "Big Bend" refers to that portion of Florida where the Florida panhandle meets the peninsular portion of the state. Tallahassee, Florida's capital city, is centrally located in that region.

== History ==
Discussions in 1957 led to the formation of the "Tallahassee Junior Museum," a name which was eventually changed to "Tallahassee Museum," although the earlier name is still occasionally used. The museum was moved to its current 52-acre (210,000 m2) location in 1962, lodged between Lakes Bradford and Hiawatha, in Leon County, Florida.

== Facilities and exhibits ==
A major strength of the museum lies in the diversity of its exhibits and the multiple utilization capabilities of its facilities.

=== Big Bend Farm ===
A considerable portion of the grounds is devoted to the re-creation of rural life in north Florida in about 1880. Included in that effort are homes, gardens, farm buildings (with appropriate farm animals), a gristmill, and a turpentine commissary.

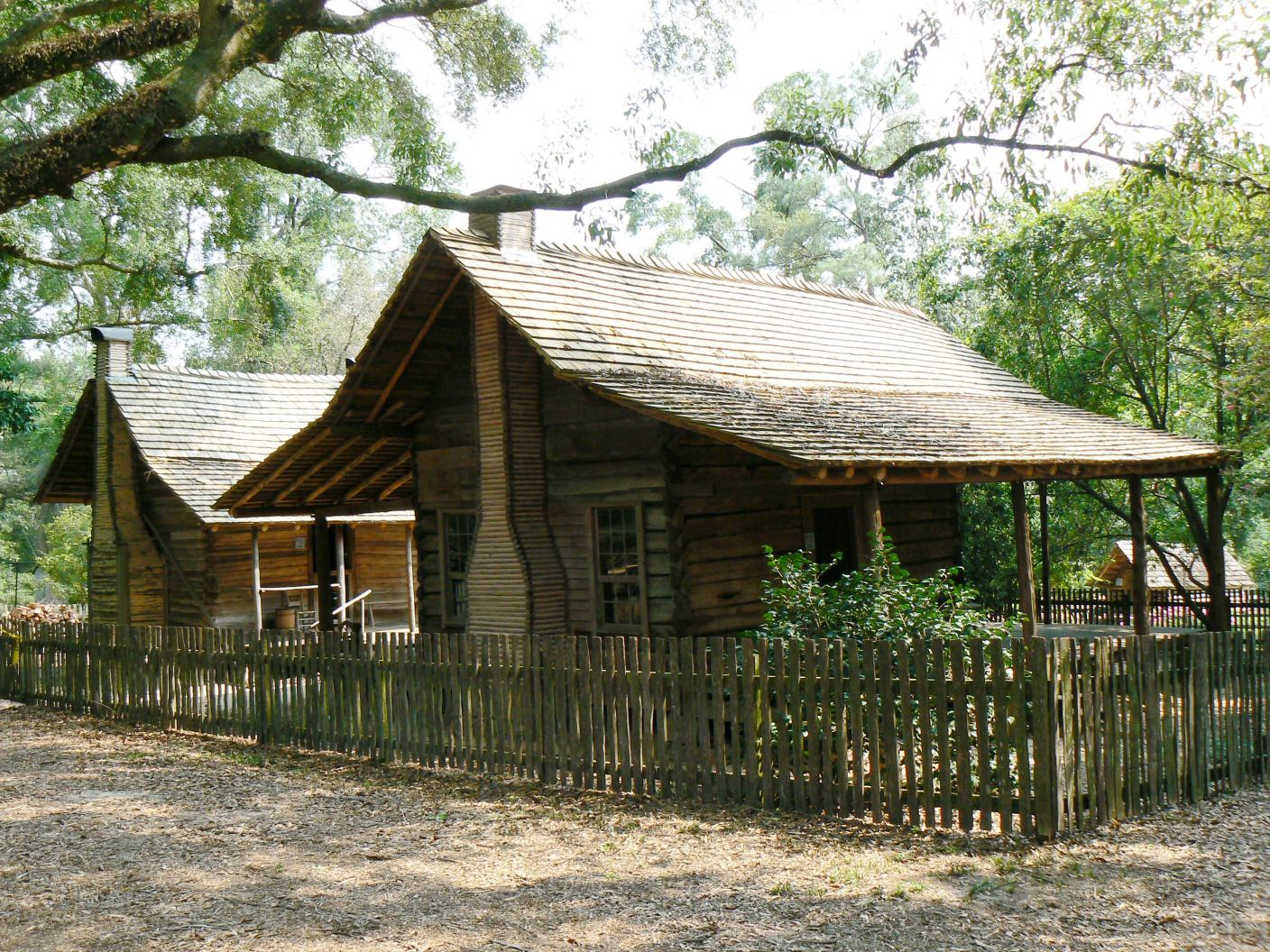
Reconstructed farm houses from 1880, August 2007

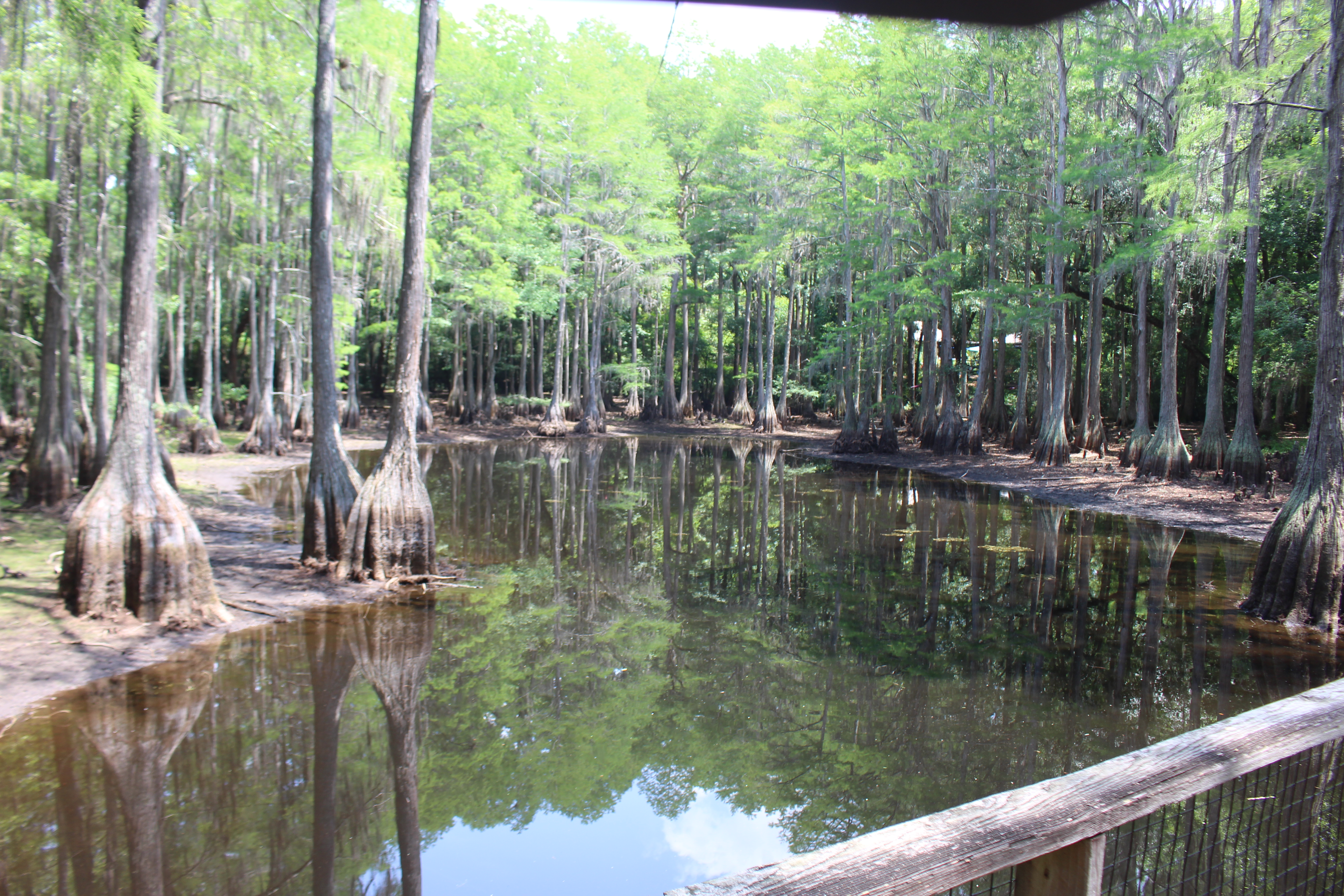
A boardwalk over cypress habitat, May 2023

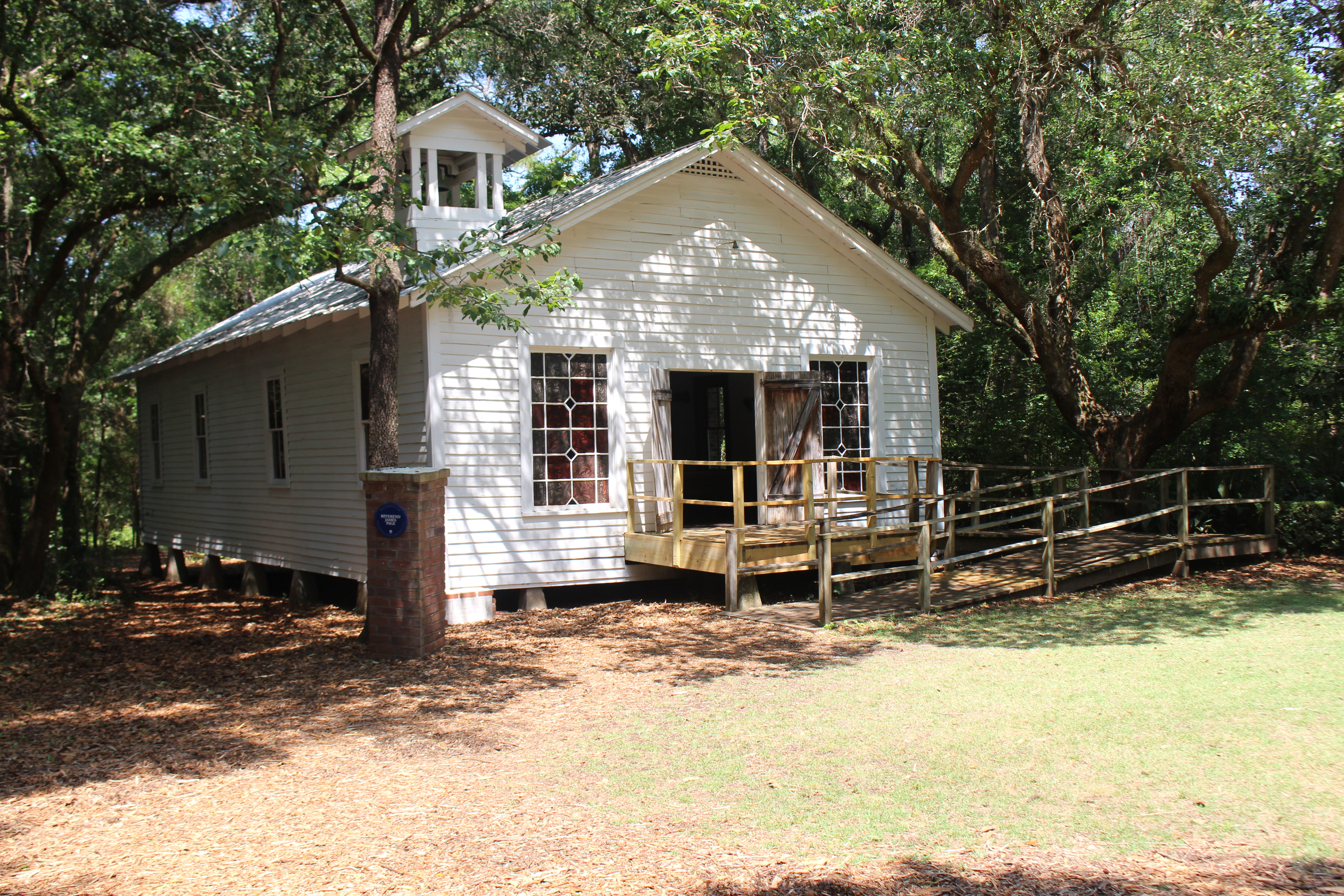
1937 Bethlehem Missionary Baptist Church, May 2023

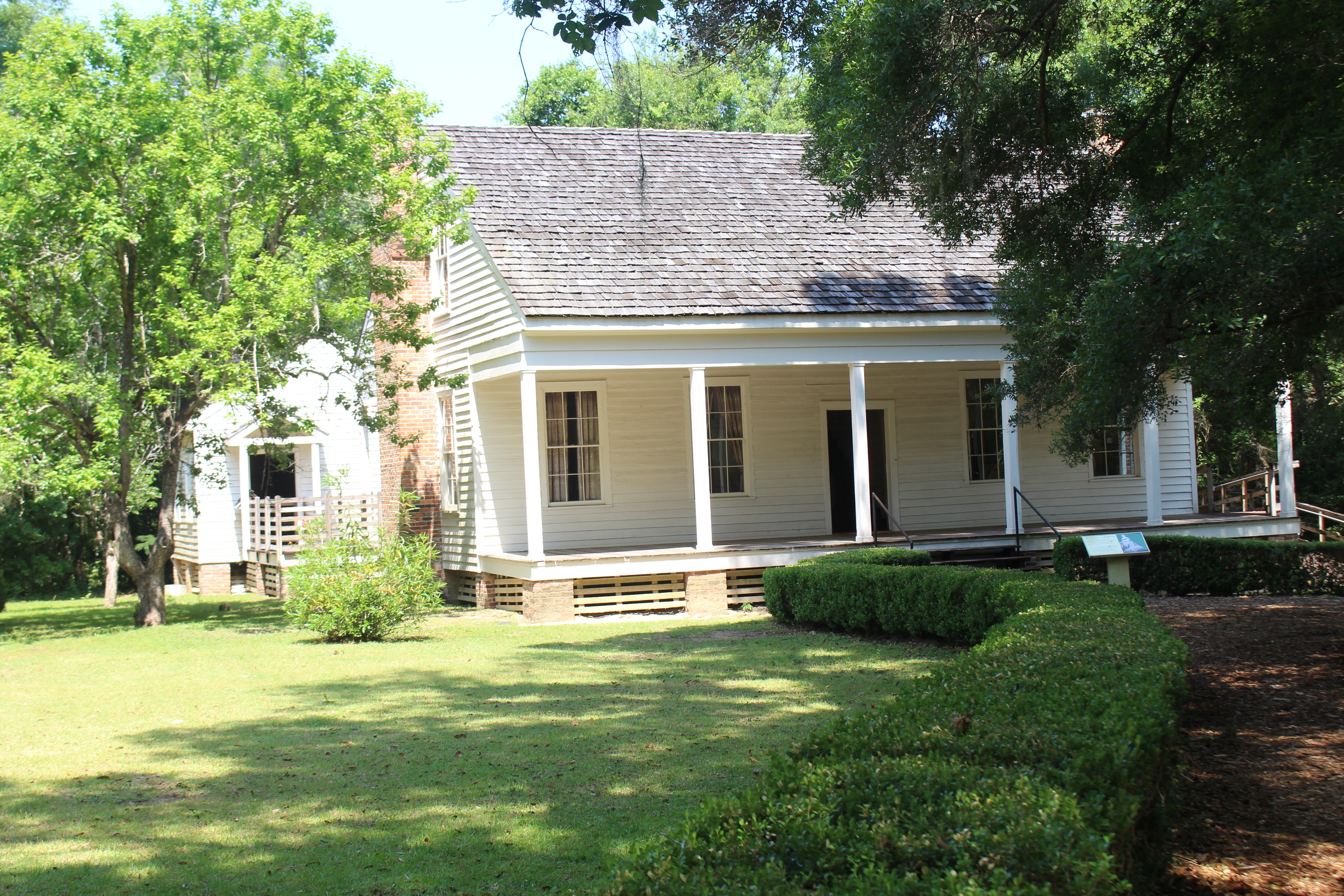
Bellevue Plantation, once the home of Catherine Murat, May 2023

=== Wildlife Florida ===
Another major portion of the museum is devoted to Florida wildlife, with many animals in relatively large, well-vegetated areas, usually similar to native habitats. Of note are black bears, white-tailed deer, and bobcats, as well as several endangered species: red wolves and Florida panthers. There are also several aviaries, a snake exhibit, small mammals, and a "guest" animal habitat, which was introduced in 1988.

Twice a day, there are "Animal Encounters," during which a staff member shows and teaches about an animal. They may show birds of prey, snakes, a rabbit, or a skunk. Many of the animals used for education have been injured, especially birds of prey. Since these animals could not survive in the wild, in accordance with state laws, they must either be used for education or be put down.

=== Old Florida ===
Buildings of historical interest or importance comprise the Old Florida segment of the museum: the 19th century Bellevue Plantation (once the home of Catherine Murat, a relative of George Washington, and wife of Napoleon Bonaparte's nephew Achille Murat), the 1937 Bethlehem Missionary Baptist Church (founded by Rev. James Page, a slave preacher), the 1897 Concord School house, a reminder of early African-American educational facilities, and a 1920s caboose.

=== Florida & Beyond ===
This section includes the Fleischmann Natural Science Building with two freshwater aquaria and facilities for bird watching, the Phipps Gallery with changing exhibits of local art, culture and history, and the Discovery Center, a family interactive area with hands-on exhibits about the natural history and culture of North Florida.

=== Other ===
The museum also has several nature trails, one of which includes a boardwalk over normally flooded cypress habitat, and a number of special-use facilities for indoor exhibits and workspaces. In 2011, the museum became home to 23 of artist Jim Gary's Twentieth Century Dinosaur sculptures, with the sculptures being scattered across the grounds.

== Sources ==
- Tallahassee Museum - official site
