= Senyah, Florida =

Senyah
- Unincorporated community
- Location within Volusia County
- Coordinates: 29°20′25″N 81°29′32″W
- Country: United States
- State: Florida
- County: Volusia
- Elevation: 59 ft (18 m)
- Time zone: UTC-5 (Eastern (EST))
  - Summer (DST): UTC-4 (EDT)
- enter ZIP code: 32190
- Area code: 386
- GNIS feature ID: 301665

Senyah is an unincorporated community located in north Volusia County, Florida, United States. Its name is Haynes spelled backwards. Haynes was the developer's last name.
