= Retsil, Washington =

Unincorporated community in Washington, United States

Retsil
- Unincorporated community
- Location within the state of Washington
- Coordinates: 47°32′45″N 122°36′40″W
- Country: United States
- State: Washington
- County: Kitsap
- Time zone: UTC-8 (Pacific (PST))
  - Summer (DST): UTC-7 (PDT)
- GNIS feature ID: 1531706

Retsil is an unincorporated community in Kitsap County, Washington, United States. It is located on the Puget Sound, and is known for its veterans facilities. Retsil is located within the Parkwood Census-designated place (CDP).

A post office called Retsil was established in 1915, and remained in operation until 1966. The community's name is that of Governor Ernest Lister, reversed.

== See also ==
- List of geographic anagrams and anadromes
