= Lambert, Oklahoma =

Town in Oklahoma, US

- Town
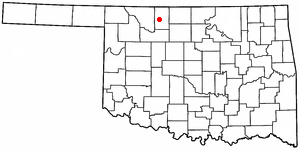
- Location of Lambert, Oklahoma
- Coordinates: 36°41′00″N 98°25′25″W
- Country: United States
- State: Oklahoma
- County: Alfalfa

Area
  - Total: 0.11 sq mi (0.29 km^{2})
  - Land: 0.11 sq mi (0.29 km^{2})
  - Water: 0 sq mi (0.00 km^{2})
- Elevation: 1,276 ft (389 m)

Population (2020)
  - Total: 5
  - Density: 45/sq mi (17.2/km^{2})
- Time zone: UTC-6 (Central (CST))
  - Summer (DST): UTC-5 (CDT)
- FIPS code: 40-41300
- GNIS feature ID: 2412873

Lambert is a town in Alfalfa County, Oklahoma, United States. The population was 5 at the time of the 2020 Census.

== History ==
The town of Lambert was named after Ambrose Lambert, who owned the original townsite. Lambert is contiguous to the similar small community of Yewed directly to its east. Part of the area known as the Cherokee Outlet, Lambert was originally part of Woods County after 1893 until the time of statehood in 1907, when the area became part of newly formed Alfalfa County.

The Choctaw Northern Railroad (later owned by the Chicago, Rock Island and Pacific ), which in 1901 became the county's first railroad, connected Lambert to the other Alfalfa county towns of Aline, Augusta, Ingersoll, Driftwood, Amorita, and on into Kansas. Lambert had a U.S. Post Office beginning in November 21, 1901 and remaining open until April 30, 1952.

By 1909, Lambert had 127 inhabitants and four churches, a hotel, a bank, an elevator, and two grain buyers. In addition, a half-dozen stores served the local community. Its population peaked in 1920 at 130, having since declined over the decades to the population of five reported in the 2020 Census.

Lambert's Farmers' Bank had the peculiar distinction of having been robbed twice, first in 1904 and then again in 1919.

== Geography ==
According to the United States Census Bureau, the town has a total area of 0.1 square miles (0.26 km^{2}), all land.

Lambert is not served by the Oklahoma state highway system.

== Demographics ==
Historical population
Census	Pop.	Note	%±
1910	127		—
1920	130		2.4%
1930	116		−10.8%
1940	99		−14.7%
1950	55		−44.4%
1960	21		−61.8%
1970	16		−23.8%
1980	20		25.0%
1990	11		−45.0%
2000	9		−18.2%
2010	6		−33.3%
2020	5		−16.7%
U.S. Decennial Census

=== 2020 census ===
As of the 2020 census, Lambert had a population of 5. The median age was 65.5 years. 20.0% of residents were under the age of 18 and 60.0% of residents were 65 years of age or older. For every 100 females there were 66.7 males, and for every 100 females age 18 and over there were 33.3 males age 18 and over.

0.0% of residents lived in urban areas, while 100.0% lived in rural areas.

There were 0 households in Lambert. No households had children under the age of 18. There were no households headed by a single male or single female householder. There were no one-person households, including anyone living alone who was 65 years of age or older.

There were 6 housing units, of which 100.0% were vacant. The homeowner vacancy rate was 100.0% and the rental vacancy rate was 100.0%.

Racial composition as of the 2020 census
Race	Number	Percent
White	4	80.0%
Black or African American	0	0.0%
American Indian and Alaska Native	0	0.0%
Asian	0	0.0%
Native Hawaiian and Other Pacific Islander	0	0.0%
Some other race	0	0.0%
Two or more races	1	20.0%
Hispanic or Latino (of any race)	0	0.0%

=== 2000 census ===
The median income for a household in the town was $31,250, and the median income for a family was $31,250. Males had a median income of $23,750 versus $0 for females. The per capita income for the town was $16,144. None of the population and none of the families were below the poverty line.

== Notable people ==
- Harold Keith, Newbery Medal-winning author (1958), Oklahoma Sports Hall of Fame inductee (1987), University of Oklahoma sports director, was born in Lambert.
