= Catherine Willis Gray =

American socialite and preservationist (1803–1867)

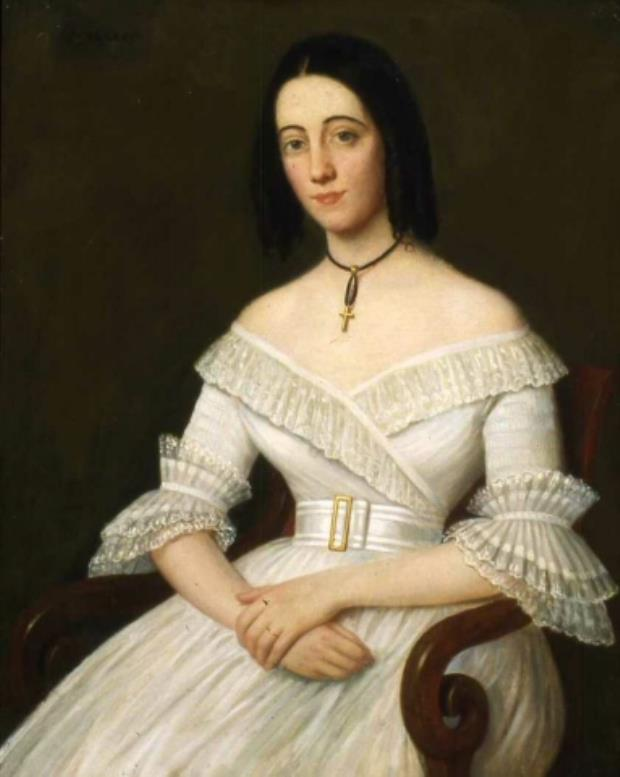
- Portrait by Jacques Amans, 1837
- Born: Catherine Daingerfield Willis; August 17, 1803; Fredericksburg City, Virginia, U.S.
- Died: August 6, 1867 (aged 63); Bellevue Plantation, Tallahassee, Florida, U.S.
- Spouses: Atchison Gray (m. 1818; died 1819) Prince Achille Murat (m. 1826; died 1847)
- Parent(s): Byrd C. Willis; Mary Lewis Willis

Catherine Daingerfield Willis Gray Murat (August 17, 1803 – August 6, 1867) was an American socialite and preservationist. In 1858, she was appointed the first vice regent for Florida by the Mount Vernon Ladies' Association. Together with Ellen Call Long, she raised significant funds for the acquisition and restoration of Mount Vernon. Catherine Murat was the great-grandniece of George Washington and was married to the former heir of the Kingdom of Naples, Prince Achille Murat.

== Early life ==
Catherine was born in Fredericksburg City, Virginia, on August 17, 1803. She was a daughter of Colonel Byrd Charles Willis (1781–1846) and his wife Mary (née Lewis) Willis (1782–1834), the granddaughter of Fielding Lewis, George Washington's brother-in-law. Through the Lewis family, she was also a relative of explorer Meriwether Lewis.

Her parents made their first home in Orange near the Court House. Later they came to Willis Hill. Col. Willis paid little attention to the management of the plantation and instead spent his time fox hunting, racing, and attending parties. Income was derived from the race profits and the sale of fire wood.

Catherine's first husband, Atchison Gray, died less than a year after their marriage. She moved with her parents to Florida, and in 1826 she married Achille Murat.

== Preservation ==
Catherine Murat became involved in the nation's first successful historic preservation project, the work to preserve George Washington's home. In 1858 she was appointed the first Vice Regent for Florida for the Mount Vernon Ladies' Association. Vice Regent was the title given the principal person in each state in charge of organizing the association's work. Working closely with Ellen Call Long, she led the efforts as the state raised $3,791 toward the restoration of Mount Vernon, the largest per capita amount raised by any of the 30 contributing states. Murat served in that post until her death. Despite her staunch Unionism, she was named master of ceremonies during the celebrations of the Florida Secession Convention in 1861. Later, during the American Civil War, Murat participated in the local "Soldiers Aid Societies," who met as sewing circles to clothe the southern troops.

== Personal life ==
Catherine married Atchison Gray (1800–1819), son of John Gray, Esquire, of Port Royal, Virginia, owner of Traveller's Rest, West Virginia and Wakefield, Virginia, and whose family comes from Gartcraig, Scotland, and came to America in 1784. Atchison died of malaria at Wakefield within a few months of his wedding, and is buried in the Gray family cemetery at Travellers' Rest. Their child, born after his death, died also.

=== Second marriage ===
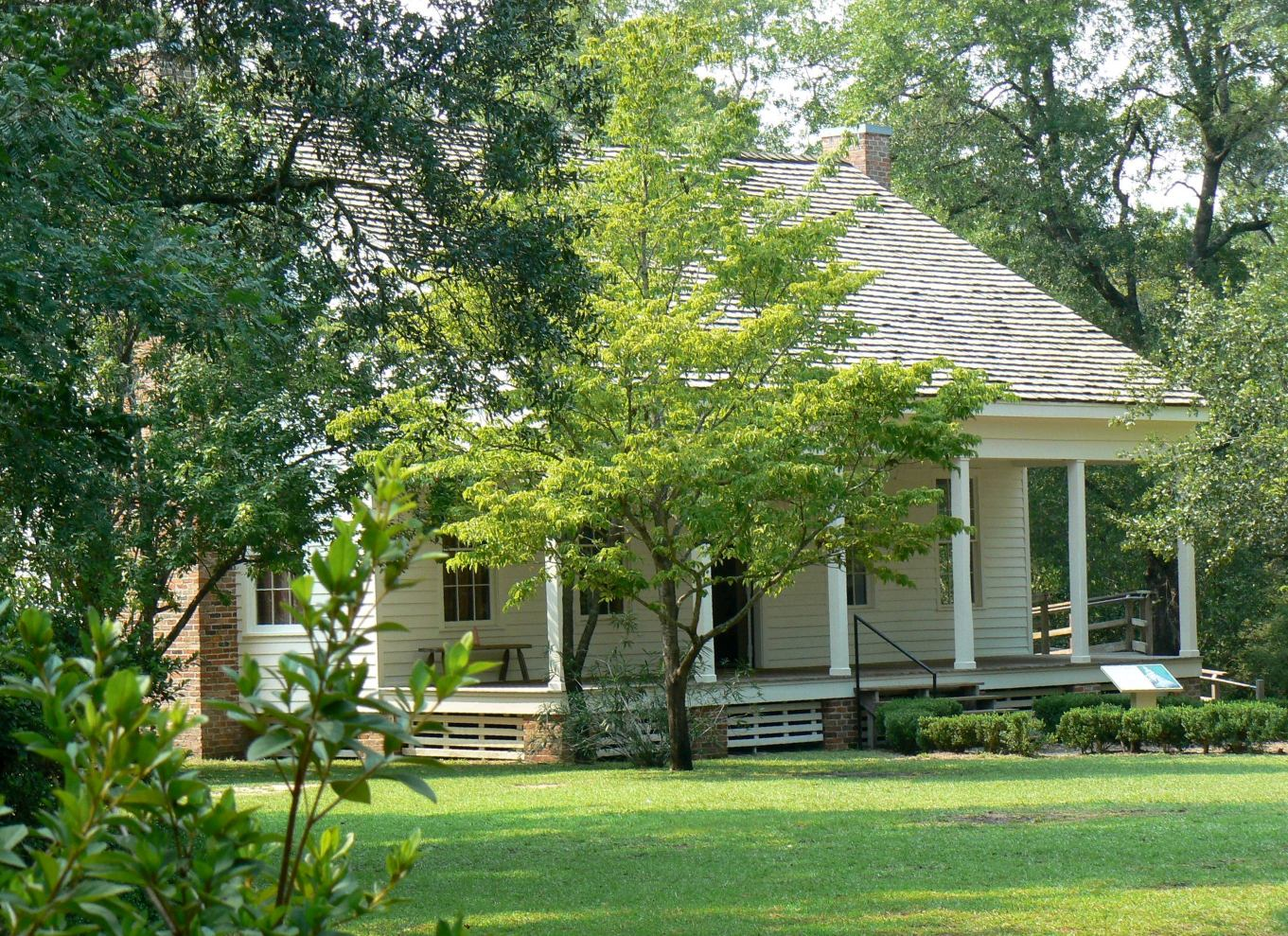
Bellevue in 2007, now an exhibit at the Tallahassee Museum.

About 1825, Catherine came to Tallahassee with her parents, three brothers and two sisters. She met Prince Charles Louis Napoleon Achille Murat, who became her second husband in 1826. He was a son of Joachim Murat, former King of Naples and Caroline Bonaparte. His maternal uncles included Joseph Bonaparte, Napoleon I of France, Lucien Bonaparte, Louis Bonaparte and Jérôme Bonaparte. His maternal aunts included Elisa Bonaparte and Pauline Bonaparte.

On 8 September 1831, Catherine was present at the coronation of William IV of the United Kingdom and was given a seat in Westminster Abbey.

In 1847, she inherited the 2,000-acre (8.1 km^{2}) Lipona Plantation in Jefferson County, Florida, upon the death of her husband. In 1854 she bought Bellevue, in Leon County, which became her primary residence.

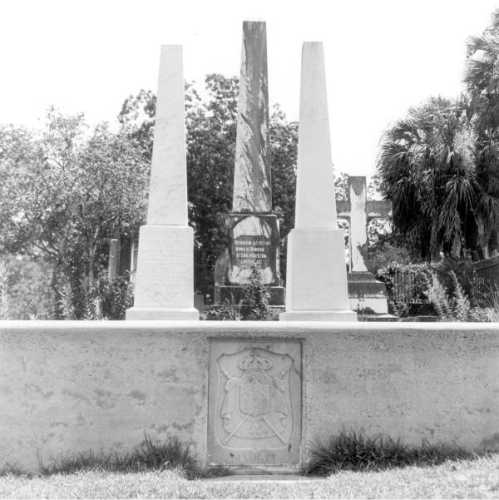
Graves of Achille and Catherine Murat.

Early in 1866, Napoleon III of France, a maternal first cousin of her husband, granted Murat an annuity from the French government in consideration of her losses during the Civil War. Catherine Murat died August 6, 1867, at Bellevue in Tallahassee.

=== Legacy ===
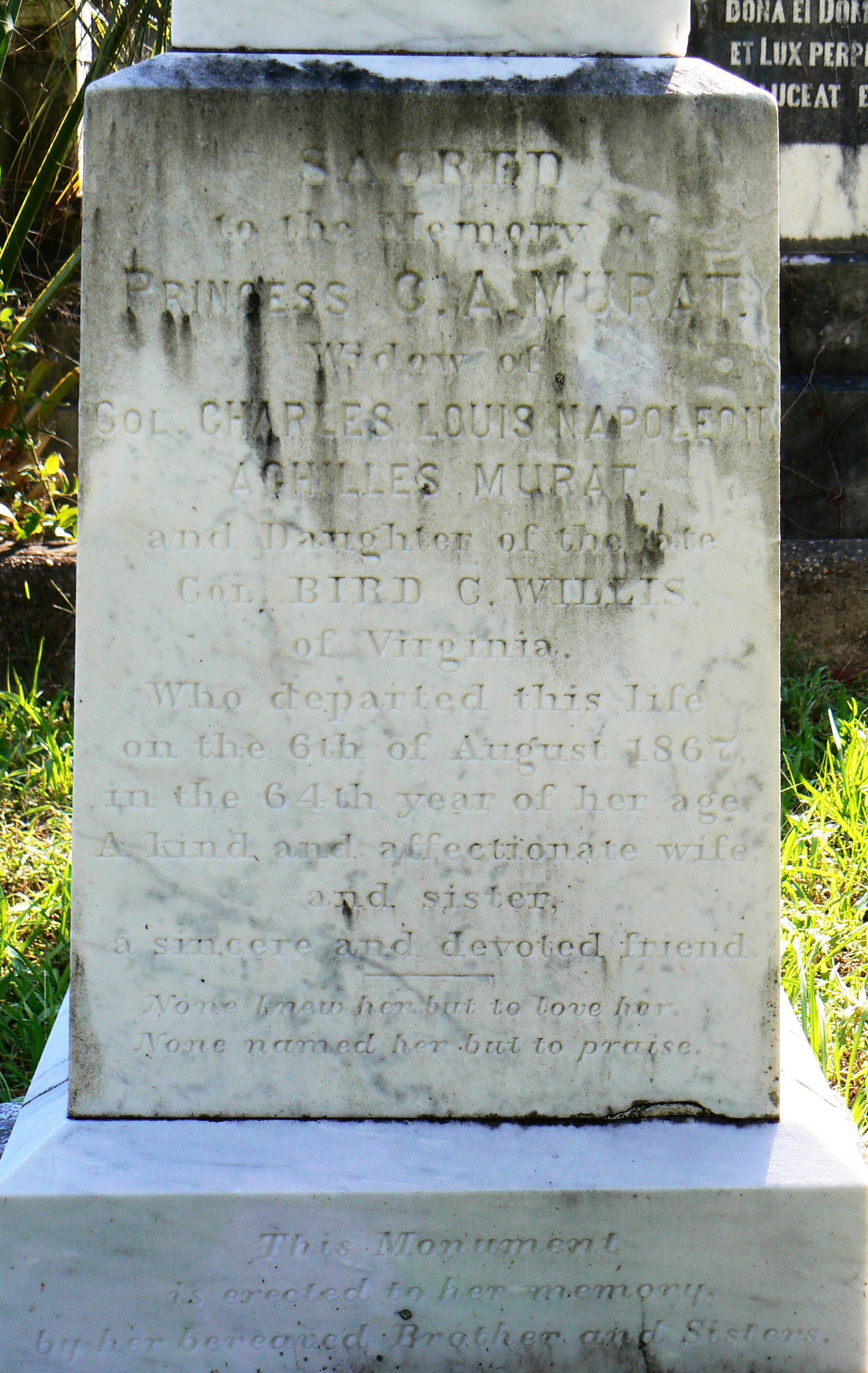
Grave marker of Catherine Murat.

Murat's marker in the old Tallahassee Episcopal Cemetery reads:

"SACRED to the Memory of PRINCESS C. A. MURAT, Widow of COL. CHARLES LOUIS NAPOLEON ACHILLES MURAT, and Daughter of the late COL. BIRD C. WILLIS, of Virginia. Who departed this life on 6 August 1867, in the 64th year of her age. A kind and affectionate wife and sister, a sincere and devoted friend. None knew her but to love her. None named her but to praise. This Monument is erected to her memory, by her bereaved Brother and Sister."
