= Catherine Davies (governess) =

Welsh governess to Naples

- Born: 1773; Beaumaris
- Died: after 1841; Wales
- Occupation: governess
- Employer: Caroline Bonaparte
- Known for: her autobiography of her time as governess to the children of the King and Queen of Naples.

Catherine Davies (1773 – after 1841), was a Welsh governess and autobiographer. She served as governess to the children of the King and Queen of Naples, Joachim Murat and Caroline Bonaparte. Davies later sold her story in a book in 1841.

== Life ==
Davies was born in Beaumaris, Wales, in 1773. In her memoirs, she claimed that her father was married twice and had thirty-three children. The family was poor, and she was brought up by a foster family in Liverpool until she left to live with her sister, who was married to an artist in London. After the Peace of Amiens in 1802, she left for Paris in France, employed in the household of an English woman, a Mrs Boyd. Some months later, when the hostilities between Great Britain and France was resumed, the English family with whom she was employed was kept in France as enemy citizens. They cut down on their expenses, and therefore secured new positions for their staff.

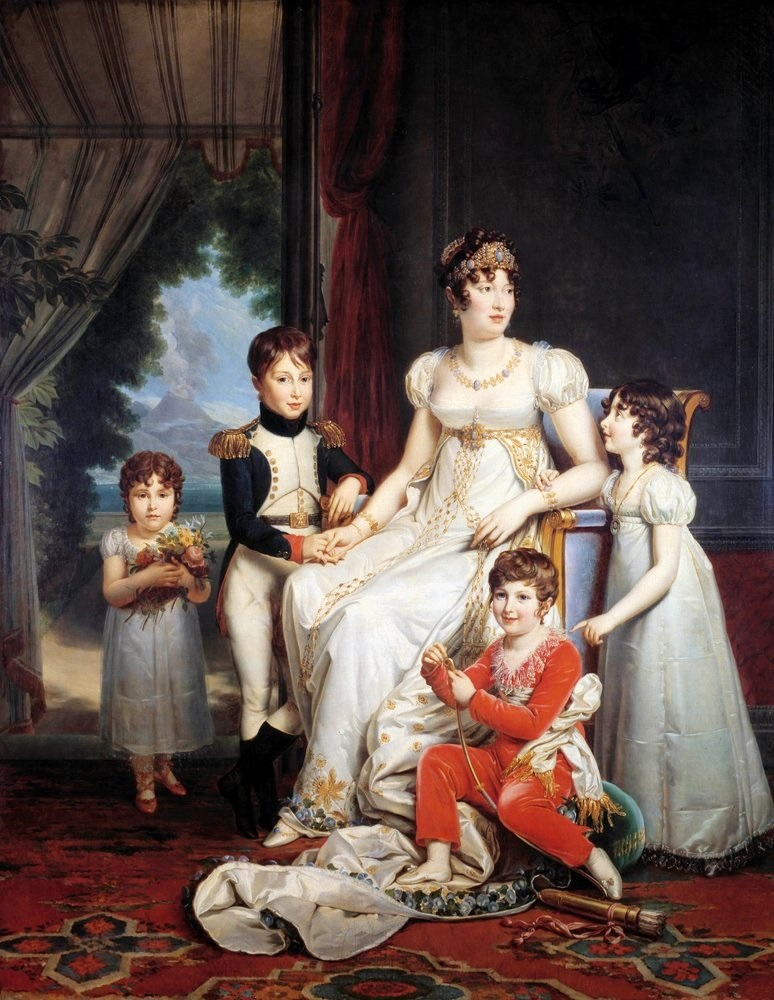
Queen Caroline and her children

=== Paris ===
Catherine Davies was employed by Caroline Bonaparte, the younger sister of Napoleon Bonaparte, who had expressed a wish to have English people employed to look after her children. During the following years, as the employee in the household of Napoleon's sister, she stated that witnessed many historical events. She met Napoleon at least once. He did not like the fact that his sister had two "English" women employed because of the risk that they would act a spies. Davies reports that Napoleon asked her if she liked the French as well as the English. When she replied that she would be a hypocrite if she said that she did, but that she liked all people who were kind to her, he answered that he liked her because of her honesty.

=== Naples ===
In 1808, Caroline and her spouse were appointed to be the Queen and King of Naples, and Davies continued in their employ; first engaged to look after their son, Prince Achille Murat, she was reassigned to look after princess Louisa when Achille reached the age of seven. It is from this year onward that Davies's story focus. In her autobiography Davies says that she did not publish an account of her life in Paris before 1808, as others had described the events of Parisian life during those years so well.

Davies was employed in Naples under the Head Governess, who was the Duchess de Rochino, assisted by the second governess, Countess Picherno, a niece of Lord Byron, and Madame Finier. Davies did not speak Italian but could converse in French, and the household also provided for her to have a companion, a Mrs Pulsford. Davies was well liked by Caroline, and during her later years of employ, the queen offered her the position of lady in waiting, but Davies declined because of the late hours kept by the queen. When the future Queen Caroline of Great Britain visited the Murats in 1814, she befriended Davies who, along with Pulsford, had been asked by the queen to prepare a perfect English tea for the princess of Wales. This was not expected but Caroline did not always act as she was advised. Davies was invited to the Princess's residence where her Abbe Taylor conducted services for her. During the period of peace between Great Britain and Naples, Davies and Pulsford were at one occasion allowed to visit a British ship in the harbour, during this visit a midshipman observed Davies, before asking if she "was not a native of Wales?" Davies was surprised at being so easily identified as Welsh but that her affirmative reply made "Pleasure beam in his countenance." the midshipmen said that he too was Welsh and Davies notes that the two "became from this moment, intimate friends". Davies and Pulsford were also given permission to return the visit by showing the royal palace to some of the British ship's crew.

During the Hundred Days of 1815, queen Caroline had her children and their tutors, including Davies, evacuated to Gaeta with her mother, should Naples be invaded. They left in such a haste that Davies was forced to leave behind most of the valuables she had accumulated during her stay in Naples. The party remained in place remained during the bombardment of Gaeta, during which she were obliged to seek shelter in a cave under the fortress. The damp conditions in the cave permanently damaged Davies' health. When the Kingdom of Naples was captured by the allies, queen Caroline was exiled and transported to Austrian custody in Trieste. On the way, the British fleet escorting Caroline went by way of Gaeta and picked up the party there. In Trieste, the British captain Campbell offered to escort Davies and Pulsford to England, but Caroline stated that she wished to keep them in her employ. When Caroline was ordered to leave for Vienna, however, Davies was unable to accompany them due to her health still being damaged by the period in Gaeta. Catherine Davies instead returned to Naples to visit the health spring in Ischia on doctor's orders. This did not improve her health, and she returned to England in 1816.

=== Later life ===
Catherine Davies had returned to settle in Wales in 1818. Her health condition apparently never improved, and she seem to have been supported by wealthy benefactors, such as Lord and Lady Bulkeley. Her knowledge of the Princess of Wales meant that when Queen Caroline was put on trial in 1820 for adultery, Davies was scheduled to appear in court. Davies was never called to give evidence. She did, however, recount her knowledge to a lawyer, who wrote it down.

In 1841 Davies published her book Eleven Years' Residence in the Family of Murat, King of Naples was published with a foreword by Achille Murat. The book was published expressively to benefit her economy, as she was poor by the time of its publication. Her life after this event is unknown, but she is presumed to have died shortly after 1841.
