= Bill J. Dukes =

American politician (1927–2014)

Bill J. Dukes

Bill J. Dukes (February 26, 1927 – December 18, 2014) was an American politician from Decatur, Alabama.

Born in Tarma, Kentucky, Dukes served in the United States Army. He then received his bachelor's degree from Bowling Green College of Commerce. He was an office manager, assistant to the Mayor of Decatur, Alabama. Dukes served on the Decatur City Council in 1968 and then served as Mayor of Decatur from 1976 until 1994. He received 75% or more in every election he ran in for both mayor and state representative. From 1994 until 2010, he served in the Alabama House of Representatives. Dukes died in Decatur, Alabama of Parkinson disease.
