= Yewed, Oklahoma =

Unincorporated community in Oklahoma, US

- Unincorporated community
- Location within Oklahoma Location within the United States
- Coordinates: 36°40′56″N 98°24′36″W
- Country: United States
- State: Oklahoma
- County: Alfalfa
- Established: 1902
- Elevation: 1,253 ft (382 m)

Population (1970)
  - Total: 2
- Time zone: UTC-6 (Central (CST))
  - Summer (DST): UTC-5 (CDT)
- Area code: 580
- GNIS feature ID: 1100954

Yewed is an unincorporated community in Alfalfa County, Oklahoma, United States. Yewed is 0.7 miles (1.1 km) east of Lambert.

== History ==
Yewed was platted in 1902 and had a station on the Kansas City, Mexico and Orient Railway. The community applied for a Post Office under the name Dewey in honor of Admiral George Dewey. However, since another community - Dewey, Oklahoma - already had that name, the letters were reversed and the name Yewed was assigned to the community. The Post Office operated from December 24, 1898, to April 30, 1952.

As of 1977, the community had an operational grain elevator and a population of two.

== See also ==
- List of geographic names derived from anagrams and ananyms
