= Nonnell, Kentucky =

Unincorporated community in Kentucky, United States

- Unincorporated community
- Location within Kentucky Location within the United States
- Coordinates: 37°14′14″N 87°3′34″W
- Country: United States
- State: Kentucky
- County: Muhlenberg
- Elevation: 436 ft (133 m)
- Time zone: UTC-6 (Central (CST))
  - Summer (DST): UTC-5 (CST)
- GNIS feature ID: 508717

Nonnell (/ˈnɒnɪl/) is an unincorporated community located in Muhlenberg County, Kentucky, United States.

== History ==
Nonnell was originally named Elk Valley. The community was renamed for John Lennon who was a maintenance supervisor for the Louisville and Nashville Railroad with his surname being reversed. From 1916 to 1931, the post office was known as Tarma for unknown reasons.

== Notable people ==
- Bill J. Dukes, Alabama politician, was born in Nonnell in 1927, when the community was known as Tarma.

== See also ==
- List of geographic names derived from anagrams and ananyms
