= Neola, West Virginia =

- Unincorporated community
- Location within the state of West Virginia Neola (the United States)
- Coordinates: 37°57′57″N 80°7′48″W
- Country: United States
- State: West Virginia
- County: Greenbrier
- Time zone: UTC-5 (Eastern (EST))
  - Summer (DST): UTC-4 (EDT)
- ZIP codes: 24961, 24986

Neola is an unincorporated community in northeastern Greenbrier County, West Virginia, United States. It lies along West Virginia Route 92 north of the city of White Sulphur Springs. Its elevation is 2,037 feet (621 m).

The community's name is an anagram of Olean, New York, the native home of a local lumber dealer.

== Climate ==
The climate in this area is characterized by hot, humid summers and generally mild to cool winters. According to the Köppen Climate Classification system, Neola has a humid subtropical climate, abbreviated "Cfa" on climate maps.

== See also ==
- List of geographic names derived from anagrams and ananyms
