= Mahned, Mississippi =

- Unincorporated community
- Location within Mississippi Location within the United States
- Coordinates: 31°12′33″N 89°04′51″W
- Country: United States
- State: Mississippi
- County: Perry
- Elevation: 118 ft (36 m)
- Time zone: UTC-6 (Central (CST))
  - Summer (DST): UTC-5 (CDT)
- Area code: 601
- GNIS feature ID: 693868

Mahned, also known as Mixons Mill, is an unincorporated community located in Perry County, Mississippi.

== History ==
The community was founded by a Confederate officer, Captain Joe Denham, who had returned to his home in Perry County after the Siege of Vicksburg. He designated the settlement 'Mahned', which is the reverse spelling of his last name. Although the captain wanted to use Denham, a community in nearby Wayne County was already identified by that name.

Mahned is located on the former Illinois Central Railroad. It was formerly home to a school, several stores, two churches, and a sawmill. At one point, the Fain-Fagin Lumber Company ran the sawmill in Mahned. The Mahned Lumber Company operated facilities in Mahned.

A post office operated under the name Mahned from 1903 to 1923.

The Mahned Bridge, which is listed on the National Register of Historic Places, is located in Mahned.

== See also ==
- List of geographic names derived from anagrams and ananyms
