= Oliver Christianson =

American cartoonist

- Born: California, U.S.
- Areas: Cartoonist, Editor
- Pseudonym: Revilo
- Notable works: Hallmark Cards
- Awards: National Cartoonist Society Greeting Cards Divisional Award, 2001

Oliver Christianson, also known as Revilo ("Oliver", spelled backwards), is an American cartoonist who has worked with American Greetings, Hallmark Cards and Penthouse magazine, among others. Some of his illustrations have been collected into the books Talk to the Tail, Women of Substance and Funny Business.

== Biography ==
Christianson was born in southern California, on April 2, 1947, and was an illustration major at California State University, Long Beach. He served as a U.S. Navy corpsman during the Vietnam War, where he was stationed at Da Nang Naval Hospital.

== Awards ==
Christianson received the National Cartoonist Society Divisional Award for Greeting Cards in 2001, and a nomination for the same award in 2002.
