= Strebor =

Strebor Diecasting
- Formerly: Roberts Company (1926-1933)
- Founded: 1926; 99 years ago
- Defunct: 2003/2004
- Headquarters: Radcliffe, Lancashire, United Kingdom

Strebor Diecasting (the name comes from Roberts spelled backwards) was a die-casting company in Radcliffe, Lancashire which was founded in 1926 as the Roberts Company. In 1933 the name was changed to the Strebor Diecasting company. During WW2 it made war material, after the war it made metal toys, and eventually achieved widespread notice as makers of cylinder locks and locking devices for the motor trade during the 1960s and 1970s under the STREBOR and STRONIS trade names. Their locks were to be found on British cars such as the Mini. The company was finally dissolved in 2003/2004 following a period of rundown and some industrial relations problems.
