= Yellek, Ontario =

Coordinates: 46.34°N 79.579°W

Yellek is a community in the Canadian province of Ontario, located just west of North Bay on the north shore of Lake Nipissing in the unincorporated township of Commanda and part of the Nipissing First Nation Reserve No. 10, which also includes Duchesnay, Jocko Point, Garden Village and Beaucage. Now accessed only from Highway 17, the community was first established in 1915 by the Canadian Northern Railway as a rail siding. Being about midway from North Bay to Field, Yellek was the first passing track west of North Bay and was named for trainmaster R. J. Kelley ("Yellek" is Kelley spelled backwards). Yellek later became part of the Canadian National Railway Alderdale Subdivision. Rail service declined in the mid-20th century and was eliminated altogether in 1996.

== See also ==
- List of geographic names derived from anagrams and ananyms
- List of unincorporated communities in Ontario
