= Livic =

Imperial College London student newspaper

LIVIC ("civil" spelt backwards, hence a "reflection of Civil Engineering") is the newspaper of the Civil Engineering Society (CivSoc) at Imperial College London. It is a monthly, free, A4-sized paper established in 2004, edited by an elected committee member of the society. The newspaper has a typical circulation of 250.

In 2006, LIVIC launched 'livique', a one-off special printed for the International Trip to Paris. Similar spin-offs have included 'livek', prepared for the trip to Budapest in 2007 and 'livøc' for the 2008 trip to Copenhagen.

While not a notable student publication, LIVIC aims to highlight current Civil & Environmental Engineering concerns and complications to undergraduates who are likely to be contributing to the shaping of the built environment in the long-term, and is therefore an invaluable resource to them.

Articles from LIVIC were published online through the City and Guilds College Union's media website 'Live' in order to help expand its readership numbers and so it is accessible to all at any time. It could be found here: Livic at Live

The articles are now posted to the Imperial College Union's website which can be found here: LIVIC
