= Corrigan House =

Historic house in Florida, United States

- U.S. National Register of Historic Places
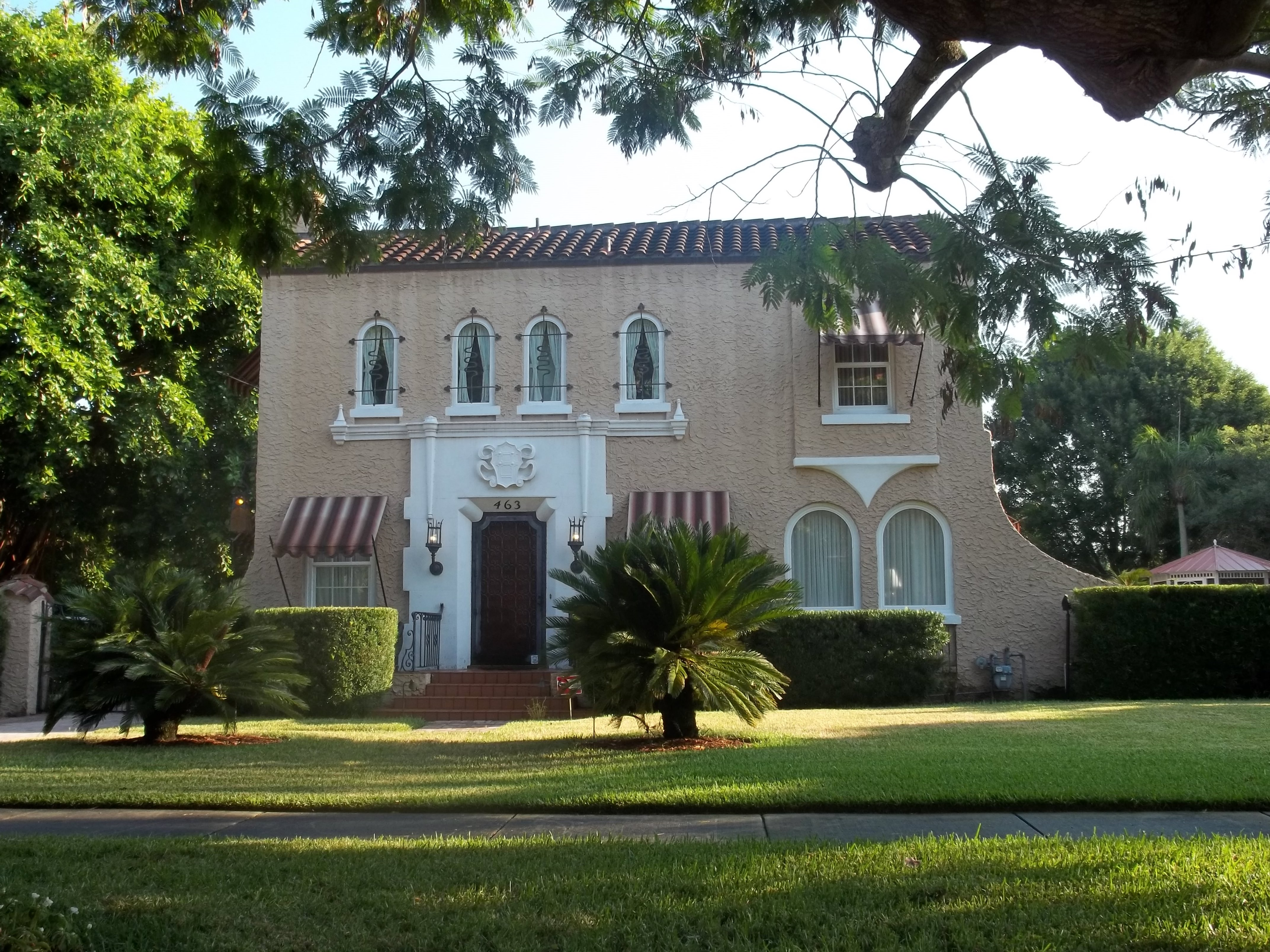

- Location within Florida Location within the United States
- Location: Sarasota, Florida
- Coordinates: 27°22′41″N 82°33′46″W
- Architectural style: Mission/Spanish Revival
- NRHP reference No.: 94000528
- Added to NRHP: May 26, 1994

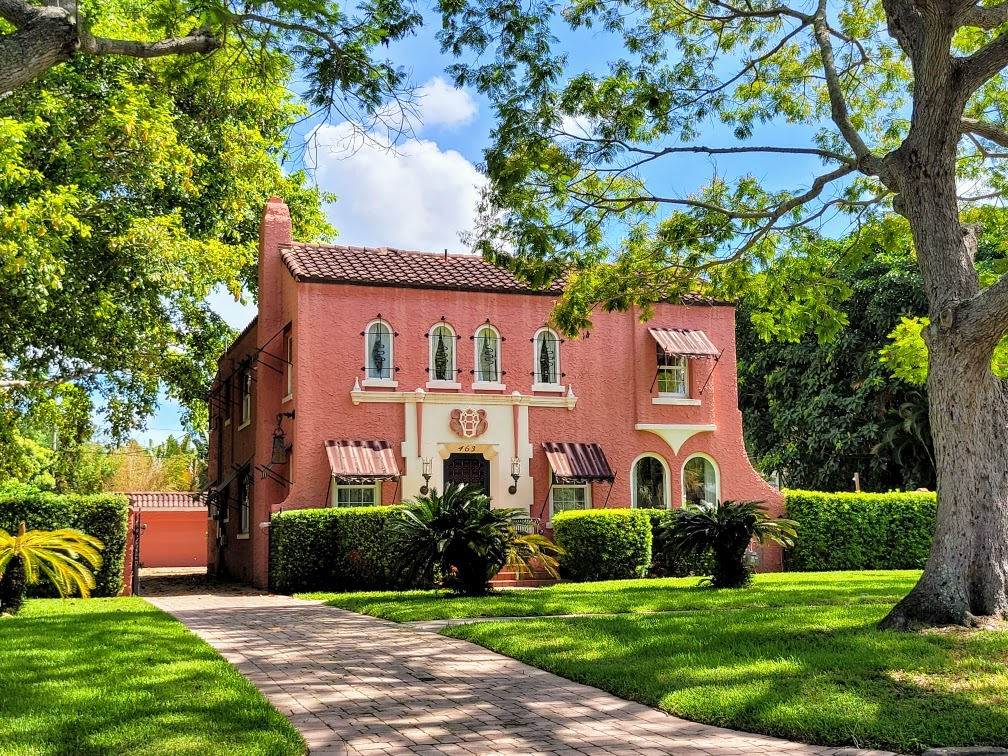
Corrigan House in 2022

The Corrigan House (also known as Nagirroc, which is Corrigan spelled backwards) is a historic home in Sarasota, Florida. It is located at 463 Sapphire Drive. On May 26, 1994, it was added to the U.S. National Register of Historic Places.

== References and external links ==
- Sarasota County listings at National Register of Historic Places
- Sarasota County listings at Florida's Office of Cultural and Historical Programs
