= Bellevue Plantation =

Historic house in Florida, United States

- U.S. National Register of Historic Places
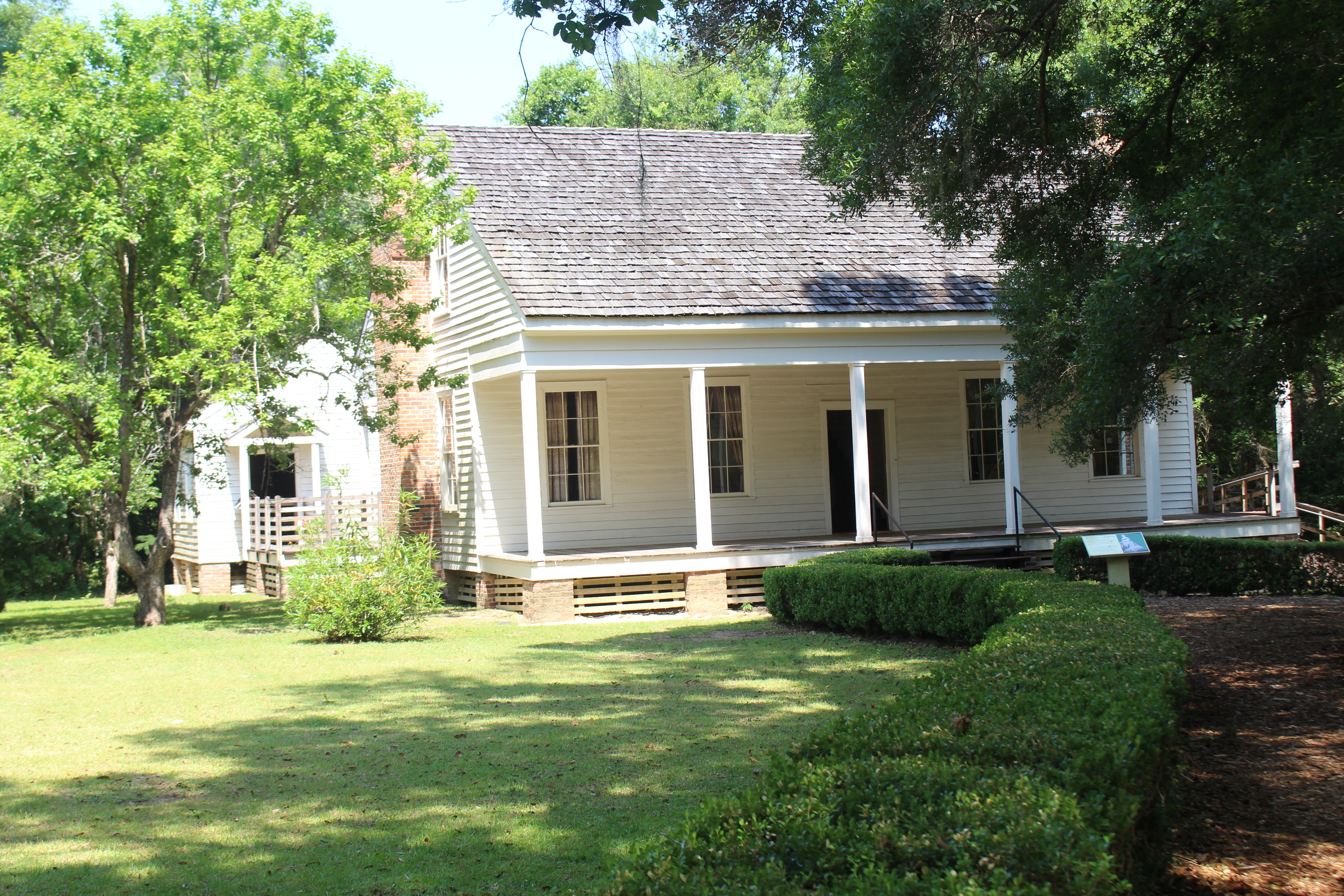
- Bellevue today, at the Tallahassee Museum
- Location: Leon County, Florida
- Nearest city: Tallahassee, Florida
- Coordinates: 30°24′45″N 84°20′41″W
- NRHP reference No.: 71000238
- Added to NRHP: March 11, 1971

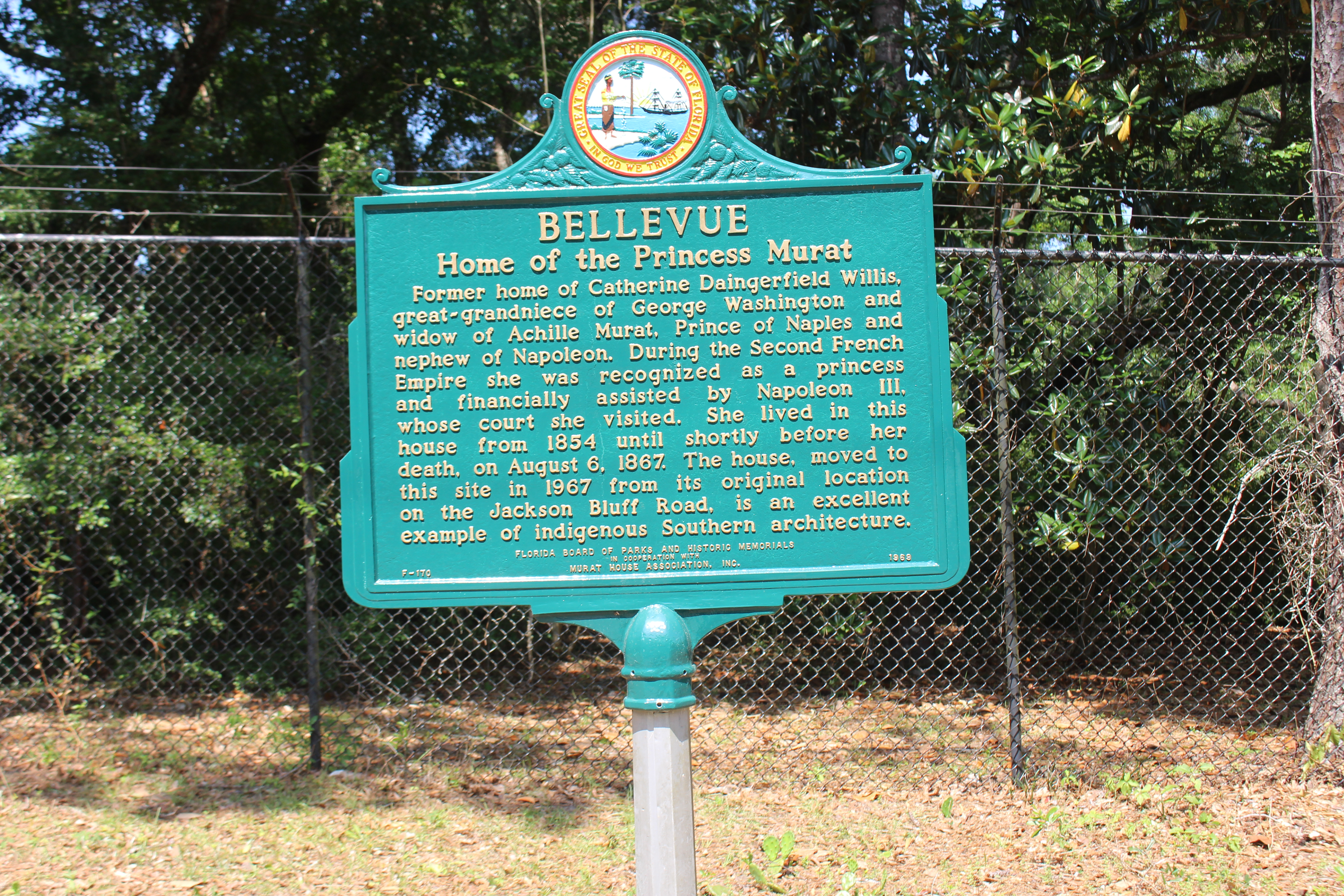
Historical marker

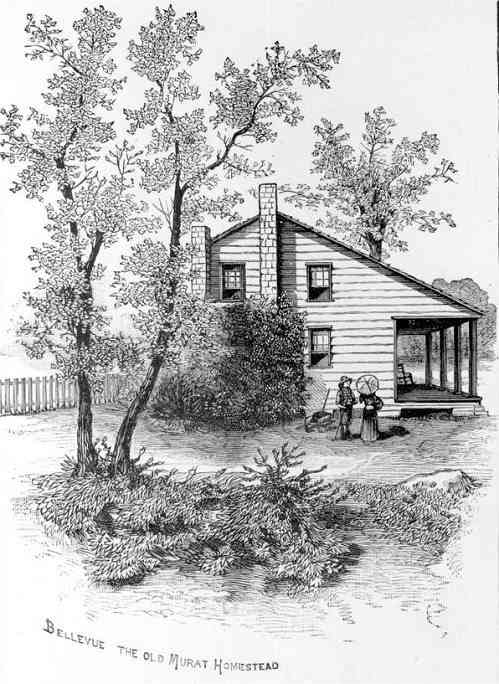
Engraving of Bellevue 1885

Bellevue Plantation was the U.S. home of Catherine Willis Gray Murat, located in Tallahassee, Florida. It was purchased in 1854 after Catherine's second husband Prince Achille Murat (son of Joachim Murat, Napoleon's brother-in-law and King of Naples from 1808 to 1815) died in 1847. Murat was the great-grandniece of George Washington. She was a daughter of Colonel Byrd C. Willis (August 29, 1781 – 1846) and his wife Mary Lewis. Mary Lewis was the granddaughter of Fielding Lewis, George Washington's brother-in-law. Through the Lewis family, she was also a relative of explorer Meriwether Lewis.

== Plantation home ==
The home was named after the Hotel de Belle-Vue in Brussels, where Catherine and Achille had lived while in Europe. It has been restored and has period furnishings.

The house is now part of the grounds of the Tallahassee Museum and is located in the Old Florida section. Visitors can learn about the area's plantation communities. There are two adjacent reconstructed buildings, a plantation kitchen and a cabin for enslaved farm workers.

== Plantation specifics ==
The Leon County Florida 1860 Agricultural Census shows that Bellevue Plantation had the following:

- Improved Land: 470 acres (190 ha)
- Unimproved Land: 50 acres (20 ha)
- Cash value of plantation: $10,000
- Cash value of farm implements/machinery: $200
- Cash value of farm animals: $510
- Number of enslaved humans: 24 (cash value immeasurable)
- Bushels of corn: N/A
- Bales of cotton: N/A

== The owners ==
During Catherine's years at Bellevue, she became involved in America's first successful preservation effort of Mount Vernon, George Washington's home, through the Mount Vernon Ladies' Association. She was appointed Vice Regent for Florida, the title given the central person in each state organizing the association's work. The state raised $3,791 toward the restoration of Mount Vernon, the largest per capita amount raised by any of the 30 contributing states. During the Civil War, Murat participated in the local "Soldiers Aid Societies," which met as sewing circles to clothe the southern troops. Early in 1866, Napoleon III, who had come to power in France in 1849, granted Murat an annuity from the French government in consideration of her losses during the Civil War. Catherine Murat died August 6, 1867, at Bellevue.

Bellevue was sold to Captain Bloxham who owned the William D. Bloxham Plantation. In June 1883, Bellevue, now at 357 acres (144 ha) of land, was sold to Edward Smeaton Thomson of Oshkosh, Wisconsin.
