= Natércia =

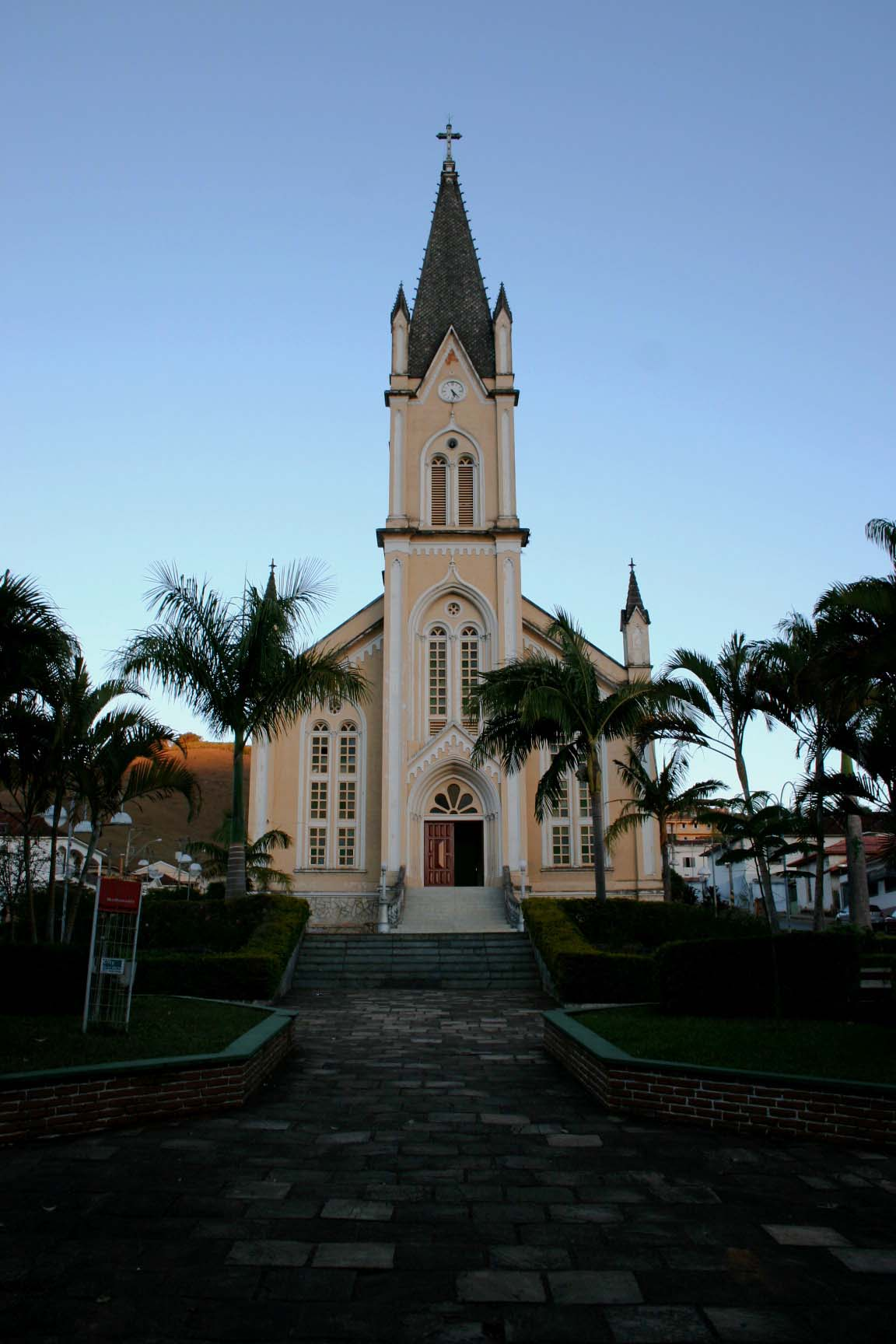
- Church of Santa Catarina de Alexandria

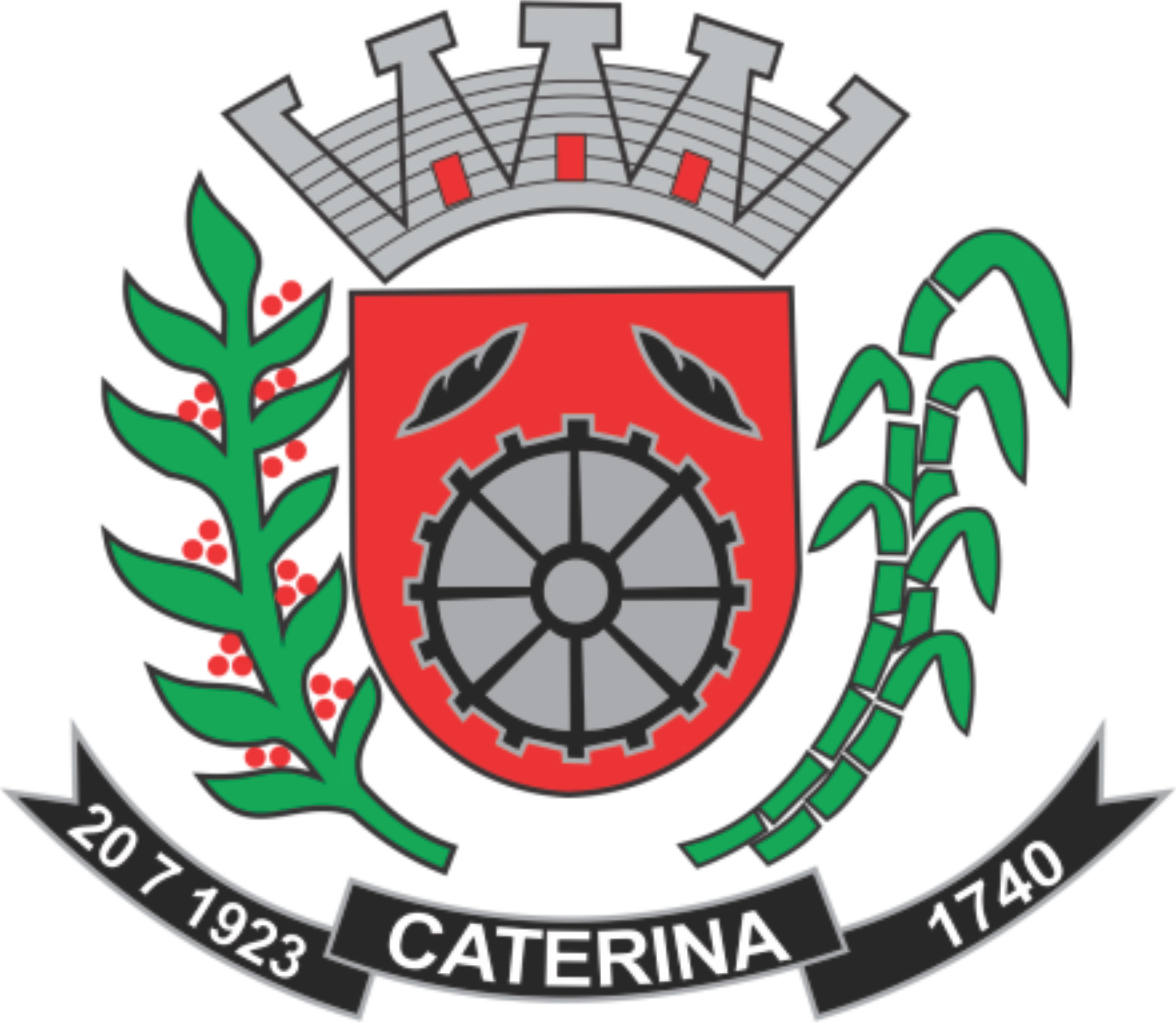
- Coat of arms

- Location in Brazil
- Coordinates: 22°07′12″S 45°30′43″W
- Country: Brazil
- Region: Southeast
- State: Minas Gerais
- Founded: 1743

Area
  - Total: 190,422 km^{2} (73,522 sq mi)

Population (2020)
  - Total: 4,728
- Time zone: UTC−3 (BRT)

Natércia is a municipality in southern Minas Gerais State, Brazil.

== See also ==
- List of municipalities in Minas Gerais
