= Lipona Plantation =

Coordinates: 30.4026°N 84.0228°W

Lipona Plantation was a forced-labor farm of 900 acres (3.6 km^{2}) in Jefferson County, Florida, United States established by Prince Achille Murat. The name is an anagram of Napoli, which Murat was the former prince of.

== Plantation Specifics ==
The Jefferson County Florida 1860 Agricultural Census shows that Lipona Plantation had the following:

- Improved Land: 550 acres (2.2 km^{2})
- Unimproved Land: 350 acres (1.4 km^{2})
- Cash value of plantation: $8600
- Cash value of farm implements/machinery: $800
- Cash value of farm animals: $1200
- Number of slaves: 80
- Bushels of corn: N/A
- Bales of cotton: N/A

== See also ==
- List of geographic names derived from anagrams and ananyms

== Sources ==
- 1860 Jefferson Co. Census
