= Ak-Sar-Ben =

Ak-Sar-Ben or Aksarben (Nebraska spelled backwards, /əɡˈzɑːrbən/ əg-ZAR-bən) may refer to:

- Knights of Ak-Sar-Ben, a philanthropic organization based in Omaha, Nebraska
- The Ak-Sar-Ben neighborhood of Omaha, Nebraska, also known as Elmwood Park
- Ak-Sar-Ben Aquarium, a former aquarium formerly located in Schramm Park State Recreation Area
- Ak-Sar-Ben (arena), an indoor arena and horse racing complex in Omaha, Nebraska that existed from 1920 to 1995
- Aksarben Village, a real estate development located on the site of the former Ak-Sar-Ben arena and racetrack
- The Ak-Sar-Ben (train), a train operated by the Chicago, Burlington and Quincy Railroad
- The Ak-Sar-Ben Zephyr, a train operated by the Chicago, Burlington and Quincy Railroad
- Ak-Sar-Ben Bridge, a bridge connecting Omaha, Nebraska and Council Bluffs, Iowa that stood from 1888 to 1966
- Omaha Ak-Sar-Ben Knights, a minor-league hockey team that played from 2005 to 2007
- Ak-Sar-Ben Amateur Radio Club, a club of licensed amateur radio operators in the Omaha area from 1945 to present
