= Adanac, Nipissing District, Ontario =

Canadian tourist cottage business

Coordinates: 46°57′50″N 80°00′20″W

Adanac is a family-run tourist cottage business on Lake Temagami in northeastern Ontario. Adanac is in the Town of Temagami, in the District of Nipissing. The name is derived from Canada, spelled backwards.
