= Achille Murat =

Eldest son of the King of Naples during the First French Empire

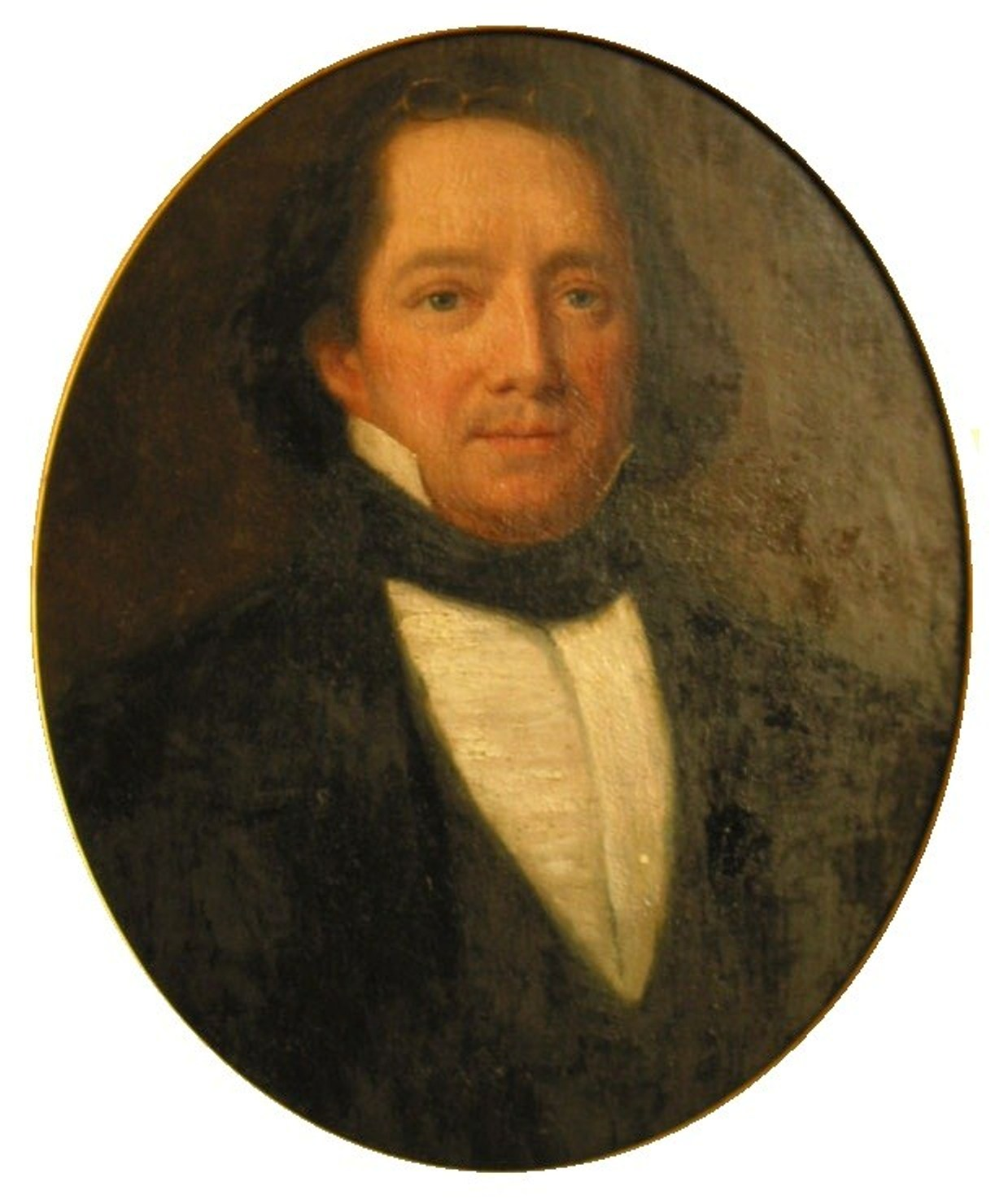
- Murat, c. 1835

Prince Murat
- Tenure: 13 October 1815 – 15 April 1847
- Predecessor: Prince Joachim
- Successor: Prince Lucien
- Born: 21 January 1801; Paris, France
- Died: 15 April 1847 (aged 46); Jefferson County, Florida, U.S.
- Spouse: Catherine Willis Gray (m. 1826)
- Father: Joachim Murat
- Mother: Caroline Bonaparte

Charles Louis Napoleon Achille Murat, known as Achille (French: [aʃil myʁa]; 21 January 1801 – 15 April 1847), was the eldest son of Joachim Murat, the brother-in-law of Napoleon who was appointed King of Naples during the First French Empire. After his father was deposed and executed by his own subjects, Achille Murat went into exile in the Austrian Empire with his siblings and mother.

At the age of 21, Achille Murat emigrated to the United States and settled at St. Augustine, Florida, becoming a naturalized citizen sometime after July 1828 and dropping his European titles.

== Biography ==
=== Early life ===
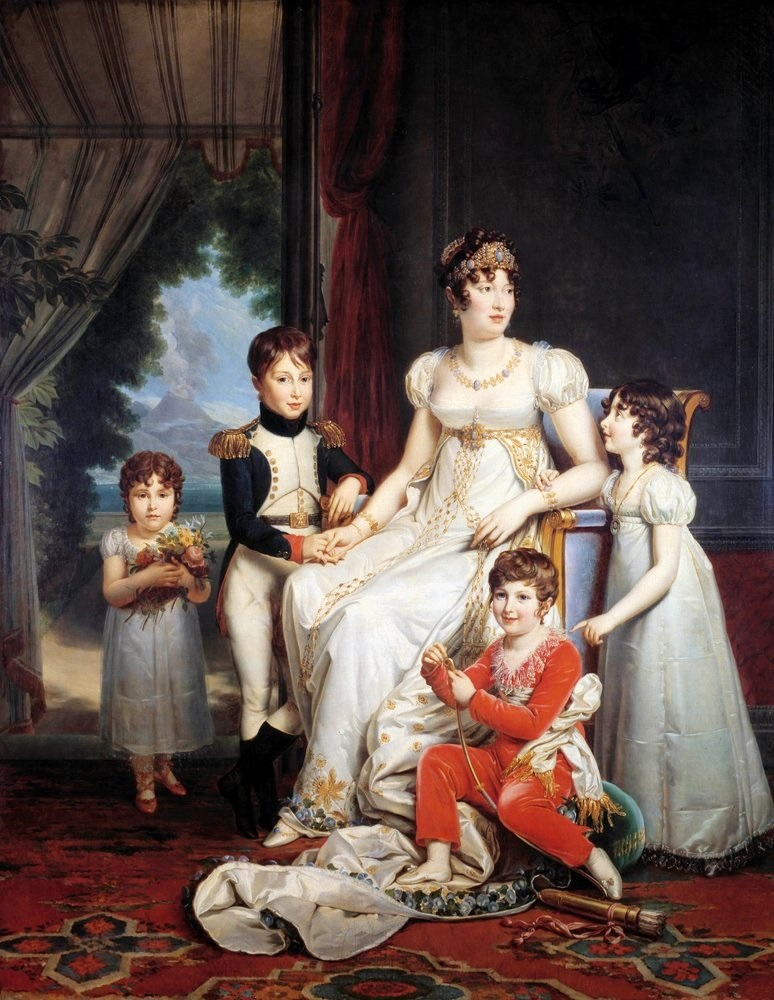
Achille (in uniform), with his brother, sisters and mother Caroline Bonaparte

Achille Murat was born in the Hôtel de Brienne in Paris, France. His father was Joachim Murat, the son of an affluent farmer and innkeeper, who became one of Napoleon's loyal followers. Joachim Murat was appointed Marshal of the Empire for his military service, and was later awarded royal positions by Napoleon under the First French Empire, including the throne of the Kingdom of Naples.

Achille's mother was Caroline Bonaparte, sister of Napoleon. She was styled Grand Duchess of Berg and Queen of Naples, while Achille was considered the crown prince.

Murat's governess was Catherine Davies from Anglesey in Wales. In 1841, she published a memoir describing her eleven years' service with the Murat family.

=== Exile in Austria and emigration to the United States ===
After Napoleon was exiled for a second time in 1815 on Saint Helena island in the middle of the southern Atlantic Ocean, Joachim Murat was deposed and executed by his subjects. Young Achille and his siblings were taken by their mother into exile at the Schloss Frohsdorf, near Vienna in Lower Austria. When Murat turned twenty-one, he obtained permission to emigrate to the United States.

In 1821 he embarked from a Spanish port bound for the United States. On arrival in New York, Murat immediately applied for naturalization. After a few months in that city he made an extensive tour through the United States, using an assumed name at first. He had a striking resemblance to his famous uncle in countenance and mannerisms. Although he had renounced all his European titles and citizenship, his wide social connections brought Murat to Washington, where he befriended Richard K. Call, the delegate of the Florida Territory's at-large congressional district to the United States House of Representatives.

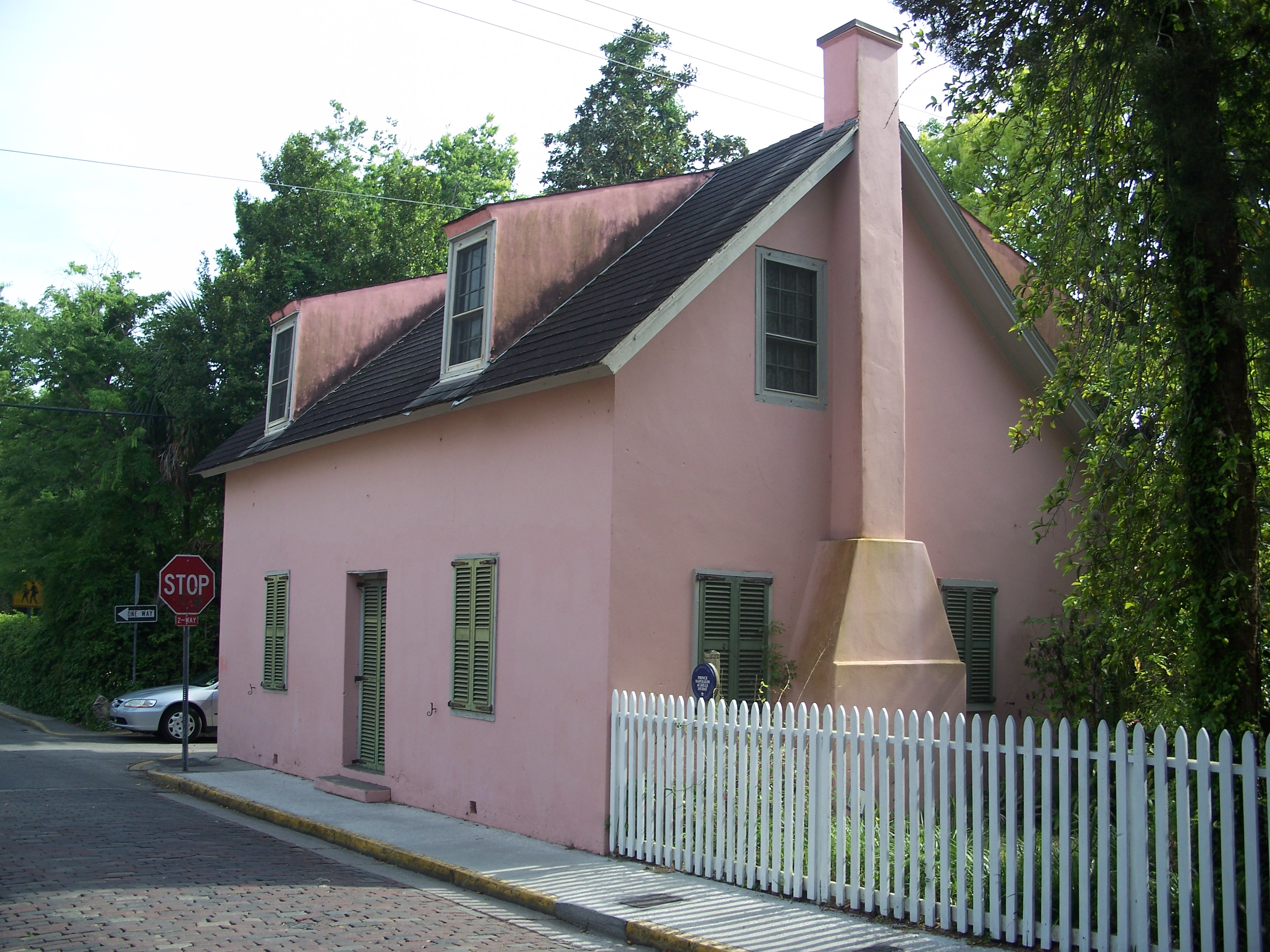
Murat's house in St. Augustine, Florida

=== On the Florida frontier ===
Call told Murat of opportunities in the new territory of Florida, which had been acquired by the United States from Spain in 1821. In the spring of 1824, the former "Prince of Naples" settled in St. Augustine, reputedly renting what is now called the Prince Murat House on St. George Street. Murat soon became active in St. Augustine society by joining the Masonic lodge and dabbling in local politics. He enrolled in the local militia and was briefly a volunteer under the command of his personal friend, Brig. Gen. Joseph Hernández.

In 1824, Moses Levy, a Moroccan-born planter and religious reformer, sold Murat his estate, "Matanzas", a 1,200 acres (490 ha) sugarcane plantation located at the confluence of Moses Creek and the Matanzas River, about 10 mi (16 km) south of St. Augustine, for $1,960. Murat developed the property using the labor of enslaved Black persons to grow oranges, sugar cane, cotton, and tobacco. He renamed it "Parthenope", in honor of his onetime principality in Naples, Italy, which had been founded on the site of the ancient Greek colony of Parthenope. Murat liked to go nude and made a submersible chair to escape the heat of the north Florida summers, using it to sit naked in the waters of Moses Creek with mosquito netting over his head. A neighbor observed that he was obsessed with the "...eatability of the whole animal tribe". Murat was known to have experimented with eating baked turkey buzzard, boiled owl, roasted crow, stewed alligator, lizards and rattlesnakes. He had an aversion to baths, did not like to change his clothes, "washed his feet only after he wore out his shoes", and slept on a mattress stuffed with Spanish moss.

Around 1825, Murat bought the land he would call Lipona Plantation, 15 miles (24 km) east of Tallahassee. He lived there during the remainder of Florida's territorial and early statehood days. The name Lipona is an anagram of "Napoli" (Naples), the kingdom where Murat once thought he would succeed his father. He purchased Lipona at the prodding of the Marquis de Lafayette, beneficiary of the Lafayette Land Grant of July 4, 1825, which had granted him (LaFayette) 36 square miles (93 km^{2}) of land near what would become the city of Tallahassee. Legend tells that the Marquis' agents arranged for a group of fifty or sixty Norman French farmers to settle on the land around 1831, but there is no documentation of this taking place.

Many authors have repeated claims that Murat was an elected alderman of Tallahassee in 1824, mayor in 1825, and its longest-serving postmaster (1826–1838). The public record and historical evidence do not support these assertions. This and other misinformation about Murat appeared as early as 1888 in Appletons' Cyclopædia of American Biography and was repeated in an 1890s tourists' "guide book" published by the Murat estate (i.e., Bellevue Plantation) that overstated Murat's involvement in local politics; the guide book is mentioned in Bradford Torrey's 1895 book entitled A Florida Sketch-Book, which recalls Torrey's 1893 visit to the Murat estate near Tallahassee. Torrey wrote that Catherine Murat's neighbor and another local "indisputable citizen"—a judge—refuted the Murat claims published in the tourist's guidebook. Because the original city charter for the city of Tallahassee was not in effect until December 9, 1825, and the first municipal election was not held until January 2, 1826, there was no city council in existence in 1824 or 1825; thus Murat could not have been an alderman or mayor in those years. Federal records show Isham G. Searcy as the federally appointed postmaster of Tallahassee for the period claimed in the Murat estate guide-book.

Murat met Catherine Daingerfield Willis Gray in 1826 and married her on July 12 of that year at Tallahassee, Florida. They did not have any children. Gray was the great-grandniece of George Washington.

Murat's political sympathies seem to have been Jacksonian throughout his time in Florida. At a political rally in 1826, he called one of the candidates, his neighbor David Betton Macomb, a "turncoat"; Macomb had led a toast to Kentucky statesman Henry Clay on at least one occasion that summer (an alternative version of the story has Macomb upset that Murat's slaves were stealing his hogs). Macomb and Murat met at a local dueling ground near Hiamones Lake. Murat's shot went through Macomb's shirt without touching flesh, and Macomb's took off half of the little finger of Murat's right hand.

During the early phase of the Second Seminole War, and for the previous three years, Murat served as a lieutenant-colonel in the Florida Militia and aide-de-camp to Call. He would retain the rank of lieutenant-colonel the rest of his life.

=== Friendship with Ralph Waldo Emerson ===
In the winter of 1826, during one of his periodic visits to St. Augustine, Murat met the American writer Ralph Waldo Emerson. The two became close friends and enjoyed discussing topics of the day as well as politics, society, and history. Of Murat, Emerson wrote:

A new event is added to the quiet history of my life. I have connected myself by friendship to a man ... with as ardent a love of truth as that which animates me, with a mind that surpasses mine in the variety of its research, & sharpened & strengthened to an energy for action to which I have no pretension by advantages of birth & practical connection with mankind beyond almost all men in the world.

Like his contemporary, Alexis de Tocqueville, Murat was one of the first notable essayists on culture and mores in the new republic of the United States. During his residence at his plantation near St. Augustine, Murat began to write his observations on American politics and his daily life in Florida in fluent French, Italian and English. He wrote on slavery, economics, and literature as well, but his books never caught on with the public. Murat was a staunch defender of slavery although he professed to fight for human liberty.

=== To Europe and back ===
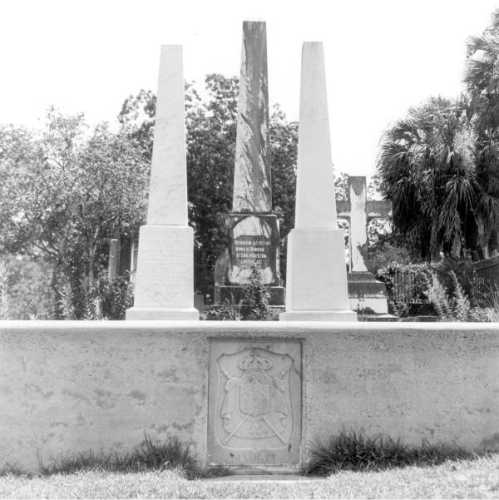
Graves of Achille and Catherine Murat, Tallahassee, Florida

Following the July Revolution of 1830 in France, Murat returned to Europe, where he was assigned to the command of a regiment of the Belgian Legion. While in Belgium and France, he hoped to regain some part of the family fortune, based on the properties of his parents. His attempts were futile, and in 1834 the Murats returned to the Tallahassee area.

In 1835, Murat and his wife moved to Louisiana, where he had purchased a sugarcane plantation outside New Orleans and a town house in the city. The couple lived there for several years while he practiced law without much success. After their return to Florida, Murat mortgaged the Lipona property to the Tallahassee Union Bank. He lost it in 1839 when he could no longer meet his financial obligations as a result of the delayed effects of the financial recession of 1837. He and his wife were forced to move to a smaller plantation they named Econchatti, in present-day Jefferson County, Florida. Murat died there in 1847, and was buried in the St. John's Episcopal Church cemetery in Tallahassee.

Murat's maternal first cousin, Emperor Napoleon III of France, provided his widow with a cash sum of $40,000 and an annual stipend so that she could live the life to which she had become accustomed. She proved to be a better handler of money than her husband had been, and purchased the Bellevue Plantation in 1854. She held court among her friends and admirers until after the Civil War. Catherine Murat died in 1867 and was also buried at the St. Johns Episcopal Church cemetery. In 1967, the Bellevue plantation house was moved to Tallahassee, where it has been made part of the Tallahassee Museum.

== Ancestry ==
Ancestors of Achille Murat

16. Pierre Murat
8. Guillaume Murat
17. Catherine Badourès
4. Pierre Murat-Jordy
18. Bertrand Herbeil
9. Marguerite Herbeil
19. Anne Roques
2. Joachim Murat, King of Naples
10. Pierre Loubières
5. Jeanne Loubières
11. Jeanne Viellescazes
1. Prince Achille Napoleon Murat
24. Sebastiano Nicola Buonaparte
12. Giuseppe Maria Buonaparte
25. Maria Anna Tusoli
6. Carlo Maria Buonaparte
26. Giuseppe Maria Paravisini
13. Maria Saveria Paravisini
27. Maria Angela Salineri
3. Caroline Bonaparte
28. Giovanni Agostino Ramolino
14. Giovanni Geronimo Ramolino
29. Angela Maria Peri
7. Maria Letizia Ramolino
30. Giuseppe Maria Pietrasanta
15. Angela Maria Pietrasanta
31. Maria Josephine Malerba

French royalty of a French client state
New title	Hereditary Prince of Berg; 1806–1808	Grand Duchy abolished in 1810
New title	Crown Prince of Naples; 1808–1815	Title abolished in 1816
French nobility of the First French Empire
Preceded by Joachim Murat	Prince Murat; 1815–1847	Succeeded by Lucien Murat
