= Michel Aloys Ney =

- Duke of Elchingen
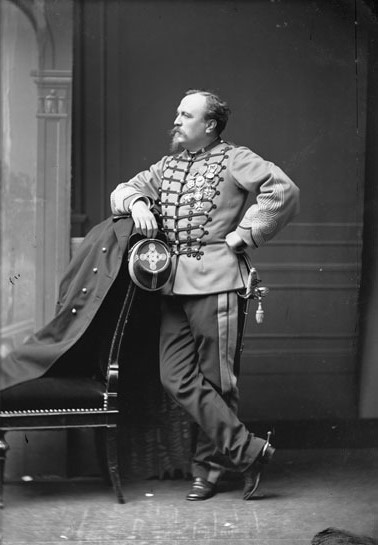
- Portrait by Pierre Petit, c. 1875
- Born: 3 May 1835; Paris, France
- Died: 23 February 1881 (aged 45); Fontenay-aux-Roses, France
- Spouse: Paule Marguerite Laure Juliette Furtado-Heine
- Issue: Cécile, Princess Murat; Marguerite Louise Ney; Napoléon, 4th Prince de la Moskowa; Rose, Duchess of Camastra; Charles, 5th Prince de la Moskowa; Violette, Princess Murat; Clotilde Ney
- Father: Michel Louis Félix Ney
- Mother: Marie Joséphine Souham

Michel Aloys Ney, 3rd Duke of Elchingen (3 May 1835 – 23 February 1881), was a French general.

== Early life ==
He was the only son of Michel Louis Félix Ney, 2nd Duke of Elchingen (1804–1854), and Marie Joséphine Souham. He had two sisters, Marie-Louise Hélène Ney d'Elchingen (who married Prince Nicolae Bibescu) and Hélène Louise Ney d'Elchingen.

His maternal grandparents were General Joseph Souham and Rosalie Desperiez. His paternal grandparents were Aglaé Auguié and Michel Ney, 1st Prince de la Moskowa, 1st Duke of Elchingen, who was made a peer of France in 1814. On his execution in 1815, the peerage was revoked, but it was restored in 1831. Clauses in the titles' patents of creation caused the title of Prince de la Moskowa to pass to Ney's eldest son (Michel's uncle), Napoléon Joseph Ney, and the title of Duke of Elchingen to pass to his second son (Michel's father), Michel.

== Career ==
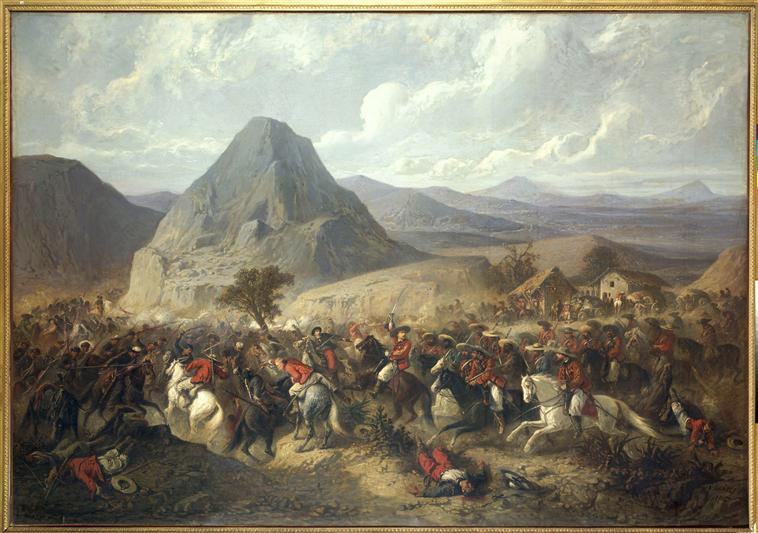
Battle of Hierba-Buena in 1865, by Jean-Adolphe Beaucé

In August 1852, he volunteered in the regiment of his uncle, Napoleon Joseph Ney, a few months after the death of his cousin of the same age. He served in the East, during the Crimean War in 1854, then in Algeria from 1855 to 1860, with a stint in Italy in 1859, again in Algeria then in Syria from 1859 to 1862. In 1861, he was officer in the chasseurs of the Imperial Guard. He participated in the Second French intervention in Mexico from 1862 to 1866, and finally in the Franco-Prussian War of 1870.

=== Dukedom of Elchingen ===
Upon the death of his father in 1854, the dukedom passed to Michel. Upon the death of his uncle Napoléon Joseph Ney in 1857, who died without surviving legitimate male issue, the princely title passed to another uncle, Edgar Ney, who became the 3rd Prince de la Moskowa. When he died without issue in 1882, the title reverted to Michel's branch of the family. Since Michel had died in 1881, his younger son Charles became the 4th Duke of Elchingen and his eldest son, Léon Napoléon Louis Michel Ney, became 4th Prince de la Moskowa. Upon his death in 1928, the titles were again united and held by his second son, Charles.

== Personal life ==
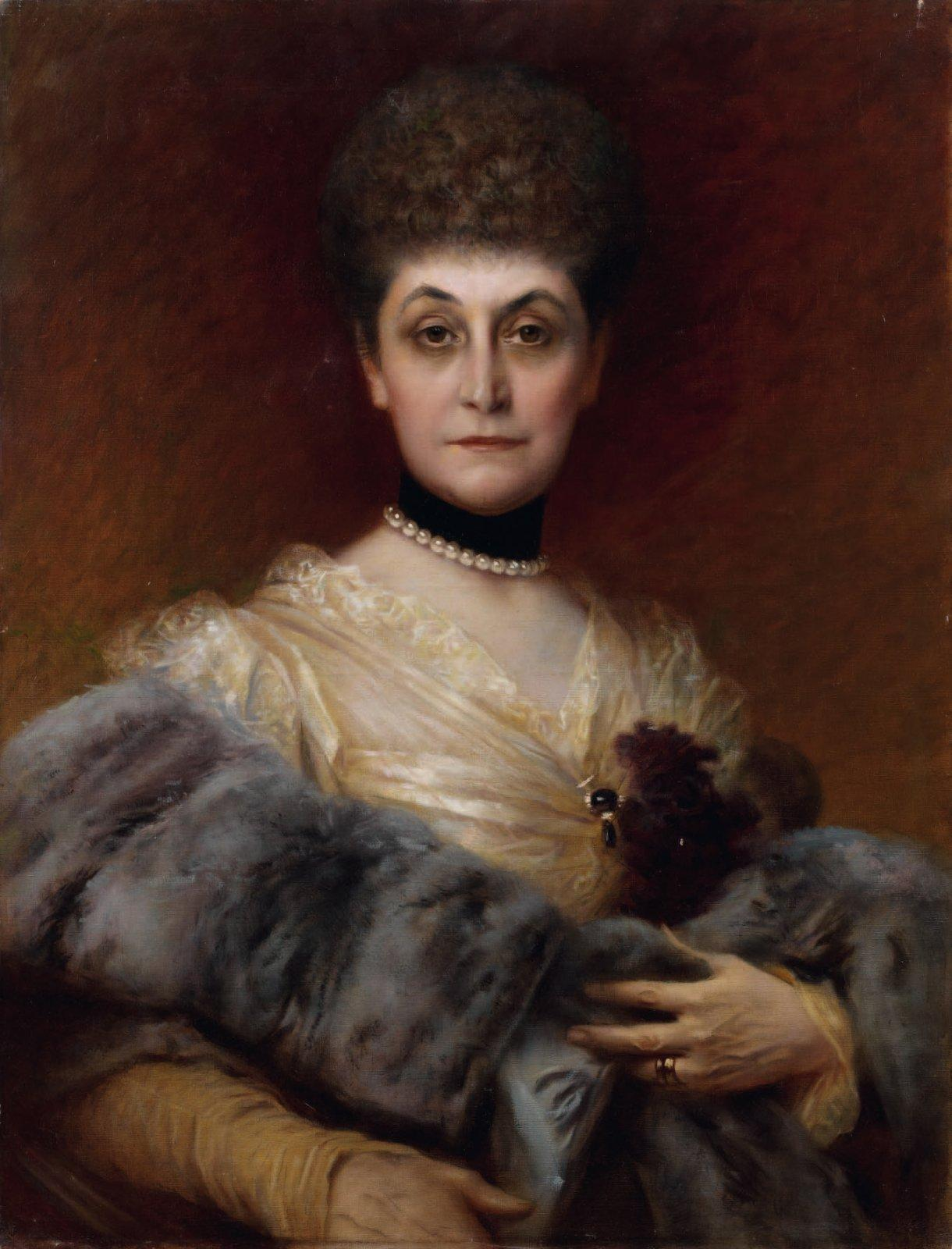
Portrait of his wife (after she remarried to Prince d'Essling), by Édouard Rosset-Granger, 1902

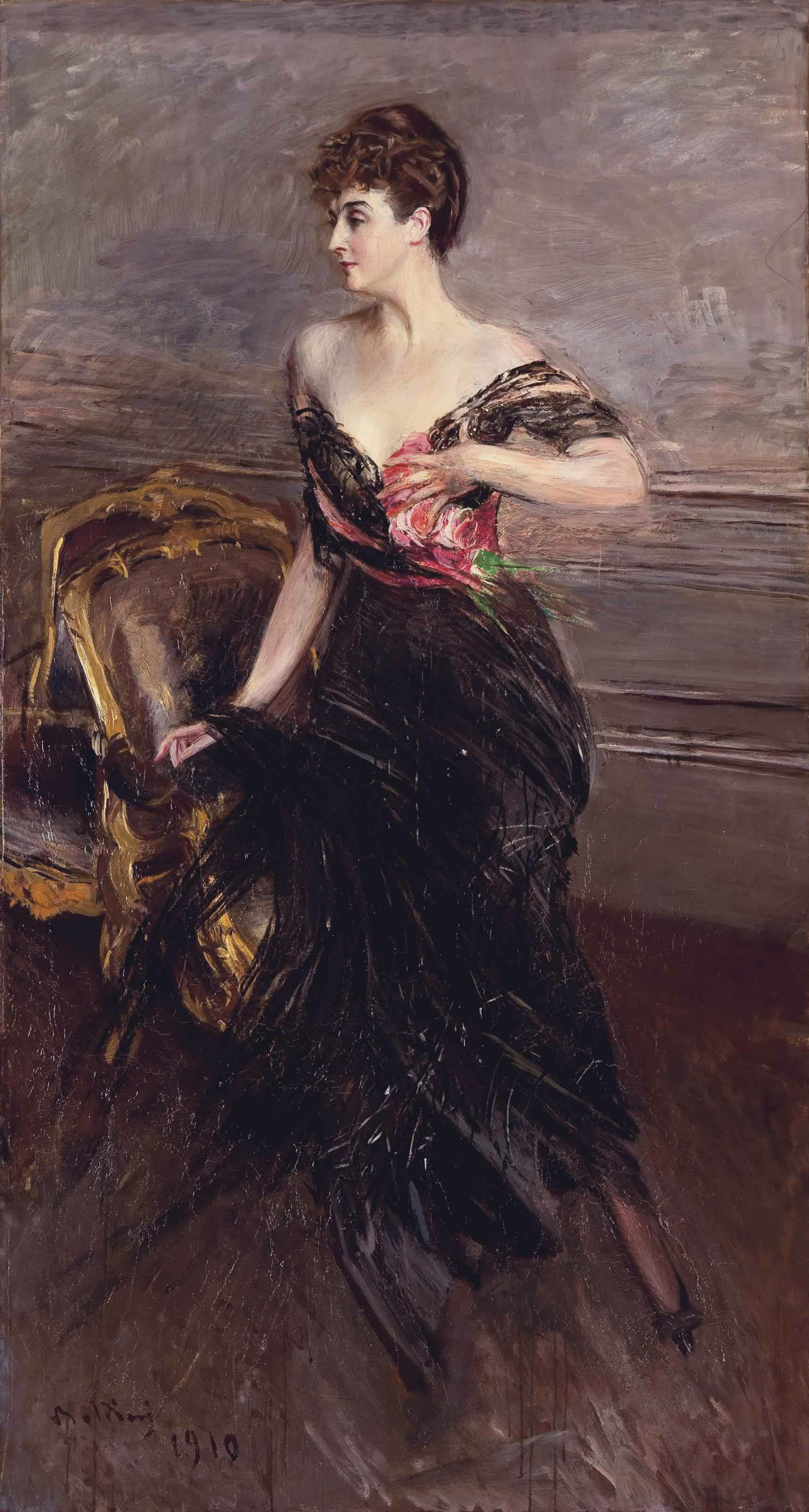
Portrait of his daughter, Cécile, by Giovanni Boldini, 1910

On 9 August 1866, he married Paule Marguerite Laure Juliette Furtado-Heine in Rocquencourt, Yvelines. She was the adopted daughter of wealthy Frankfurt banker Charles Heine and heiress Cécile Furtado-Heine who owned the Château de Rocquencourt. Together, they were the parents of seven children, two sons and five daughters, including:

- Marie Cécile Ney (1867–1960), who married Joachim Napoléon Murat, 5th Prince Murat, a son of Joachim, 4th Prince Murat and Malcy Louise Caroline Berthier de Wagram, in 1884.
- Marguerite Louise Ney (1868–1880), who died young.
- Léon Napoléon Louis Michel Ney, 4th Prince de la Moskowa (1870–1928), who married Princess Eugénie Laetitia Bonaparte, daughter of Napoléon Charles Bonaparte, 5th Prince of Canino in 1898. They divorced in 1903.
- Rose Blanche Mathilde Ney (1871–1939), who married Ottavio Lanza-Branciforte, 13th Prince of Trabia, in 1905.
- Charles Aloys Jean Gabriel Ney, 4th Duke of Elchingen, 5th Prince de la Moskowa (1873–1933), who married Germaine Roussel, sister of playwright Raymond Roussel, in 1902. After her death in May 1930, he married Denise Bienvenu in July 1930.
- Violette Jacqueline Charlotte Ney (1878–1936), who married Prince Eugène Murat, eldest son of Prince Louis Napoléon Murat, in 1899.
- Clotilde Ney (1880–1881), who died young.

The Duke was found dead at his rented house in Fontenay-aux-Roses on 23 February 1881. After his death, his widow married Victor Masséna, 5th Prince d'Essling, 5th Duc de Rivoli, son of François Victor Massena, 3rd Duke of Rivoli and Anne d'Essling, Grand-Maitresse (Senior Lady-in-Waiting) to Empress Eugénie. She died on 19 September 1903 in Bellagio, Italy.

=== Descendants ===
Through his eldest daughter, he was a grandfather of Joachim, 6th Prince Murat (1885–1938), who married Louise Amélie Plantié; Princess Marguerite Murat (1886–1956), who married Baron Edgar Lejeune; Prince Alexandre Murat (1889–1926) who married Yvonne Gillois; Prince Charles Michael Joachim Napoleon Murat (1892–1973), who married Margaret Stuyvesant Rutherfurd, step-daughter of William Kissam Vanderbilt; and the granddaughter of Lewis Morris Rutherfurd Prince Paul Murat (1893–1964), who married Solange de La Rochefoucald; Prince Louis Murat (1896–1916), who was killed in action during World War I; and Prince Jérôme Murat (1898–1992).

Through his youngest son Charles, he was a grandfather of Michel Georges Napoléon Ney, 6th Prince de la Moskowa, 5th Duc d'Elchingen (1905–1969), upon whose death both titles became extinct.

Through his daughter Violette, he was a grandfather of Pierre Murat (1900–1948), who married Princess Isabelle of Orléans, one of the four children of Prince Jean, Duke of Guise, who would become the Orleanist pretender to the French throne in 1926, and his wife Princess Isabelle of Orléans.

French nobility
Preceded by Michel Louis Ney	Duke of Elchingen; 1854–1881	Succeeded by Charles Aloys Ney
