= Maria Versfelt =

Dutch author and stage actress

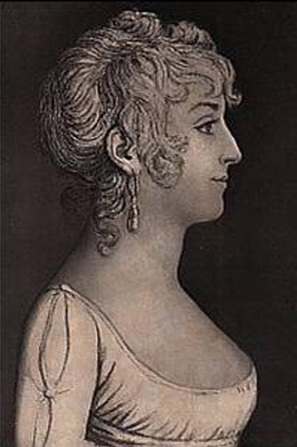
Maria Versfelt (Ida Saint-Elme)

Maria Johanna Elselina Versfelt (27 September 1776 – 19 May 1845), also known as Ida Saint-Elme, Elzelina van Aylde Jonghe, and by her pseudonym La Contemporaine, was a Dutch courtesan and author celebrated for her tumultuous life alongside French generals of the Grande Armée. Her travels through Italy, Egypt, and the Mediterranean are chronicled in her highly popular yet largely fictitious and unreliable memoirs. Additionally, she is credited with "possibly the earliest satirical magazine produced by a woman."

== Life ==
Versfelt was born in Lith to the portrayal in her fabricated memoirs, which erroneously claim a Tuscan origin. Her parents were Gerrit Versfelt (1735–1781), a vicar, and Alida de Jongh (1738–1828). and not Léopold-Ferdinand de Tolstoy and Van Aylde Jonghe, a corruption of her mother's name. After the death of her father, the family moved to Amsterdam and lived at Groenburgwal. In May 1792, at the age of 17, she married Jan Claasz Ringeling (1768–1801) the son of a helmsman from Buiksloot, with whom she resided at Nieuwendijk and not in Lille, that was Louise Fusil. They had two children; one of whom died in April 1796. In December 1795 they divorced on ground of adultery, as she became the mistress of French General Jean Victor Marie Moreau, with whom, she claims, she had an affair till 1799. He stopped seeing her when it became clear she was having an affair with Michel Ney as well. Although she claims to have married Alfred Saint Elme in Paris in 1802, no official record supports this claim.

In her Picaresque novels she maintains that General Ney was the love of her life, but he married Aglaé Auguié and left hastily to become ambassador in the Helvetic Republic in 1802. She alleges to have accompanied him on his military campaigns across Europe. In the battle of Eylau she claims to have fought as a soldier and sustained injuries. Then she claims to have been a reader for Elisa Bonaparte. According to her memoirs she joined the French invasion of Russia in 1812 and witnessed the French occupation of Moscow" but gives superficial details. It is questionable if she took part in the disastrous retreat of the French army from Russia in 1812 being accompanied Etienne-Maurice Gerard.

== Works ==
She published her memoirs with the help of Armand Malitourne, Amédée Pichot and Charles Nodier in eight volumes from 1827 to 1828, Mémoires d'une Contemporaine, which made her famous. Many prominent individuals (Julie Talma, Louise Fusil, and Theresa Cabarrus) and events appear in her memoirs. The front piece of the book showed a marble sculpture of Versfelt "representing her at the age of 19, lying naked on an ancient Greco-Roman bed." In the words of one outraged reviewer, she was the "indiscreet and immoral confidante of the men of the Directoire, the Empire and even the Restoration… and from each of these personalities, as a skillful courtesan, she had known how to extract things which should have died with the man and gone with him to his tomb." Jehan d'Ivray recounts that Versfelt told the story of how the French diplomat and Minister of finance Talleyrand used thousand franc bills to roll locks of her hair into curls one night, while she pointed out to him the ones he had missed. This was one of the classic 'kiss and tell' books of the 19th century and competed with other memories of women. It was an instant bestseller in France.

In 1831 Versfelt published her second book, La Contemporaine en Egypte, an account of her travels through France, Egypt, and the Mediterranean. "Give me the great highway, the pleasures and dangers of the road!" she says. Her trip is remarkable when we realize that she was more than 50 years old, and travel to Egypt in the 1820s was not easy. She is graciously thankful to the people who are nice to her and those she finds admirable, but she roasts with exquisite sarcasm those whom she finds ungracious, sanctimonious bigoted or unkind. She tempts her audience with veiled descriptions of the sexual attraction she feels for a traveling companion who is twenty years younger. Although Versfelt is clearly a French nationalist and a Bonapartist, this book often seems to go against the colonialist consensus: It presents very sympathetic portraits of Egyptians and Turks, appalling descriptions of the misery of the Egyptian people, and bitter criticism of the European community in Egypt and the flood of Europeans whom she sees arriving, "adventurers, swindlers and people with no talent whatsoever." After further travels around the Mediterranean, Versfelt managed to get onto an official French ship on which she returned in triumph to Marseille, where her editor was waiting.

Versfelt tried to repeat her success again in London with "possibly the earliest satirical magazine written, illustrated and published by a woman," according to an entry in the Princeton University graphic arts acquisitions catalogue it was called La Caricature francaise. Journal sans abonnees et sans collaborateurs (French caricature. A journal without subscribers and without collaborators). It was published in London to avoid censorship in France. However, when Versfelt published embarrassing letters supposedly written by King Louis Philippe I of France, she was prosecuted for libel. She was not convicted because "the court could not prove that the published letters were actually falsified." She died, aged 68, in Brussels, in the hospice of the Ursuline sisters.
