= Combat of the Alva River =

1811 battle during the Peninsular War

- Part of the Peninsular War
Date	17-19 March 1811
Location	near Arganil, Portugal
Result	Anglo-Portuguese victory

Belligerents
United Kingdom; Portugal	(France) French Empire

Commanders and leaders
(United Kingdom) Arthur Wellesley	(France) André Masséna

Casualties and losses
Light	600-800 captured

The Combat of the Alva River also known as the Passage of the Alva River was a minor engagement of the Peninsular War which took place between 17-19 March 1811. Following their defeat at Battle of Foz de Arouce two days earlier. The French attempted to cross the Alva River, and met up with elements of the pursuing Anglo-Portuguese army. Wellington however outmaneuvered the French who were forced into a hasty retreat. The engagement was the final part of the French retreat from Portugal in the spring of that year.

== Background ==
In 1810 the French under Marshall Andre Masséna had invaded Portugal but had been unable to break the Lines of Torres Vedras. During a severe winter the French suffered the loss of thousands of men to sickness & disease, and Masséna was forced to retreat. Marshall Michel Ney was given charge of the rear-guard while the main body of the French army retreated from Portugal. From the lines the Duke of Wellington pursued and forced the French rearguard to fight delaying actions.

Following their defeat Battle of Foz de Arouce on 16 March, the French abandoned their position on the Ceira River and retreated towards the River Alva. The French soon discovered that the bridge at Ponte de Murcella had been destroyed by the Loyal Lusitanian Legion led by Robert Wilson. Ney was forced to spend the rest of the day repairing it, which once completed began sending the army across. Ney half expected Wellington's advance guard to appear, but the latter had paused for the day due to critically low supplies. A convoy was on its way but had been slowed due to the mountainous area. The French too were also equally low on supplies and Masséna had risked sending out large parties of foragers and patrols to find food. The Portuguese however had conducted a well planned scorched earth policy. Wellington was aware that a lack of supplies would prevent Masséna from making a lengthy stop at any one place.

== Combat ==
On 17 March, the Anglo-Portuguese resumed their pursuit, by noon the advance guard had found the French in a strong position on the Alva River. The river was deep, wide and in some parts fast flowing. The following morning, Wellington ordered the Guard's Brigade of the 1st Division were sent towards Ponte de Murcella. The 3rd and 5th Divisions and the Portuguese brigades were to be sent along the mountain road from Furcado to Arganil. Ney was awaiting the British assault but could only see cavalry on the southern bank of the Alva.

The main British column reached Arganil late in the afternoon and drove out elements from Jean Reynier's 2nd Corps from the town. At the same time at Ponte de Murcella, Masséna was convinced that the British intended to either attack at Sarzedo, or to move even further east and cross the river beyond the French left, and attempt to block their line of retreat. Masséna ordered Jean-Andoche Junot's VIII Corps to break camp and move to Galiges, to the east of Sarzedo, to extend the French left.

The following morning, the Guards brigade crossed the road from Furcado to Arganil. They forced their way across the Alva at Pombeiro where a temporary bridge had been erected by the Royal Staff Corps. The bridge had been strategically placed between Ney's position at Ponte de Murcella and the rest of the French army. The British drove Ney's rearguard across it, and Reynier made no attempt to support the battalion defending it, instead drawing up a line of battle on the Serra de Moita. The British Light Division protected the bridgehead and then opened a cannonade against the troops of the French VI Corps. This was in fact a deception; there was no intention of the British crossing here as they made a farther attempt upstream.

The deception worked; Ney, believing he was in real danger of being trapped between the two wings of Wellington's army, quickly abandoned his position. Ney was forced destroy a large proportion of his baggage and ammunition. AS a result the foraging parties, patrols and other troops, were left behind. Some 600-800 French troops were captured as they were trapped between the river and approaching British troops. Cavalry of the King's German Legion alone took some 200 men prisoner, and as well several aides-de-camp.

== Aftermath ==
The British and Portuguese had forced the French out of a potentially very strong position with very little loss. The French then went into a lengthy night march and their morale plummeted.

On 20 March, Wellington's army was across the Alva, but only three divisions and the cavalry continued the chase as supplies were low. Wellington again had to halt, and wait for provisions coming in from the sea via Mondego River.

The following day Masséna had reached Celorico, and was within thirty miles of the Spanish border and the French held fortresses of Almeida and Ciudad Rodrigo. Ney bitterly complained about the whole operation into Portugal and refused to obey any more orders. Masséna immediately removed him his post and sent him back to Paris. Ney's replacement General Louis Henri Loison met up with Wellington's forces after the latter's capture of Guarda, but was forced to retreat without a fight. The French retreat was over and the third invasion of Portugal had been a complete disaster - Masséna had lost some 25,000 men to all causes as well as vast amounts of equipment.

Wellington defeated the French once more at the Battle of Sabugal on 3 April. The following day the British invested the fortress of Almeida.

== Bibliography ==
- Brown, Steve (2015). Wellington's Redjackets The 45h (Nottinghamshire) Regiment on Campaign in South America and the Peninsula, 1805–14. Pen & Sword Books. ISBN 9781473851764.
- Burnham, Robert; McGuigan, Ron (2024). Wellington's Light Division and the Defence of Portugal. The Battles of 1811. Frontline Books. ISBN 9781399060592.
- Buttery, David (2007). Wellington Against Massena The Third Invasion of Portugal, 1810-1811. Pen & Sword Military. ISBN 9781844155545.
- Glover, Michael (2001). The Peninsular War 1807–1814. London: Penguin. ISBN 978-0-141-39041-3.
- Grehan, John (2015). The lines of Torres Vedras : the cornerstone of Wellington's strategy in the Peninsular War, 1809-1812. Frontline Books. ISBN 9781473852747.
- Horward, Donald D, ed. (1973). The French Campaign in Portugal 1810-1811: An Account by Jean Jacques Pelet. Minneapolis, MN: University of Minnesota Press. ISBN 0-8166-0658-7.
- Oman, Sir Charles William Chadwick (1911). A history of the Peninsular War. Vol. IV. Oxford: Clarendon Press.
- Smith, Digby (1998). The Greenhill Napoleonic Wars Data Book: Actions and Losses in Personnel, Colours, Standards and Artillery, 1792-1815. Greenhill. ISBN 1-85367-276-9.
