= Prince de la Moskowa =

Noble title

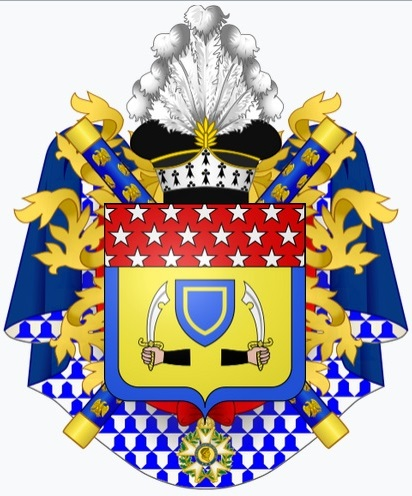
Heraldic achievement of Michel Ney as 1st Duke of Elchingen

The titles of Prince de la Moskowa (English: Prince of the Moskva) and Duc d'Elchingen (English: Duke of Elchingen) were created by Napoleon, Emperor of the French, for the Marshal of the Empire Michel Ney. Both were victory titles; Ney was created Duc d'Elchingen in 1808, after the Battle of Elchingen, and Prince de la Moskowa in 1813, after the Battle of Borodino (French: Bataille de la Moskowa, in reference to the Moskva River, 125 km outside Moscow).

In 1814, Ney became a peer of France. On his execution in 1815, the peerage was revoked, but it was restored in 1831. Clauses in the titles' patents of creation caused the title of Prince de la Moskowa to pass to Ney's eldest son, Joseph, and the title of Duc d'Elchingen to pass to his second son, Michel. This ensured that the two titles would never be held by the same person if there was another heir living, a similar situation to the British titles of Duke of Hamilton and Earl of Selkirk.

The two titles became united in one person in 1928 (Charles Aloys Ney, 4th Duc d'Elchingen from 1881 and 5th Prince de la Moskowa from 1928), and both became extinct with the death of the last heir in 1969.

== Ducs d'Elchingen (1808) ==
- Michel Ney (1769–1815), created 1st Duc d'Elchingen in 1808
- Michel Louis Félix Ney, 2nd Duc d'Elchingen (1804–1854), second son of the 1st duc, confirmed in his title in 1826
- Michel Aloys Ney, 3rd Duc d'Elchingen (1835–1881), only son of the 2nd duc
- Charles Aloys Jean Gabriel Ney, 4th Duc d'Elchingen (1873–1933), younger son of the 3rd duc, succeeded his father as 4th duc in 1881 and his elder brother as 5th Prince de la Moskowa in 1928
- Michel Georges Napoléon Ney, 6th Prince de la Moskowa, 5th Duc d'Elchingen (1905–1969)

== Princes de la Moskowa (1813) ==
- Michel Ney, 1st Duc d'Elchingen (1769–1815), created 1st Prince de la Moskowa in 1813
- Napoléon Joseph Ney, 2nd Prince de la Moskowa (1803–1857), eldest son of the 1st prince
- Edgar Napoléon Henry Ney, 3rd Prince de la Moskowa (1812–1882), fourth son of the 1st prince
- Léon Napoléon Louis Michel Ney, 4th Prince de la Moskowa (1870–1928), elder son of the 3rd Duc d'Elchingen
- Charles Aloys Jean Gabriel Ney, 5th Prince de la Moskowa, 4th Duc d'Elchingen (1873–1933), younger son of the 3rd Duc d'Elchingen, succeeded his father as 4th duc in 1881 and his elder brother as 5th Prince de la Moskowa in 1928
- Michel Georges Napoléon Ney, 6th Prince de la Moskowa, 5th Duc d'Elchingen (1905–1969)
