= Edgar Ney =

Prince of the Moskva (1812–1882)

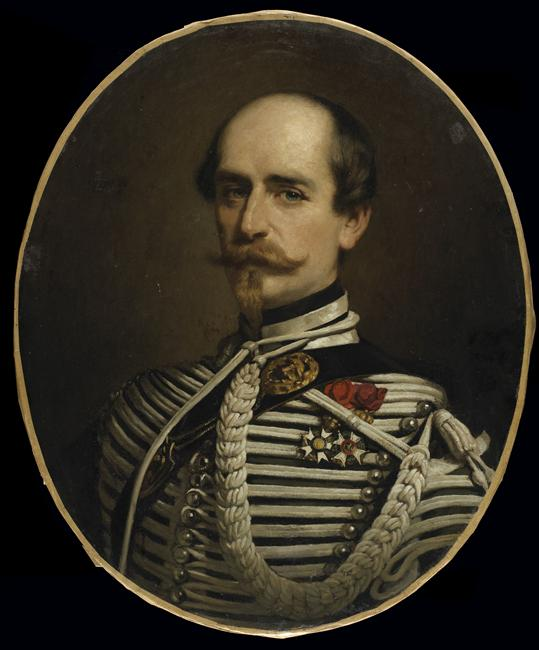
19th century portrait of the Prince de la Moskowa

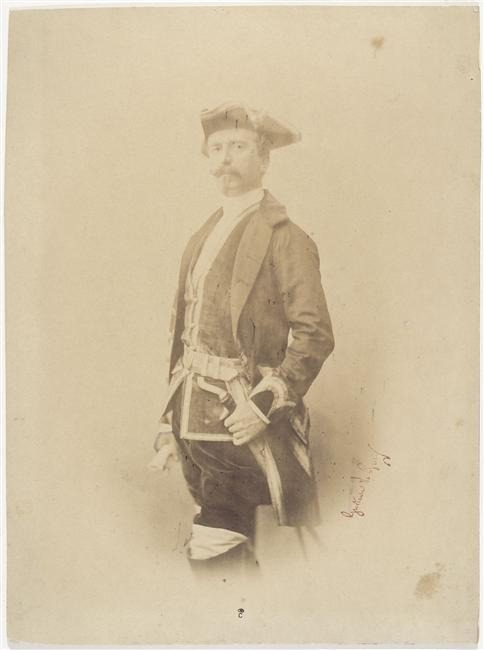
Photographic portrait of "Napoléon Edgar Ney, prince de la Moskowa, en tenue de vénerie" by Gustave Le Gray

Edgar Napoléon Henry Ney, 3rd Prince de la Moskowa (12 April 1812 – 4 October 1882) was a French general and politician.

== Early life ==
Edgar Napoléon Henry Ney was born in Paris on 12 April 1812. He was the fourth, and youngest, son of Michel Ney, 1st Prince de la Moskowa, and Aglaé Auguié (1782–1854). His elder brothers were Napoléon Joseph Ney, Michel Louis Félix, 2nd Duc d'Elchingen, (Note: His elder brother, Michel Louis Félix, 2nd Duc d'Elchingen (1804–1854), married Marie-Joséphine Souham, a daughter of Joseph Souham, before he died 14 July 1854 at Gallipoli during the Crimean War.) and Eugène Michel Ney (who died unmarried in 1845).

His maternal grandparents were Pierre César Auguié and Adélaïde Henriette Genet (sister of Henriette Campan and Citizen Genêt). His paternal grandparents were Pierre Ney, a master cooper and veteran of the Seven Years' War, and Marguerite Greiveldinger.

== Career ==
He was educated at the École spéciale militaire de Saint-Cyr. A soldier, he was made chief of squadron in December 1848,, General of Brigade in 1856 and General of Division in 1863.

Edgar was recognized as 3rd Prince de la Moskowa in 1857 after the death of his elder brother, Napoléon Joseph Ney. The title had been created in 1813 by Napoleon, Emperor of the French, for their father, Marshal of the Empire Michel Ney. As was his father's 1808 title, Duc d'Elchingen, it was a victory titles after the Battle of Borodino (French: Bataille de la Moskowa).

He was nominated as a Senator on 16 August 1859, serving as member of the Legislative Assembly of the French Second Republic.

== Personal life ==
On 16 January 1869, Prince de la Moskowa married Clotilde Joséphine Gabrielle de La Rochelambert (1829–1884) in Paris. The widow of Count Georges Huchet de La Bédoyère (with whom she had three children), she was a daughter of Senator Henri de La Rochelambert. Their marriage was childless. "Prince Edard de la Moskowa was a good-looking, unaffected man, on the most intimate terms with the Emperor, who invariably 'thee'd' and 'thou'd' him, and addressed him by his Christian name."

Prince de la Moskowa died in Paris on 4 October 1882. As he died without issue, the title of Prince de la Moskowa reverted to the descendants of his elder brother, Michel Louis Félix, who had inherited their father's earlier title, Duc d'Elchingen. His widow died in Paris in 1884.
