= Battle of Foz de Arouce =

1811 battle during the Peninsular War

- Part of the Peninsular War
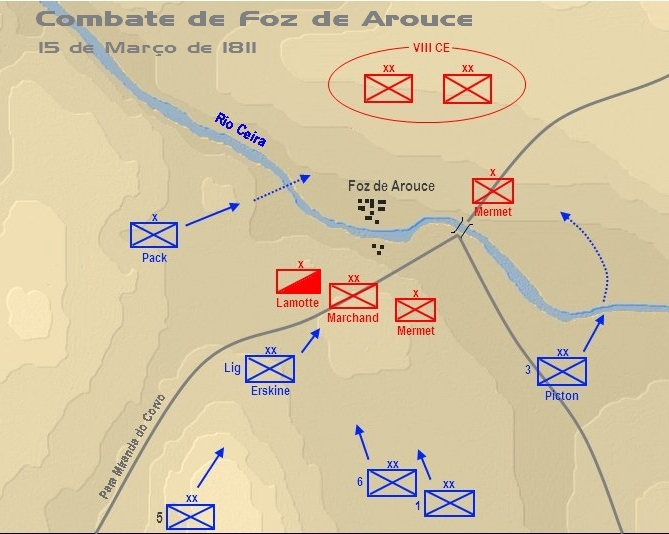
- The positions and movements during the Combat of Foz de Arouce
Date	15 March 1811
Location	Foz de Arouce, Lousã, Portugal 40°09′49″N 8°16′51″W
Result	Anglo-Portuguese victory

Belligerents
United Kingdom; Portugal	(France) French Empire

Commanders and leaders
(United Kingdom) Arthur Wellesley	(France) Michel Ney

Strength
8,000; 12 cannons	7,000

Casualties and losses
71 killed and wounded	250 killed, wounded and captured

Peninsular War
Third French invasion:
1 Siege of Astorga March April 1810
2 Siege of Ciudad Rodrigo April 1810
3 Siege of Almeida July 1810
3.1 Blockade of Almeida April 1811
4 Battle of Bussaco September 1810
5 Torres Vedras protects Lisbon
6 Battle of Foz de Arouce March 1811
7 Battle of Sabugal April 1811
8 Battle of Fuentes de Oñoro May 1811

The Battle of Foz de Arouce was an engagement of the Peninsular War which took place on 15 March 1811 between Anglo-Portuguese forces under Arthur Wellesley (later the Duke of Wellington) and French troops under the command of Marshal Michel Ney.

== Background ==
The battle was part of Andre Masséna’s retreat from Portugal in the spring of 1811.

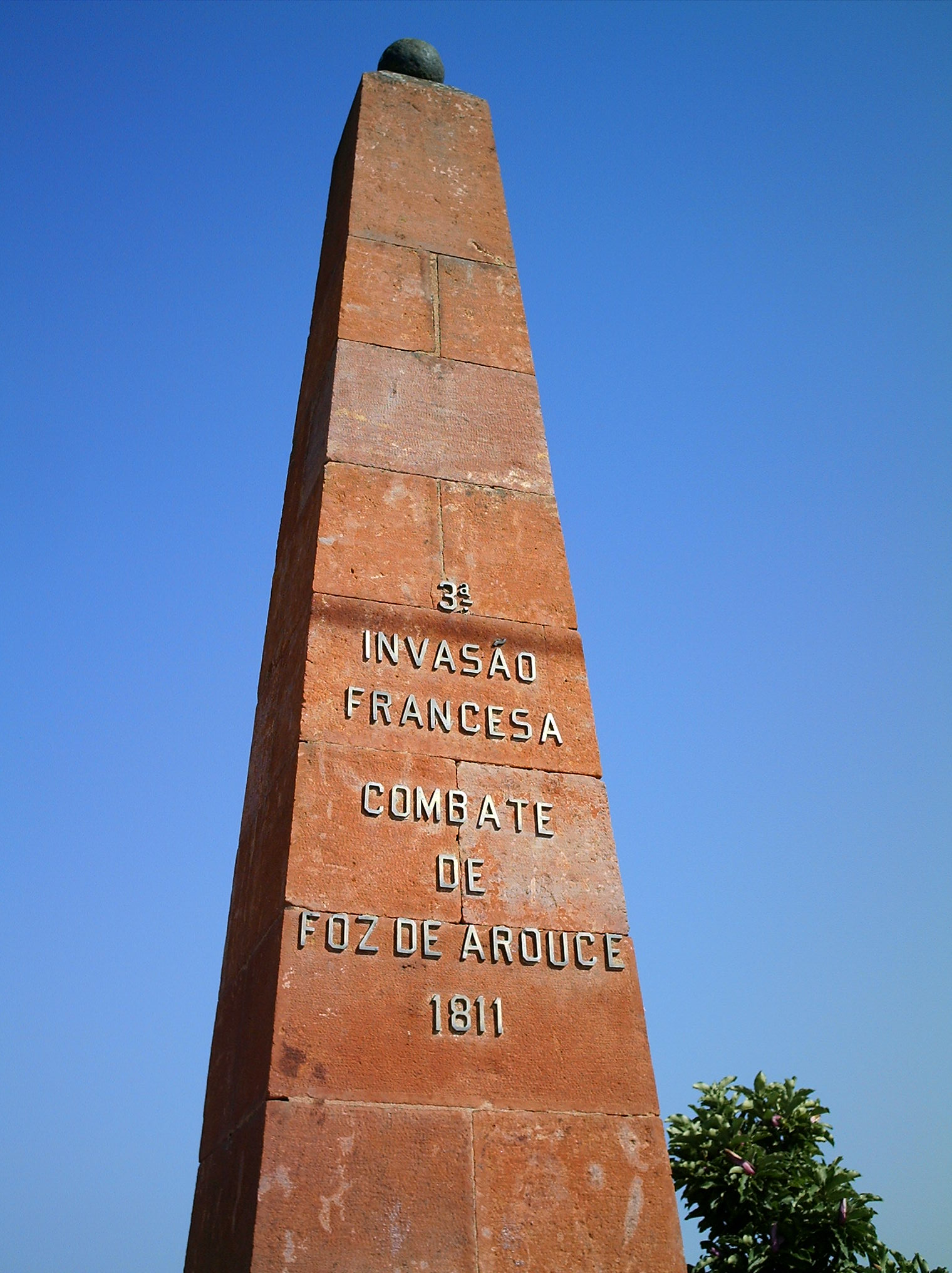
A monument of the 3rd French Invasion in Foz de Arouce

== Battle ==
The French troops had not occupied adequate defensive positions. Wellington decided to attack immediately. It was the surprise that allowed him to immediately succeed in the first attack. Some companies of the 95th Rifles (of the Light Division) followed a narrow road and reached the center of Foz de Arouce, very close to the bridge, meeting almost without opposition. The other units of the Light Division were involved in frontal combat with Marchand's Division and the 3rd Division headed for Mermet's Brigade which constituted the French left flank. Despite weak opposition the 95th Rifles companies eventually came into contact with some French forces. The confusion of combat with these companies, on the side of the bridge, alerted the French troops to the danger of being cut off from the rear and several units left the battle line and hurriedly headed towards the river. Attempting to cross the bridge, they ended up being confronted by Lamotte's cavalry, who had crossed the river about an hour before, passing to the left bank, where the Marchand Division was located. Prevented from passing, the fugitives attempted the crossing at a ford near the confluence of the rivers. The river flow was high and many drowned and the regimental eagle (from the 39th Regiment) was lost and its commander captured.

Ney saved the situation by launching the 3rd Battalion of the 69th Regiment (3/69me) in a counterattack against the companies of the 95th Rifles that had entered Foz de Arouce and were threatening the bridge. They were forced to withdraw to where the other battalions of the Light Division were. The passage over the bridge was thus free and the French troops crossed it in some disorder. While they were doing so, they were victims of allied artillery fire and also of the VIII CE, which in the midst of the confusion could not distinguish between friendly and enemy forces. However, night fell and the French, after completing the crossing, blew up the bridge.

French sources document casualties varying between 200 and 400. Charles Oman offers an estimate of about 250 casualties. On the Allied side, 71 casualties were recorded (9 dead and 62 wounded), two being Portuguese.

The French then tried to make a stand on the Alva River but Wellington however outmaneuvered the French who were forced into a hasty retreat.
