= Napoléon Joseph Ney =

French politician

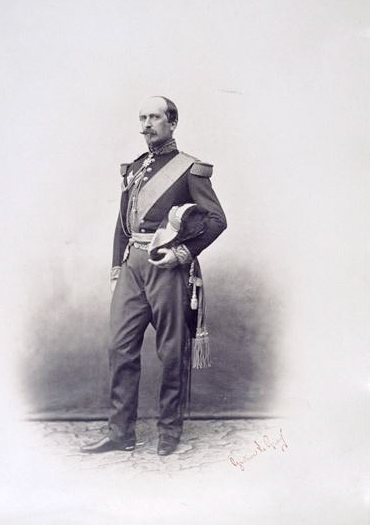
Portrait of général prince de La Moskowa (1857) by Gustave Le Gray

Napoléon Joseph Ney (8 May 1803 – 25 July 1857) was a French politician, 2nd Prince de la Moskowa.

== Early life ==
Ney was born in Paris on 8 May 1803. Named for his godfather, Emperor Napoléon I, he was the elder son of Michel Ney, Marshal of the Empire, and his wife, Aglaé Auguié (1782–1854). His younger brothers were Michel Louis Félix, 2nd Duc d'Elchingen, (Note: His elder brother, Michel Louis Félix, 2nd Duc d'Elchingen (1804–1854), married Marie-Joséphine Souham, a daughter of Joseph Souham, before he died 14 July 1854 at Gallipoli during the Crimean War.) and Eugène Michel Ney (who died unmarried in 1845).

His maternal grandparents were Pierre César Auguié and Adélaïde Henriette Genet (sister of Henriette Campan and Citizen Genêt). His paternal grandparents were Pierre Ney, a master cooper and veteran of the Seven Years' War, and Marguerite Greiveldinger.

== Career ==
In November 1831 he was created a peer of France in a batch of thirty-six lifetime peers.

== Personal life ==
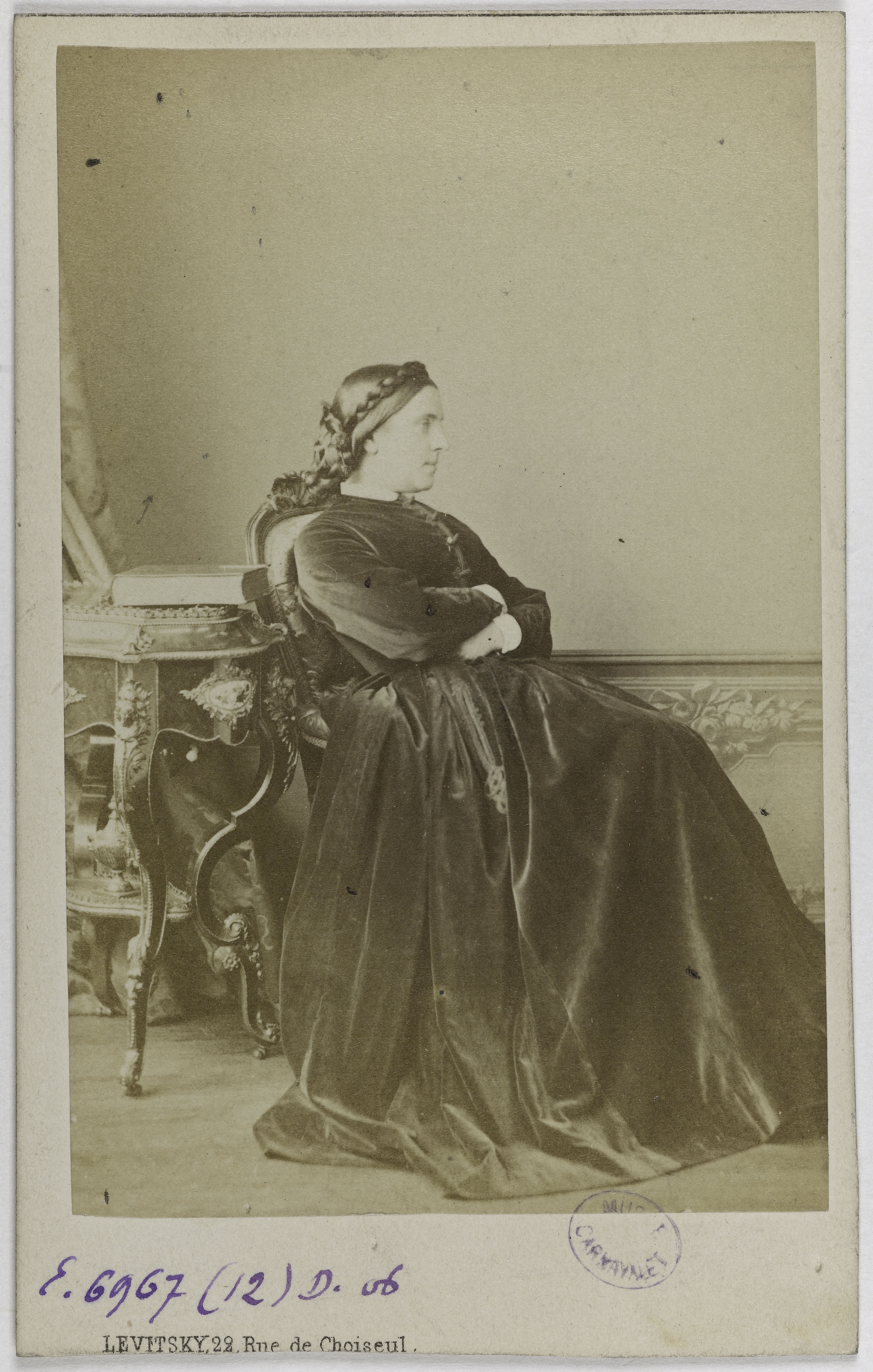
Photograph of his daughter, between 1860 and 1890

In 1828, he married Albine Étiennette Marguerite Laffitte (1805–1881), the daughter of the banker and politician Jacques Laffitte. Together, they were the parents of:

- Albine Marie Napoléone Aglaé Ney (1832-1890), who married Jean Gilbert Victor Fialin, Duke of Persigny in 1852. After his death in 1872, she married Hyacinthe Hilaire Adrien Le Moyne in 1873. After his death in 1879, she married Charles de Villelume-Sombreuil in 1889.
- Michel Napoléon Ney de la Moskowa (1837–1852), who died young.

Ney also had an illegitimate child, Jules Napoléon Ney (1849–1900) with Julie de Mesvres. His son Jules, married Theresa-Olympe Pinto de Araujo, a daughter of the Brazilian expatriate Marcos Pinto de Araujo.

He died in Saint-Germain-en-Laye on 25 July 1857. As his only legitimate son predeceased him, the title of Prince de la Moskowa passed to his youngest brother, Edgar.

French nobility
Preceded by Michel Ney	Prince de la Moskowa; 1815–1857	Succeeded by Edgar Ney
