= Celorico =

Celorico may refer to the following places in Portugal:

- Celorico de Basto, a municipality in the district of Braga
- Celorico da Beira, a municipality in the district of Guarda
