= Michel Ney =

French military commander (1769–1815)

Marshal of the Empire Michel Ney Prince de la Moskowa
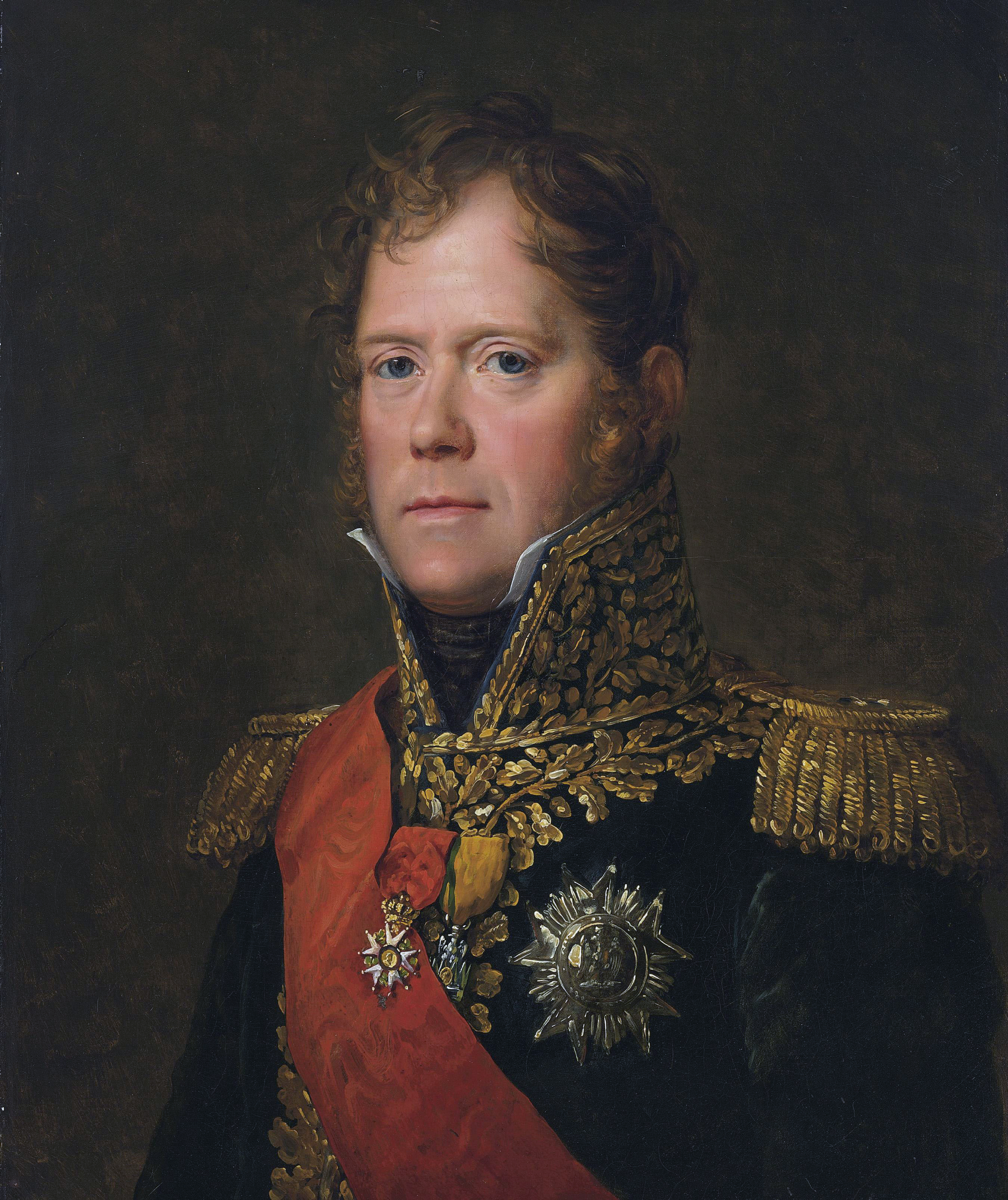
- Portrait by François Gérard, 1805
- Born: 10 January 1769; Saarlouis, Kingdom of France (today Germany)
- Died: 7 December 1815 (aged 46); Paris, Kingdom of France
- Cause of death: Execution by firing squad
- Burial place: Père Lachaise Cemetery
- Military career
- Allegiance: France
- Branch: French Army
- Service years: 1787–1815
- Rank: Marshal of the Empire
- Nicknames: Le Brave des braves, 'The Bravest of the Brave'; Le Rougeaud, 'The Ruddy-Faced'
- Commands: Army of the Rhine; VI Corps; III Corps
- Wars: See battles: French Revolutionary Wars; War of the First Coalition; Battle of Valmy; Battle of Neerwinden (1793); Siege of Mainz (1793) (WIA); War of the Second Coalition; Battle of Neuwied (1797); Battle of Winterthur (WIA); Battle of Hohenlinden; Napoleonic Wars; War of the Third Coalition; Battle of Günzburg; Battle of Elchingen; Battle of Ulm; War of the Fourth Coalition; Battle of Jena; Siege of Magdeburg (1806); Battle of Eylau; Battle of Guttstadt-Deppen; Battle of Friedland; Peninsular War; Battle of Puente Sanpayo; Battle of Puerto de Baños; Siege of Ciudad Rodrigo (1810); Combat of the Côa; Siege of Almeida (1810); Battle of Bussaco; Battle of Pombal; Battle of Redinha; Battle of Casal Novo; Battle of Foz de Arouce; French invasion of Russia; First Battle of Krasnoi; Battle of Valutino; Battle of Smolensk (1812) (WIA); Battle of Borodino; Battle of Vyazma; Battle of Krasnoi; Battle of Berezina; War of the Sixth Coalition; Battle of Lützen (1813) (WIA); Battle of Bautzen (1813); Battle of Dennewitz; Combat of Rosslau; Battle of Leipzig (WIA); Campaign in north-east France (1814); Battle of Laon; Hundred Days; Battle of Quatre Bras; Battle of Waterloo
- Awards: Legion of Honour; Order of the Iron Crown

Signature
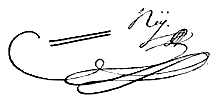

Michel Ney, 1st Prince de la Moskowa, 1st Duke of Elchingen (English: /ˈneɪ/ NAY, French: [miʃɛl nɛ]; 10 January 1769 – 7 December 1815), was a French military commander and Marshal of the Empire who fought in the French Revolutionary Wars and the Napoleonic Wars.

The son of a cooper from Saarlouis, Ney worked as a civil servant until 1787 when he enlisted in a cavalry regiment, right before the outbreak of the French Revolution. Distinguishing himself as a cavalry officer in the War of the First Coalition, he quickly rose through the ranks and, by the Battle of Hohenlinden (1800), he had been promoted to divisional general. On Napoleon's proclamation of the French Empire, Ney was named one of the original 18 Marshals of the Empire. He played an instrumental role during Napoleon's subsequent campaigns, seeing action at Elchingen (1805), Jena (1806) and Eylau (1807). Ney commanded the French rearguard during the disastrous invasion of Russia, for which he was lauded as "the bravest of the brave" by the emperor.

After Napoleon's defeat by the Sixth Coalition in 1814, Ney pressured the emperor to abdicate and pledged his allegiance to the restored Bourbon monarchy. He rejoined Napoleon during the Hundred Days but met defeat at the Battle of Waterloo (1815), after which he was charged with treason by the restored monarchy and executed by firing squad.

== Early life ==
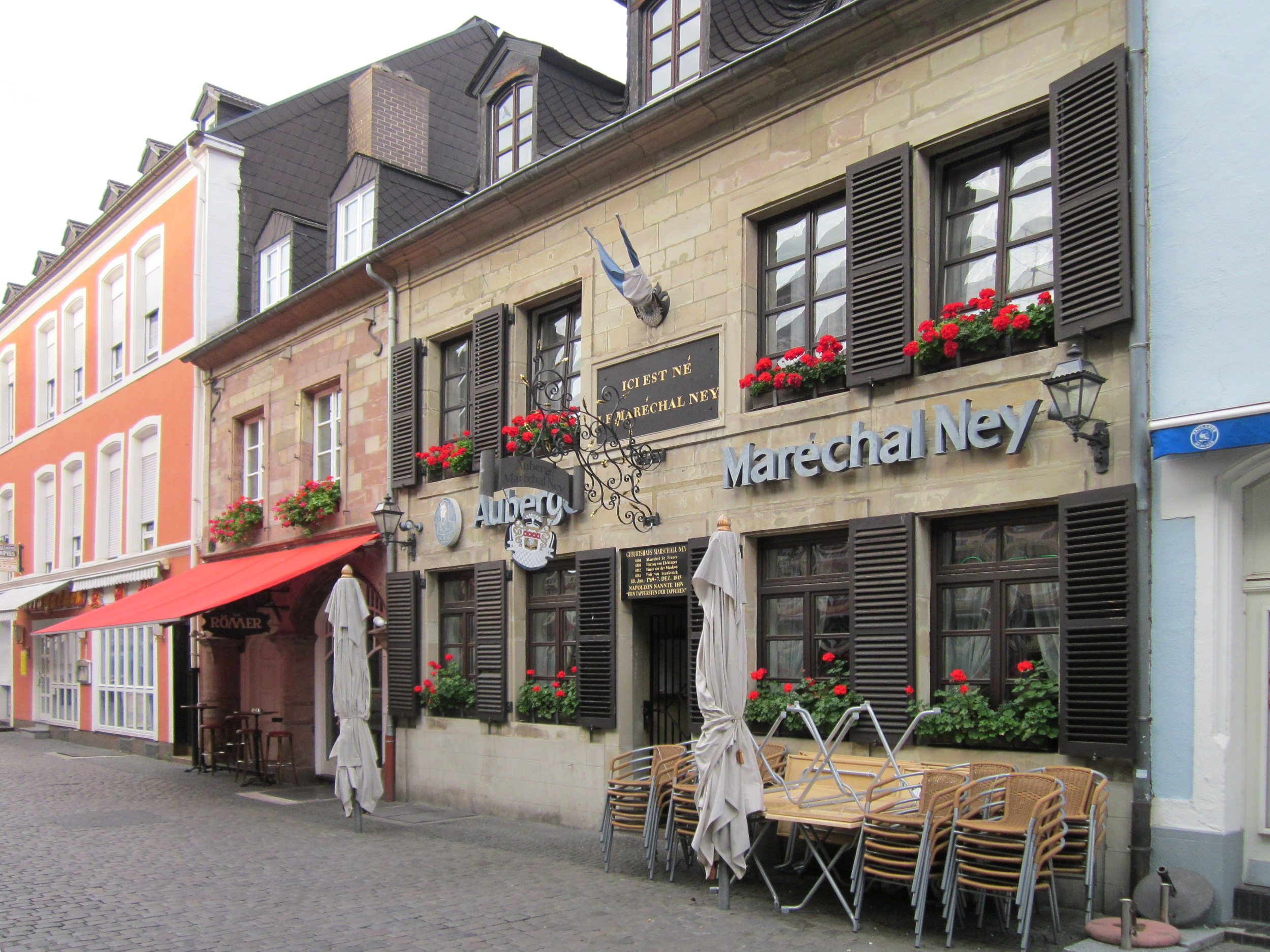
Ney's birthplace in Saarlouis

Ney was born in the town of Sarrelouis, in the French province of Lorraine, along the French–German border. He was the second son of Pierre Ney (1738–1826), a master cooper and veteran of the Seven Years' War, and his wife Marguerite Greiveldinger.

His hometown at the time of his birth was a French enclave in the predominantly German region of Saarland, and Ney grew up bilingual, due to his German roots. He was educated at the Collège des Augustins in Sarrelouis until 1782, when he began working as a clerk in a local notary's office, and in 1784 was employed in mines and forges.

== Military career ==
=== French Revolutionary Wars ===
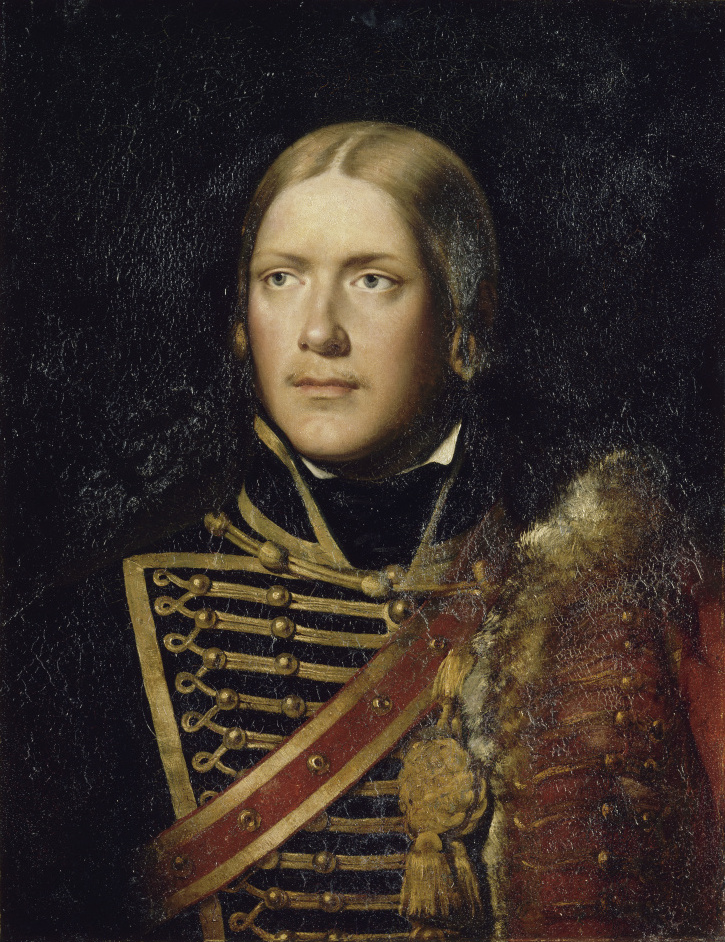
Michel Ney as a sous-lieutenant in the 4th Hussars in 1792 by Adolphe Brune, 1834

Life as a civil servant did not suit Ney, and he enlisted in the Colonel-General Hussar Regiment in 1787. Under the Bourbon monarchy, entry to the officer corps of the French Army was restricted to those with four quarterings of nobility (i.e., two generations of aristocratic birth). However, Ney rapidly rose through the non-commissioned officer ranks.

Following the French Revolution, Ney continued to serve in what was now the French Revolutionary Army, in the Army of the North. In September 1792 he saw action at the Battle of Valmy and in October was commissioned as an officer under the Republic. As an officer he participated in the Battle of Neerwinden in 1793 and was wounded at the Siege of Mainz, also in 1793. In June 1794, he was transferred to Army of Sambre-et-Meuse.

Ney was promoted to brigadier general in August 1796, and commanded cavalry on the German fronts. On 17 April 1797, during the Battle of Neuwied, Ney led a cavalry charge against Austrian lancers trying to seize French cannons. The lancers were beaten back, but Ney's cavalry were counter-attacked by heavy cavalry. During the mêlée, Ney was thrown from his horse and captured in the vicinity of the municipality of Dierdorf; on 8 May he was exchanged for an Austrian general. Following the capture of Mannheim, Ney was promoted to général de division on 28 March 1799 and was given brief command over the Army of the Rhine from 25 September to 23 October. Later in 1799, Ney commanded cavalry in the armies of Switzerland and the Danube. At Winterthur, Ney received wounds in the thigh and wrist. After recovering he fought at Hohenlinden under General Jean Victor Marie Moreau in December 1800. From September 1802, Ney commanded French troops in Switzerland and performed diplomatic duties.

=== Napoleonic Wars ===
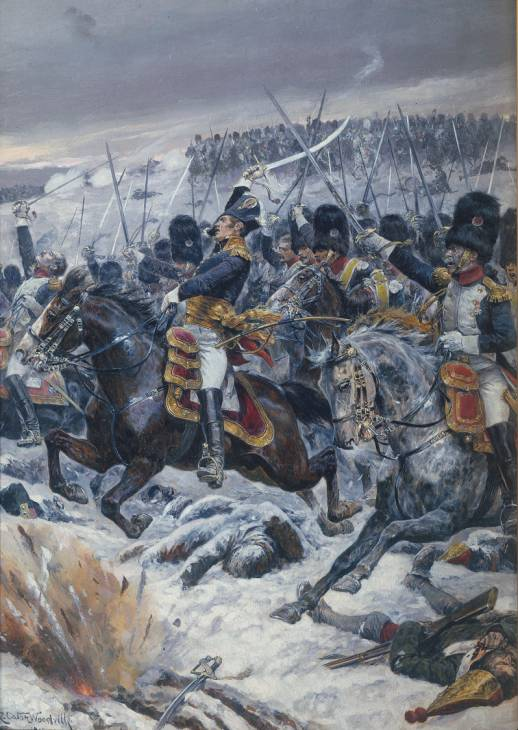
Ney at the Battle of Eylau

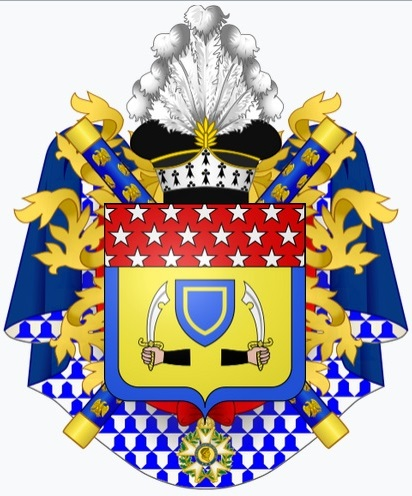
Heraldic achievement of Michel Ney as Duke of Elchingen

On 19 May 1804, Ney received his marshal's baton, emblematic of his status as a Marshal of the Empire, the Napoleonic era's equivalent of Marshal of France. In the 1805 campaign, Ney took command of the VI Corps of the Grande Armée and was praised for his conduct at Elchingen. In November 1805, Ney invaded Tyrol, capturing Innsbruck from Archduke John. In the 1806 campaign, Ney fought at Jena and then occupied Erfurt. Later in the campaign, Ney successfully besieged Magdeburg. In the 1807 campaign, Ney arrived with reinforcements in time to save Napoleon from defeat at Eylau. Later in the campaign, Ney fought at Güttstadt and commanded the right wing at Friedland. On 6 June 1808, Ney was made Duke of Elchingen.

In August 1808, he was sent to Spain in command of the VI Corps and saw action in a number of minor engagements. In 1809, he skirmished with a Luso-Spanish force under Sir Robert Wilson at Puerto de Baños. In 1810, Ney joined Marshal André Masséna in the invasion of Portugal, where he captured Ciudad Rodrigo and Almeida, and saw further action on the River Côa, and a defeat at the Bussaco. The French army followed the retreating allies to the Lines of Torres Vedras, a scorched earth trap prepared by Wellington in absolute secrecy. After losing 21,000 men of 61,000 in several months of hunger, Masséna and Ney were forced to retreat due to lack of food and supplies, see also attrition warfare against Napoleon. Ney engaged Wellington's forces in a series of rearguard actions (Pombal, Redinha, Casal Novo, and Foz de Arouce) through which he managed to delay the pursuing Coalition forces long enough to allow the main French force to retreat in 1811. Following the crossing of the Alva River Ney bitterly complained about the whole Portugal operation and refused to obey any more orders. Masséna thus removed Ney for insubordination and sent him to Paris.

=== Russia to Fontainebleau ===
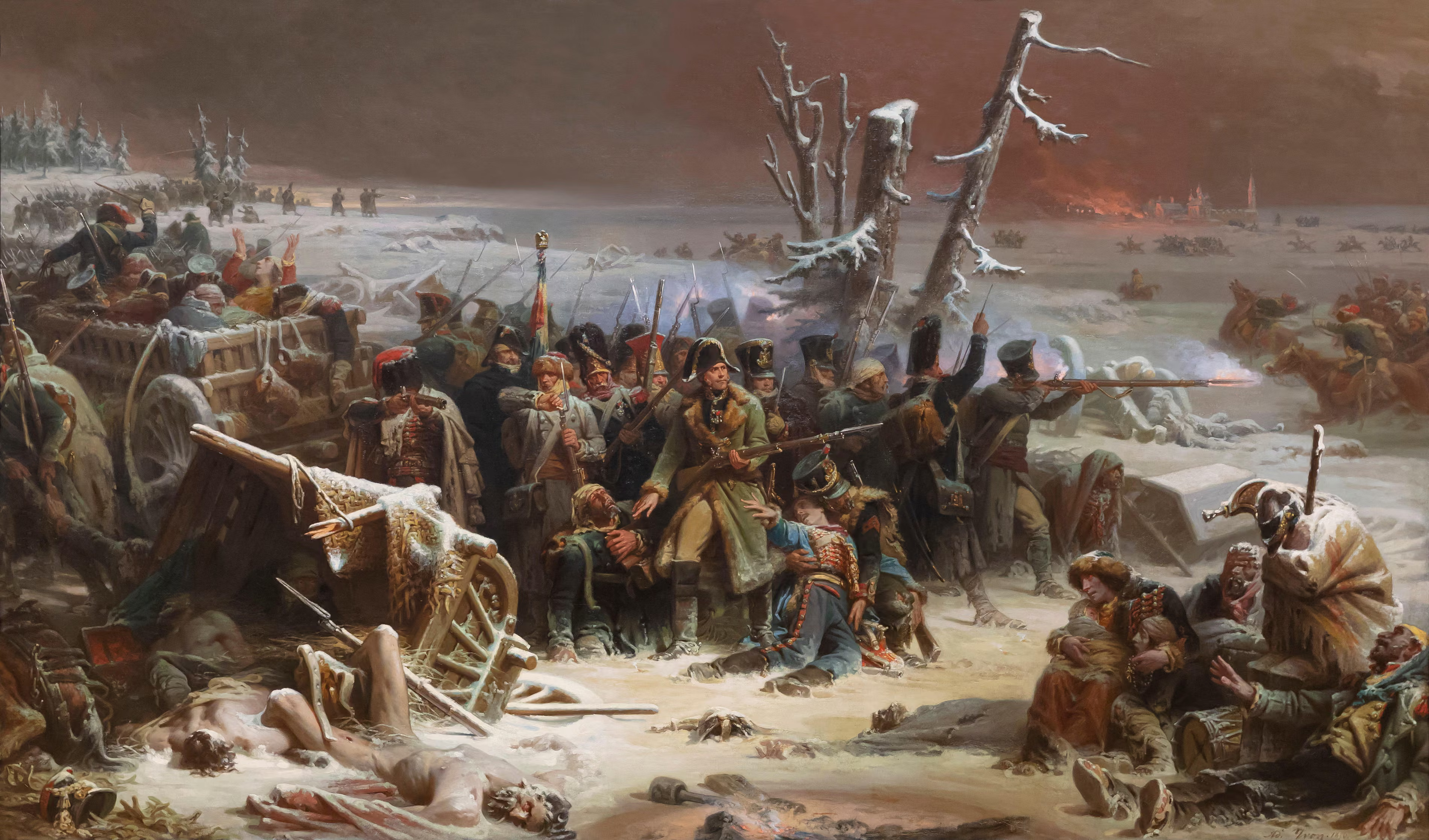
Marshal Ney Supporting the Rear Guard During the Retreat from Moscow by Adolphe Yvon.

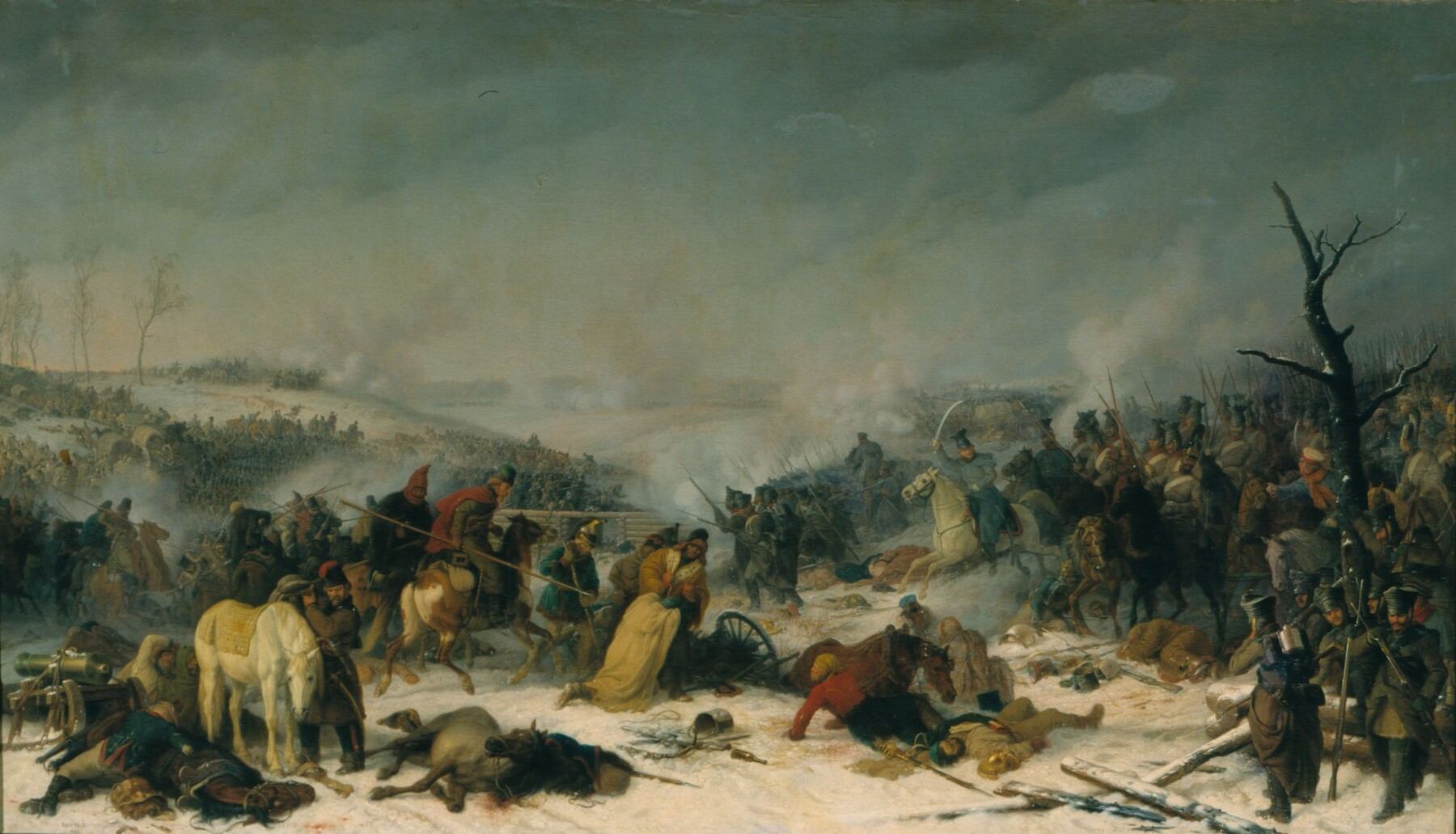
The battle at Losvinka brook by Peter von Hess

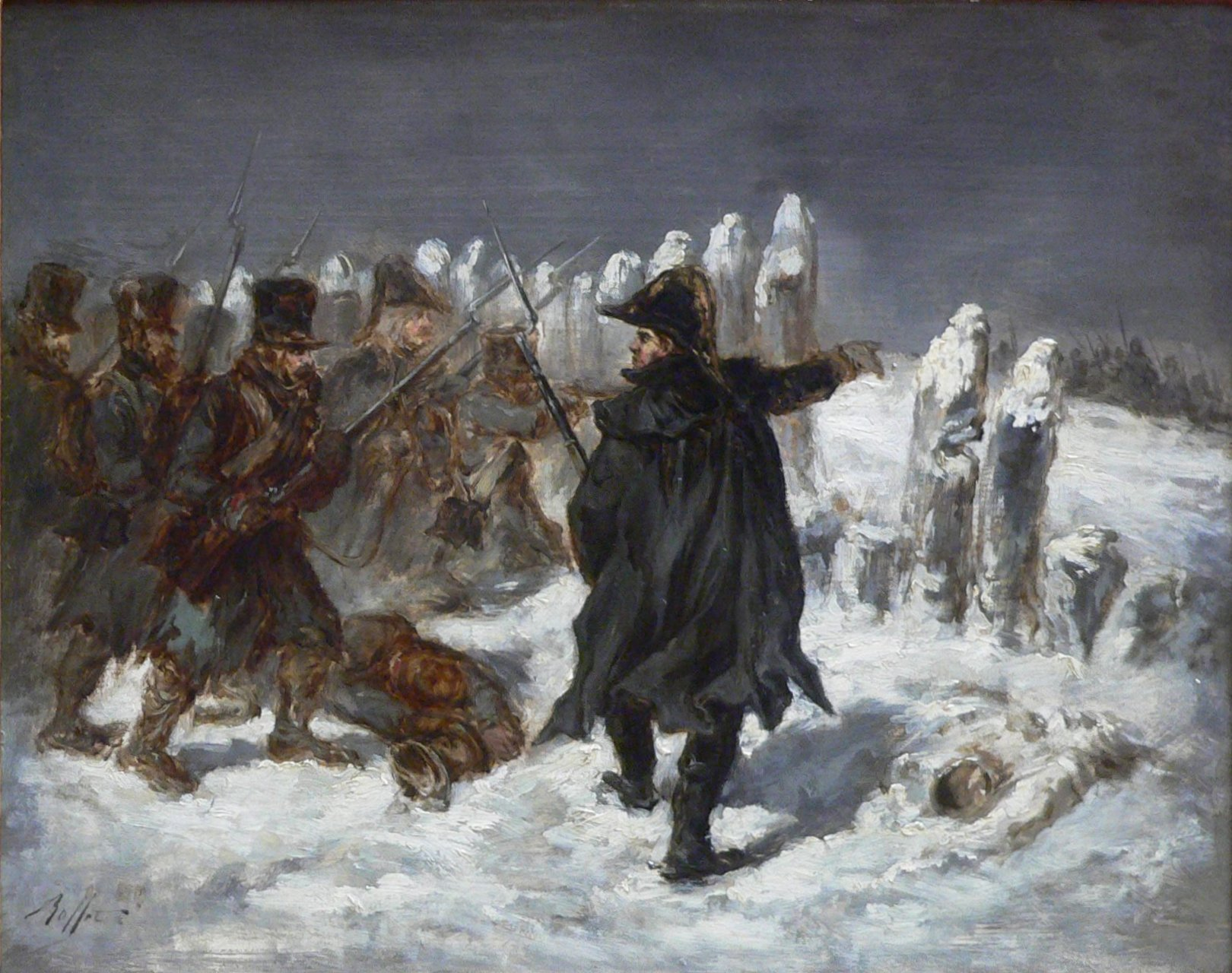
Ney at the Battle of Kovno in 1812, by Denis-August-Marie Raffet

Ney was given command of the III Corps of the Grande Armée during the invasion of Russia in 1812. At Smolensk, Ney was wounded in the neck but recovered enough to later fight in the central sector at Borodino. During the retreat from Moscow, Ney commanded the rearguard (and was known as "the last Frenchman on Russian soil" when he passed the Niemen on 14 December). After being cut off from the main army during the Battle of Krasnoi, Ney managed to escape in a heavy fog over the Dnieper River, but not without heavy losses, and to rejoin it in Orsha, which delighted Napoleon. For this action Ney was given the nickname "the bravest of the brave" by the emperor.

=== Ney crossing the Dniepr ===
Ney lost more than half his strength; almost all the cavalry and all the artillery, with the exception of two guns, had disappeared. The terrible defeat of the III Corps was thorough enough to induce the chivalrous Miloradovich to extend another honorable surrender to Ney. In the early evening during a heavy fog Ney decided to draw back with 3,000 men. Ney escaped passing around the Russians at Mankovo, following the brook Losvinka for two hours, about 13 km north. At midnight he was informed that the enemy was approaching. In the middle of the night Ney decided to cross the Dnieper, supposedly near the remote hamlet Alekseyevka at a spot which could be used in summer to cross the river but with an almost vertical slope. Ney literally got down on all fours. One by one, but not without heavy losses, leaving guns, horses, part of the detachment and wounded who could not go on. The river, 110 m wide and of a depth that could reach up to 2 m, was only frozen for a couple of days, leaving it fragile, and the ice broke in several places. When Ney and his men reached the other bank, they had to climb a twelve-foot (3.7 m), very steep slope. The elements and the Cossacks reduced Ney's contingent to only 800 (900, 2,000?) diehards. In the previous 24 hours, 3,000 armed men and 4,000 stragglers had either died or strayed from its ranks. Armand de Briqueville increased the number of abandoned cannons to 6 and increases the number of people who cross to 5–6000.

Ney ordered everyone to move to the Dnieper in the hope of crossing to the opposite bank on the ice. Everyone, from soldiers to officers, was amazed by this decision. To surprised and incredulous stares, Ney declared that if no one supported him, he would go alone. And the soldiers knew very well that this was not posturing. When, finally, the lucky ones reached the opposite shore and already considered themselves saved. To get to the shore, they had to climb another steep icy slope. Many fell back on the ice. Of the three thousand soldiers who accompanied Ney, 2,200 drowned during the crossing.

Ney fought at Berezina and helped hold the vital bridge at Kovno (modern-day Kaunas), where legend portrays Ney as the last of the invaders to cross the bridge and exit Russia. On 25 March 1813, Ney was given the title of Prince de la Moskowa. During the 1813 campaign, Ney fought at Weissenfels, was wounded at Lützen, and commanded the left wing at Bautzen. Ney later fought at Dennewitz and Leipzig, where he was again wounded. In the 1814 campaign in France, Ney fought various battles and commanded various units. At Fontainebleau, Ney became the spokesperson for the marshals' revolt on 4 April 1814, demanding Napoleon's abdication. Ney informed Napoleon that the army would not march on Paris; Napoleon responded, "the army will obey me!" to which Ney answered, "the army will obey its chiefs".

When Paris fell and the Bourbons reclaimed the throne, Ney, who had pressured Napoleon to accept his first abdication and exile, was promoted, lauded, and made a Peer of France by the newly enthroned King Louis XVIII. Although Ney had pledged his allegiance to the restored monarchy, the Bourbon court looked down on him because he was a commoner by birth.

=== Hundred Days ===
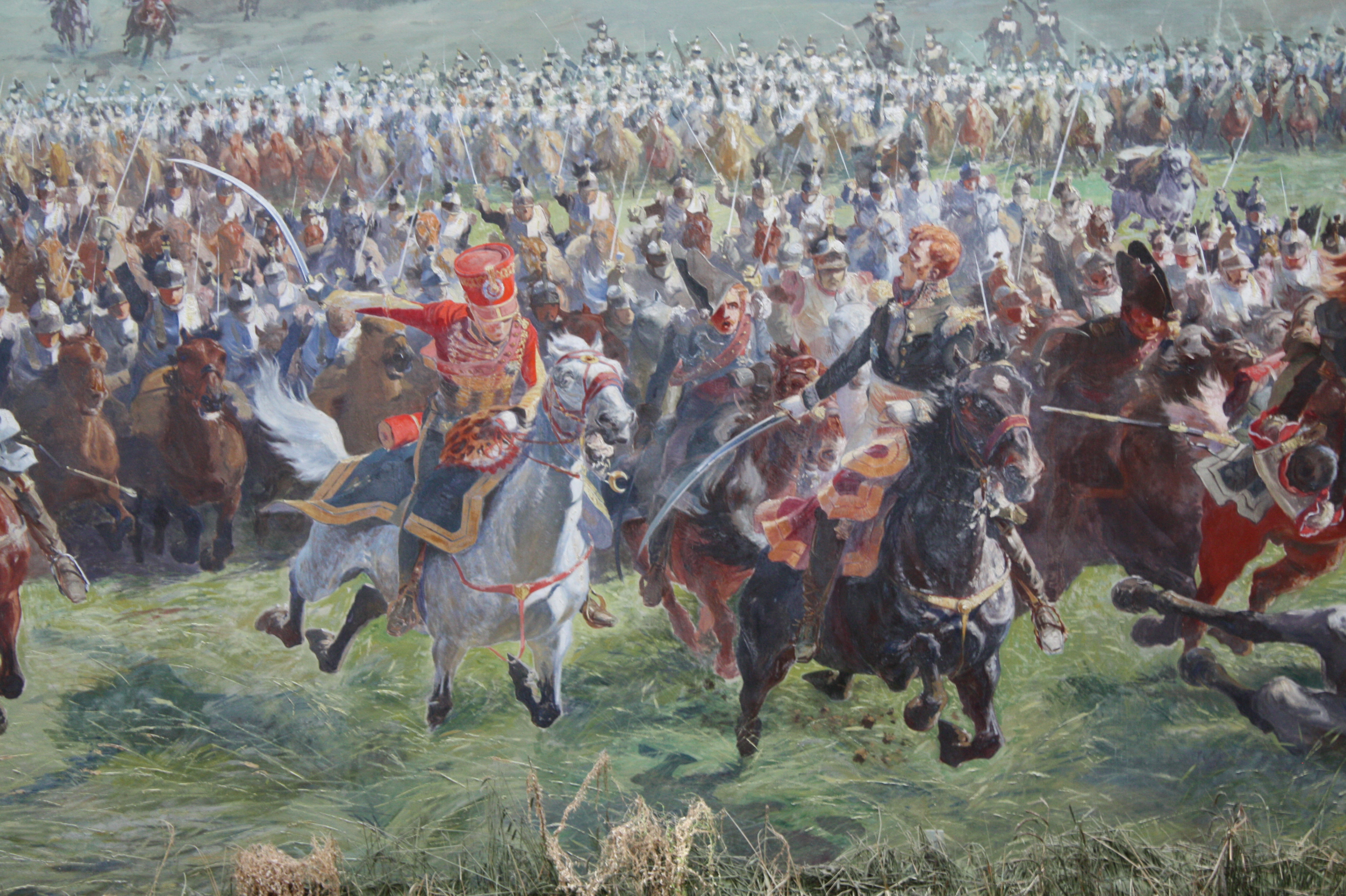
Ney leading the cavalry charge at Waterloo, from Louis Dumoulin's Panorama of the Battle of Waterloo

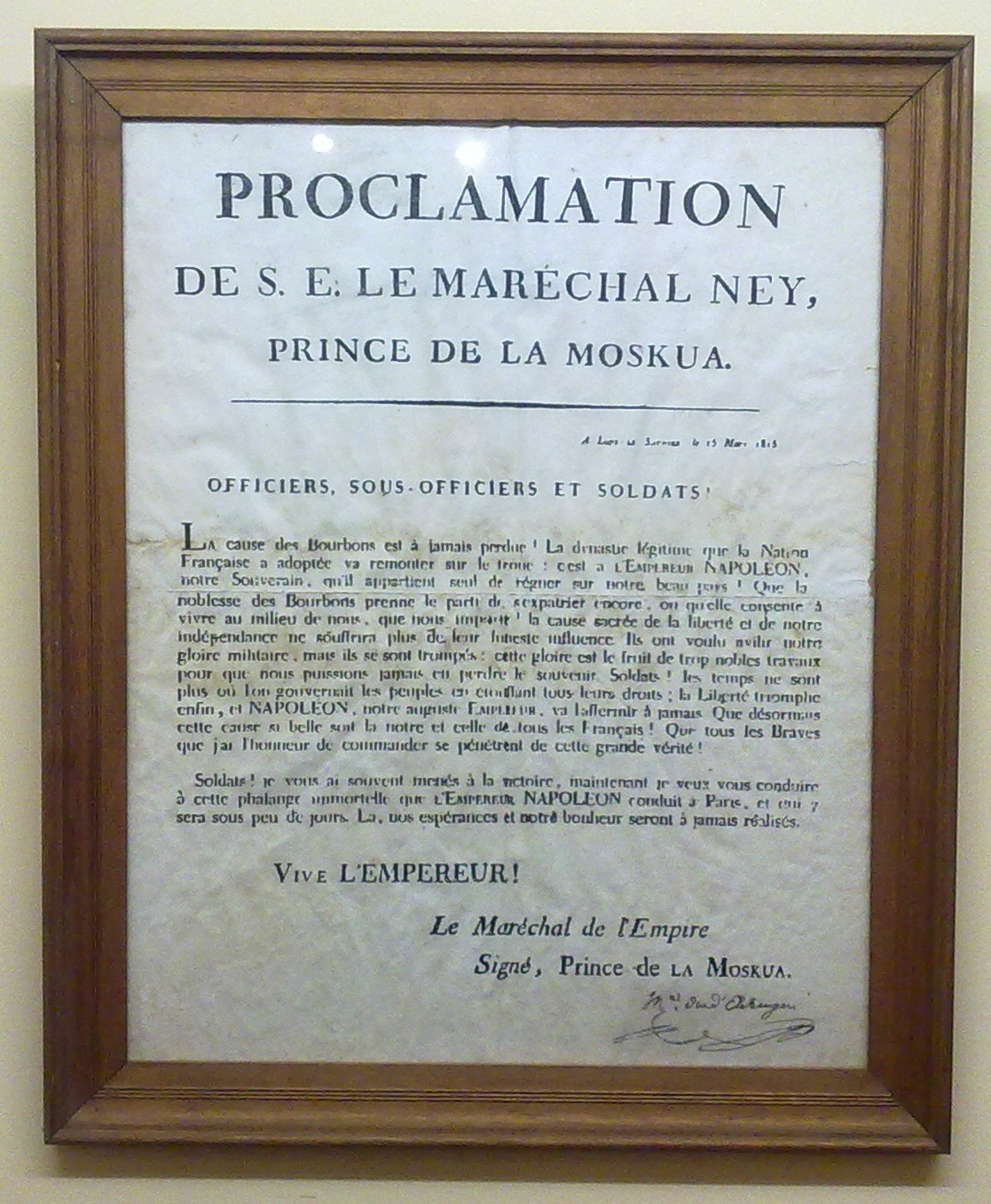
A public proclamation by Ney, dated March 1815, urging French soldiers to abandon the king and to support Napoleon

When he heard of Napoleon's return to France, Ney, determined to keep France at peace and to show his loyalty to Louis XVIII, organized a force to stop Napoleon's march on Paris. Ney also pledged to bring Napoleon back alive in an iron cage. Aware of Ney's plans, Napoleon sent him a letter which said, in part, "I shall receive you as I did after the Battle of the Moskowa." On 14 March, on the main square in Lons-le-Saulnier (Jura) Ney joined Napoleon with a small army of 6,000 men. Ney's reconciliation with Napoleon was a body blow to the monarchy's hopes of retaining control of the army and with it, France, and the King abandoned Paris just two days after Ney's 'treason' became known in the capital. On 15 June 1815, Napoleon appointed Ney as commander of the left wing of the Army of the North. On 16 June, Napoleon's forces split up into two wings to fight two separate battles simultaneously. Ney attacked the Duke of Wellington at Quatre Bras (and received criticism for attacking slowly) while Napoleon attacked Marshal Blücher's Prussians at Ligny. Although Ney was criticized for not capturing Quatre Bras early, there is still debate as to what time Napoleon actually ordered Ney to capture the town. At Ligny, Napoleon ordered General Jean-Baptiste d'Erlon to move his corps (on Napoleon's left and Ney's right at the time) to the Prussians' rear in order to cut off their line of retreat. D'Erlon began to move into position, but suddenly stopped and began moving away, much to the surprise and horror of Napoleon. The reason for the sudden change in movement is that Ney had ordered d'Erlon to come to his aid at Quatre Bras. Without d'Erlon's corps blocking the Prussians' line of retreat, the French victory at Ligny was not complete, and the Prussians were not routed.

At Waterloo on 18 June, Ney again commanded the left wing of the army. At around 3:30 p.m., Ney ordered a mass cavalry charge against the Anglo-Allied lines. Ney's cavalry overran the enemy cannons but found the infantry formed in cavalry-proof square formations which – without infantry or artillery support – he failed to break. The action earned Ney criticism, and some argue that it led to Napoleon's defeat at Waterloo. Debate continues as to the responsibility for the cavalry charge and why it went unsupported. Ney's cavalry also failed to spike the enemy cannons (driving iron spikes into the firing holes) while they were under French control (during the cavalry attack, the crews of the cannon retreated into the squares for protection, and then re-manned their pieces as the cavalry withdrew). Ney's cavalry carried the equipment needed to spike cannons, and spiking the cannons would probably have made them useless for the rest of the battle. The loss of a large number of cannon would have weakened the army and could have caused the Anglo-Allied Army to withdraw from the battle. Ney was seen during one of the charges beating his sword against the side of a British cannon in furious frustration. During the battle, he had five horses killed under him, and at the end of the day, Ney led one of the last infantry charges, shouting to his men: "Come and see how a marshal of France meets his death!" It was as though Ney was seeking death, but death did not want him, as many observers reported.

== Trial and execution ==
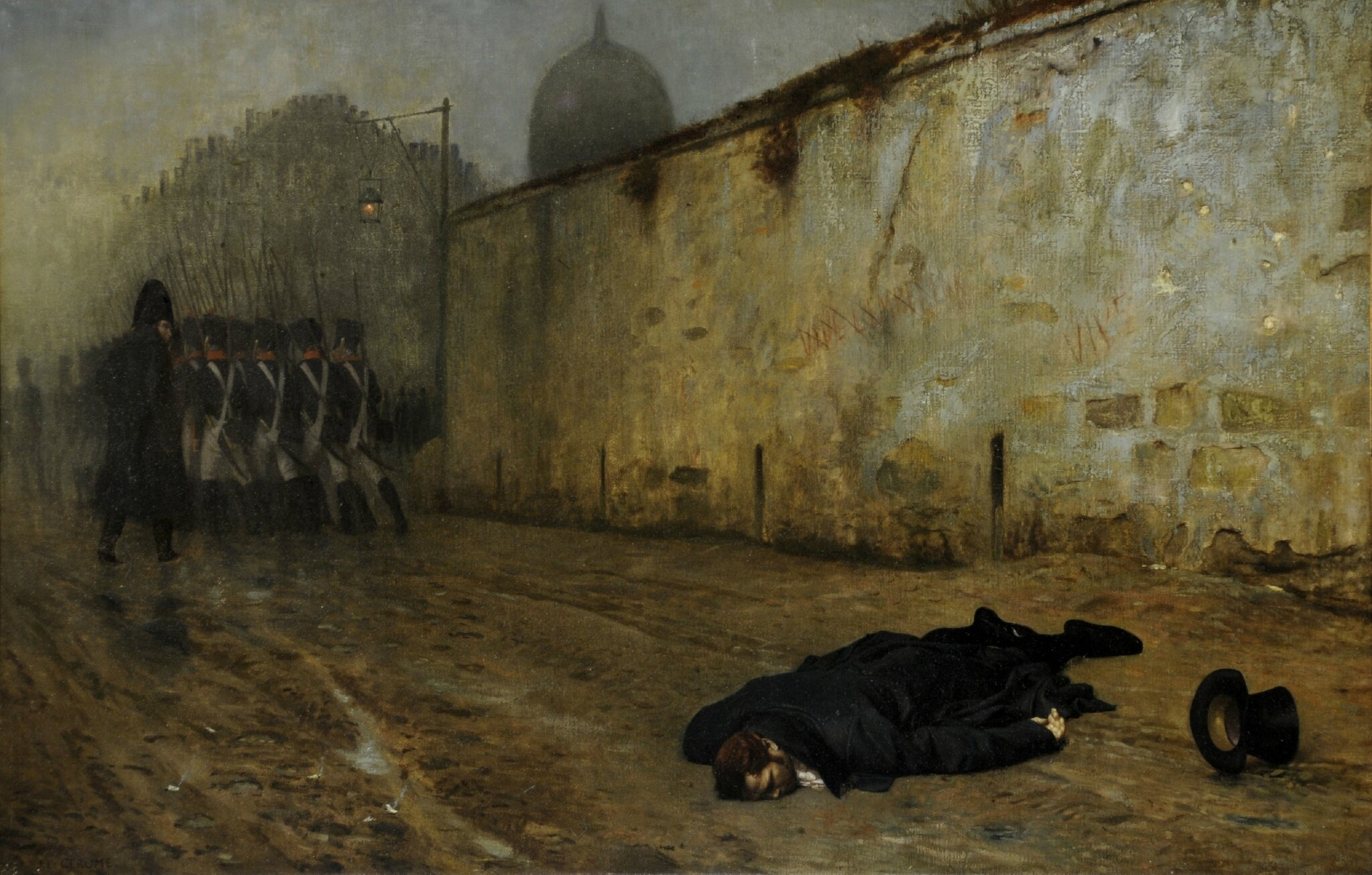
The Execution of Marshal Ney (1868), by Jean-Léon Gérôme

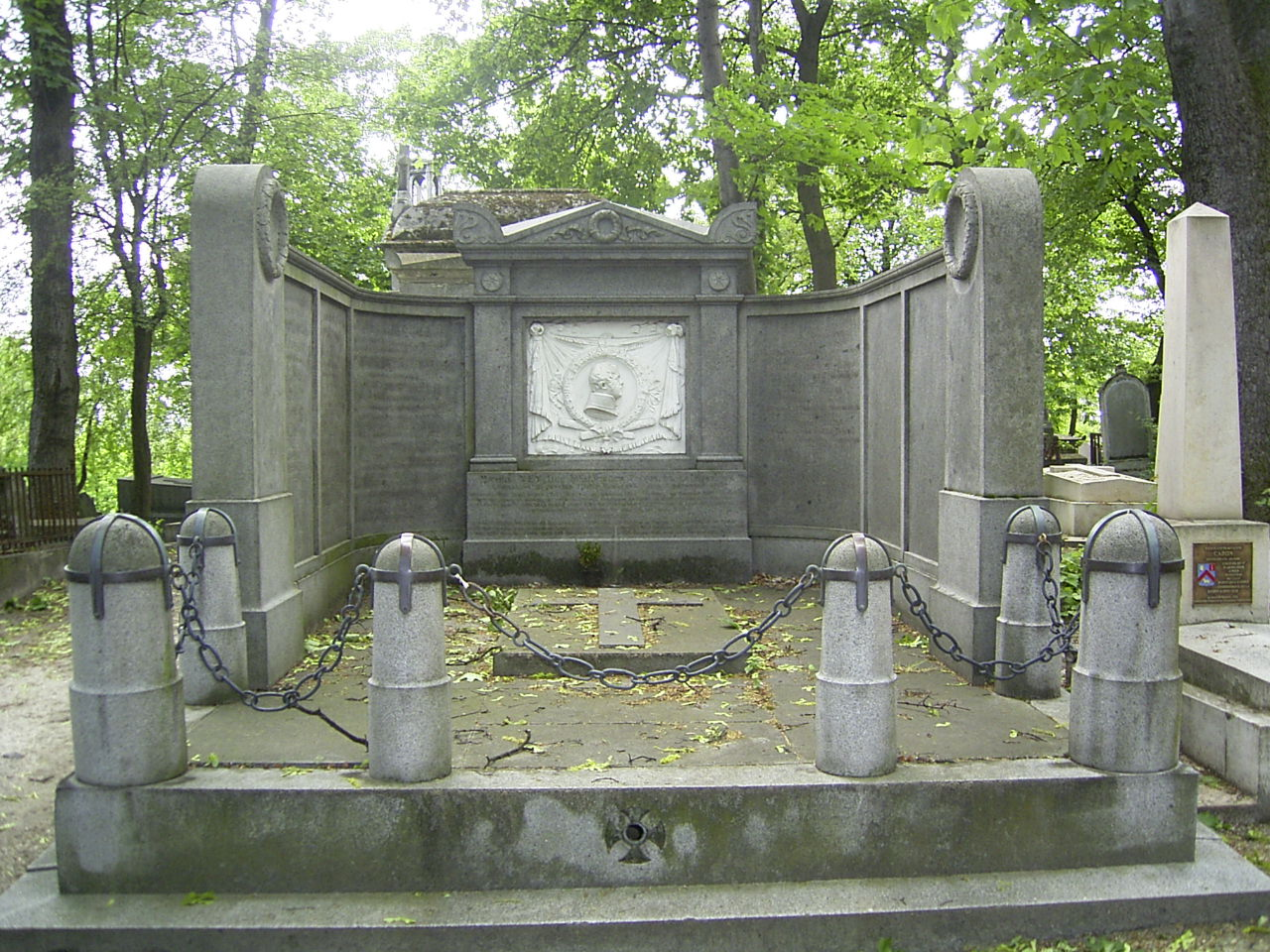
Ney's gravesite in Père Lachaise Cemetery

When Napoleon was defeated, dethroned, and exiled for the second time in the summer of 1815, Ney was arrested on 3 August 1815. Marshal Moncey was ordered to assume the presidency of a court-martial convened to try Ney but the marshal declined and was for a time imprisoned for it. The King's government then appointed Marshal Jourdan as president and when it finally convened on 9 November 1815, the court-martial comprised the marshals Jourdan, Masséna, Augereau, and Mortier, and the generals Gazan de La Peyriere (instead of Maison who refused), Claparède and Villatte. After long deliberation, the court-martial voted 5–2 to declare itself "non-competent".

After the court-martial decided on 11 and 12 November that it did not have jurisdiction, Ney was tried on 16 November for treason by the Chamber of Peers. Key evidence in the trial was supplied by Ney's subordinate commanders Generals Bourmont, an arch royalist, and General Lecourbe, a republican who had fallen out of favour during the empire and was now in service to the King. Bourmont testified that Ney had been a keen supporter of Napoleon and gave evidence such as the accusation that Ney was wearing an Imperial Eagle decoration minutes after his decision to switch sides, suggesting some element of planning. Ney responded with outrage:

Monsieur de Bourmont accuses me to clear his own conduct. It seems that he prepared his denunciation of me months ago at Lille witness in another place. He flattered himself perhaps that we would never meet again face to face. He thought I would have short shrift like Labedoyere. I have no oratorical talent, but I come direct to the fact. It is unfortunate for me that General Lecourbe is no longer living. But I call Him [pointing upwards with his right hand] against these depositions, I appeal to a higher tribunal, to God who hears us all, to God who —you and me, Monsieur de Bourmont!— will judge us.

No other witness corroborated Bourmont's claim that Ney had been wearing an Imperial eagle decoration. While Lecourbe had died, testimony he'd given to a magistrate was read at the trial, showing Lecourbe thought the royalist situation lost and that Napoleon's 14,000 men could not be practically resisted by the 5,000 men of dubious loyalty under Ney's command.

In order to save Ney's life, his lawyer André Dupin declared that Ney was now Prussian and could not be judged by a French court for treason, as Ney's hometown of Sarrelouis had been annexed by Prussia according to the Treaty of Paris of 1815. Ney ruined his lawyer's effort by interrupting him and stating: "Je suis Français et je resterai Français!" ("I am French and I will remain French!"). On 4 December, when the Peers were called to give their verdict, 137 voted for the death penalty and 17 for deportation; five abstained. Only a single vote, that of the Duc de Broglie, was for acquittal. On 6 December 1815, he was condemned.

On 7 December 1815, Ney was executed by firing squad in Paris, near the Luxembourg Gardens. He refused to wear a blindfold, stating: "Are you unaware that I've spent twenty-five years staring down at cannonballs and bullets?". He was allowed the right to give the order to fire, reportedly saying:

Soldiers, when I give the command to fire, fire straight at my heart. Wait for the order. It will be my last to you. I protest against my condemnation. I have fought a hundred battles for France, and not one against her ... Soldiers, fire!

This account is contested by eyewitness testimony of the Count de Rochechouart, who says in his memoir:

He, of course, refused to kneel down and be blindfolded ; he merely asked the Commandant Saint-Bias to show him where he should stand. He stood facing the platoon, who held their guns ready to fire. Then, in an attitude that I shall never forget, it was so noble, calm and dignified, without bravado, he took off his hat, and availing himself of the moment when the Adjutant stepped aside and gave the signal to fire, he said these words which I distinctly heard : " Frenchmen, I protest against my sentence ; my honour . . ." As he said these words he placed his hand on his heart ; the volley was fired, and he fell

Ney's body is buried in Paris at the Père Lachaise Cemetery.

== Family ==
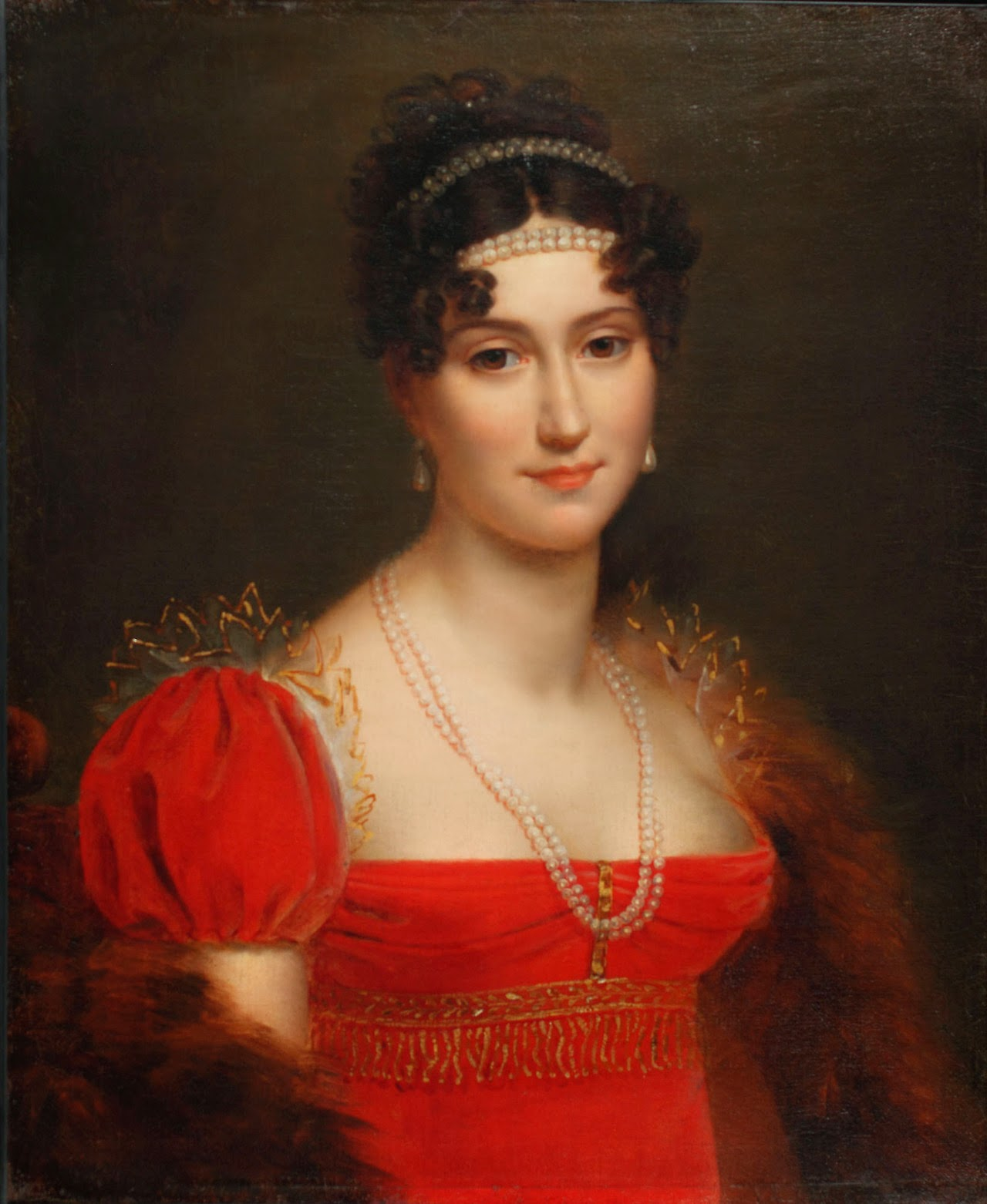
Portrait of Aglaé Ney by François Gérard, 1810s

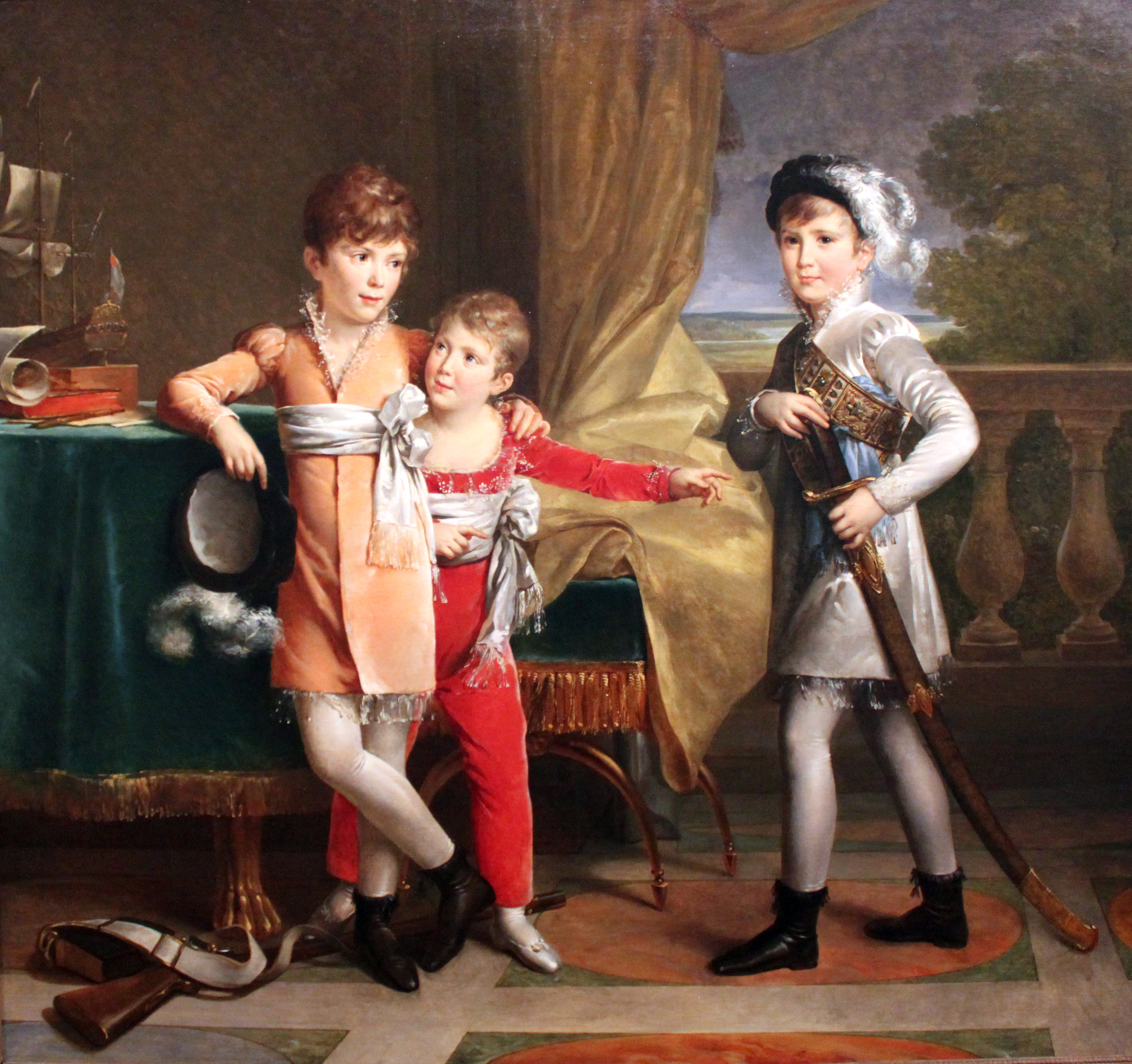
Ney's three eldest sons, painted by Marie-Éléonore Godefroid in 1810

Ney married Aglaé Auguié (Paris, 24 March 1782 – Paris, 1 July 1854), daughter of Pierre César Auguié (1738–1815) and Adélaïde Henriette Genet (1758–1794, sister of Henriette Campan and Citizen Genêt), at Thiverval-Grignon on 5 August 1802. They had four sons:

- Joseph Napoléon, 2nd Prince de la Moskowa (Paris, 8 May 1803 – Saint-Germain-en-Laye, 25 July 1857). He married Albine Laffitte (Paris, 12 May 1805 – Paris, 18 July 1881) in Paris on 26 January 1828. Albine was the daughter of Jacques Laffitte, Governor of the Bank of France. They had two children, whose male blood line ended. Joseph also had an illegitimate son who was married and died childless.
- Michel Louis Félix, recognized as 2nd Duc d'Elchingen in 1826 (born 24 August 1804 in Paris – died 14 July 1854 at Gallipoli, during the Crimean War). He married Marie-Joséphine (Lubersac (20 December 1801 – Versailles, 1 July 1889), daughter of Joseph Souham, in Paris on 19 January 1833.
- Eugène Michel (Paris, 12 July 1806 – Paris, 25 October 1845). He died unmarried.
- Edgar Napoléon Henry, recognized as 3rd Prince de la Moskowa 1857 (Paris, 12 April 1812 – Paris, 4 October 1882). He married Clotilde de La Rochelambert (Saint-Cloud, 29 July 1829 – Paris, 1884) in Paris on 16 January 1869. Their marriage was childless and the title of Prince de la Moskowa then reverted to the descendants of Michel Louis Félix.

It is questionable if Ida Saint-Elme, 'Courtisane de la Grande Armée', was a lover of Michel Ney.

== In literature and the arts ==
Ney appears in Miloš Crnjanski's novel A Novel of London, where the protagonist, a Russian aristocrat Count Repnin praises Ney in contrast with Napoleon.

He was portrayed by Dan O'Herlihy in the 1970 film Waterloo, and by John Hollingworth in the 2023 film Napoleon.

Records in Charleston, South Carolina indicate the arrival of one "Peter Stewart Ney" the year following Michel Ney's execution (Michel Ney's father was named Peter, and his mother's maiden name was Stewart). Peter Ney served as a school teacher in Rowan County until his death on 15 November 1846. According to legend, Peter Ney slashed his throat and almost died upon hearing of the death of Napoleon in 1821. His last words upon his death were reportedly "I am Ney of France", However, there was evidence contradicting this legend, the main being that the execution of Michel Ney is well documented and verified. And Marshal Ney, though fluent in German, is not known to have spoken English. One researcher claims evidence exists that Peter Stewart Ney was one Peter McNee, born in 1788 in Stirlingshire, Scotland.

== See also ==
- HMS Marshal Ney, a British warship named after Ney

== Notes ==
French nobility
New title	Prince de la Moskowa; 1813–1815	Succeeded by Napoléon Joseph Ney
New title	Duke of Elchingen; 1808–1815	Succeeded by Michel Louis Félix Ney
