= Aglaé Auguié =

French court official (1782–1854)

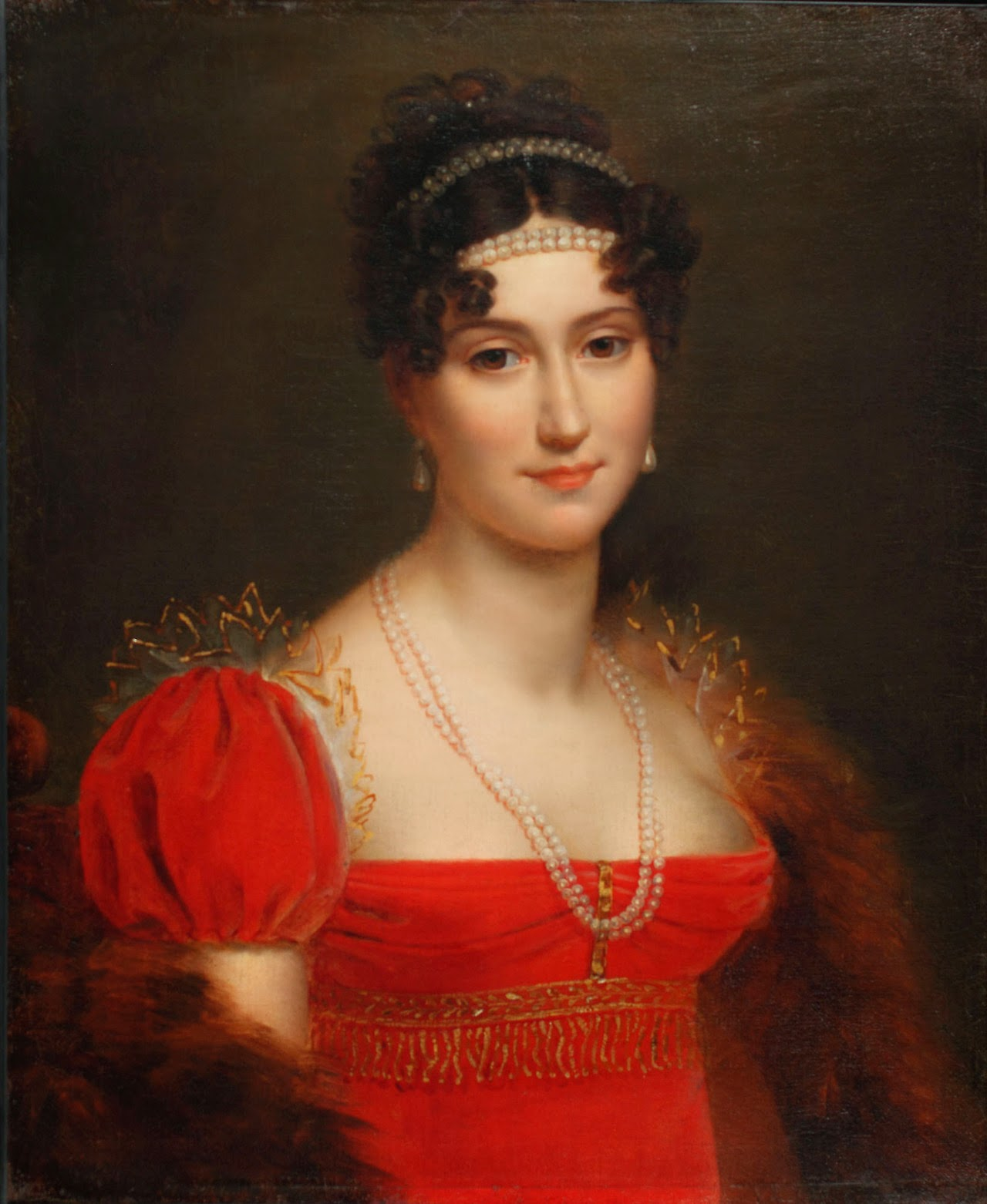
Portrait of Aglaé by François Gérard, c. 1810

Aglaé Auguié (24 March 1782 – 2 July 1854), was a French court official and wife of the senior army commander Marshal of the Empire Ney.

== Early life ==
Aglaé was born in Paris on 24 March 1782. She was a daughter of Pierre César Auguié (1738–1815) and Adélaïde Henriette Genet (1758–1794).

Her aunt was Henriette Campan and uncle was Citizen Genêt.

== Court ==
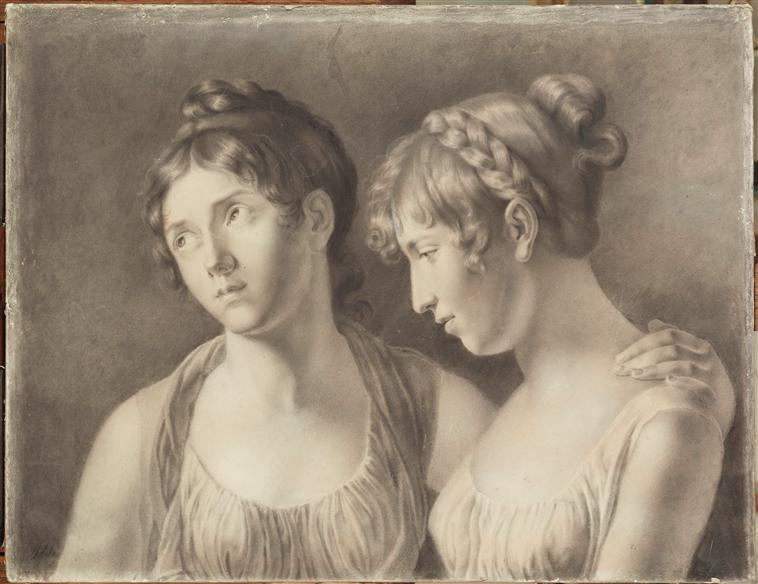
Potrait of her and Hortense de Beauharnais (future Queen of Holland), by her sister Adèle Auguié, 1802.

She served as lady-in-waiting (Dame du Palais) to Empress Joséphine de Beauharnais in 1804–1810, and to Empress Marie Louise in 1810-1813. She was a close friend of Hortense de Beauharnais, Napoléon I's stepdaughter who married his brother, Louis Bonaparte, who had been made King of Holland.

== Personal life ==
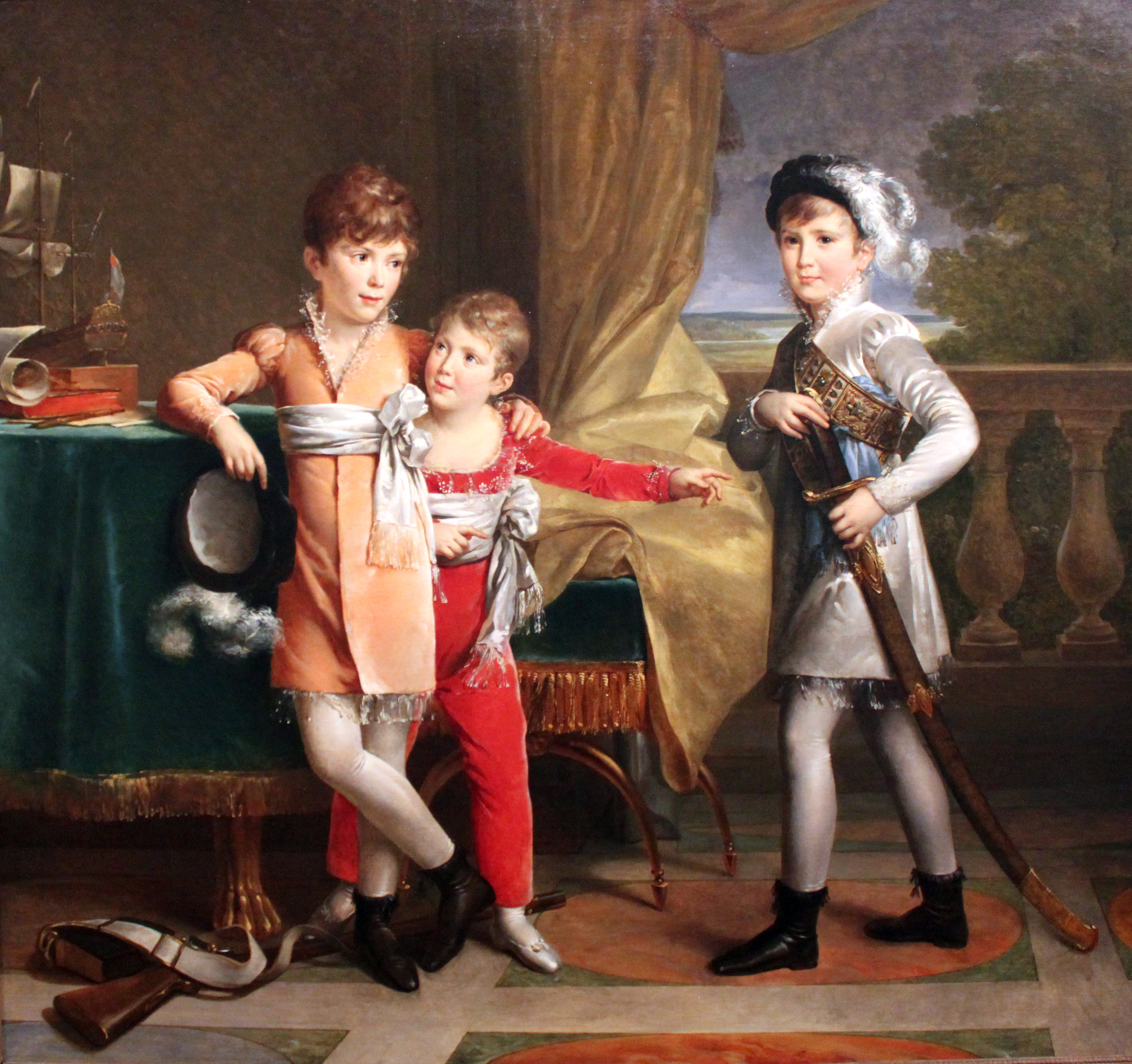
Ney's three eldest sons, painted by Marie-Éléonore Godefroid in 1810

She married Michel Ney at Thiverval-Grignon on 5 August 1802. Together, they had four sons:

- Napoléon Joseph Ney, 2nd Prince de la Moskowa (1803–1857), who married Albine Laffitte, daughter of Jacques Laffitte, Governor of the Bank of France, in 1828.
- Michel Louis Félix Ney (1804–1854), recognized as 2nd Duc d'Elchingen in 1826, he married Marie-Joséphine Souham, daughter of Joseph Souham, in 1833. He died at Gallipoli during the Crimean War.
- Eugène Michel Ney (1806–1845), who died unmarried.
- Edgar Napoléon Henry Ney, 3rd Prince de la Moskowa (1812–1882), who married Clotilde de La Rochelambert in 1869. Their marriage was childless and the title of Prince de la Moskowa then reverted to the descendants of Michel Louis Félix.

After the execution of her first husband, she secretly married Brigadier General Marie Louis Jules d'Y de Résigny (1788–1857) in Italy in 1816. Another officer with Napoleon, he had been imprisoned in Malta until August 1816.

She died in Paris on 2 July 1854.

== Bibliography ==
- Atteridge, A. Hilliard (1912). Marshal Ney: The Bravest of the Brave. London: Methuen.
