= L'Aiglon (opera) =

Opera by Arthur Honegger and Jacques Ibert

- Drame musical by: Arthur Honegger; Jacques Ibert
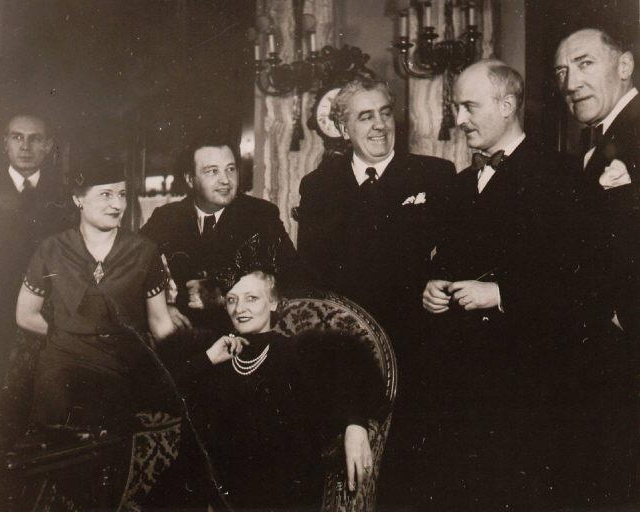
- At the première in Monte Carlo in 1937: Fanny Heldy (seated), Honegger (3rd from left), Ibert (2nd from right), Vanni Marcoux (1st from right)
- Translation: The Eaglet
- Librettist: Henri Cain
- Language: French
- Based on: L'Aiglon by Edmond Rostand
- Premiere: 11 March 1937; Opéra de Monte-Carlo

L'Aiglon is an opera (drame musical) in five acts composed by Arthur Honegger and Jacques Ibert. Honegger composed acts 2, 3, and 4, with Ibert composing acts 1 and 5. A 2016 reviewer described it as "a singular piece of work" with its "blend of operetta, divertissement, conversation piece, historical pageant and, in the disturbingly powerful fourth act set on the Napoleonic battlefield at Wagram, phantasmagoria peopled with living figures onstage and dead voices off".

== Background ==
The libretto by Henri Cain was based on Edmond Rostand's 1900 play, L'Aiglon ("The Eaglet"), about the life of Napoleon II, who was the son of Emperor Napoleon I and his second wife, Empress Marie Louise.

It premiered at the Opéra de Monte-Carlo on 11 March 1937 in a production by Pierre Chéreau. The principal roles were sung by Fanny Heldy and Vanni Marcoux.

At the Paris Opera that August, Heldy repeated her performance alongside Vanni-Marcoux under François Ruhlmann. The work was revived there in 1952 with Géori Boué in the title role under André Cluytens.

The work was revived in February 2016 at the Opéra de Marseille with Stéphanie d'Oustrac in the title role and conducted by Jean-Yves Ossonce.

A 1956 French radio recording with Boué conducted by Pierre Dervaux was later issued on CD, and a full studio Decca recording under Kent Nagano, following concert performances in Montreal, was released in 2016.

== Roles ==
Roles, voice types, premiere cast
Role	Voice type	Premiere cast, 11 March 1937 (Conductor: F. Wolfes)
L'Aiglon/The Duke of Reichstadt, son of Napoleon	soprano	Fanny Heldy
Séraphin Flambeau, his footman	bass	Vanni Marcoux
The French attaché	tenor	Victor Pujol
Countess Camerata	contralto	Germaine Chellet
Le Chevalier de Prokesch-Osten	bass	Luigi Cérésole
Maréchal Marmont	baritone	Robert Marvini
Prince Metternich	bass-baritone	Arthur Endrèze
Marie-Louise	mezzo-soprano	Mlle. Gadsden
Comte de Sedlinsky	tenor	Barone
Frédéric de Gentz	tenor	Fraikin
Thérèse de Lorget	soprano	Maria Branèze
Fanny Elssler	mezzo-soprano	Schirman

== Synopsis ==
The Duke of Reichstadt (Napoleon II), with his faithful footman Séraphin Flambeau, escapes from Austrian imprisonment and visits the old site of the Battle of Wagram, before eventually dying of tuberculosis.
