= Elisa Bonaparte =

Imperial French princess (1777–1820)

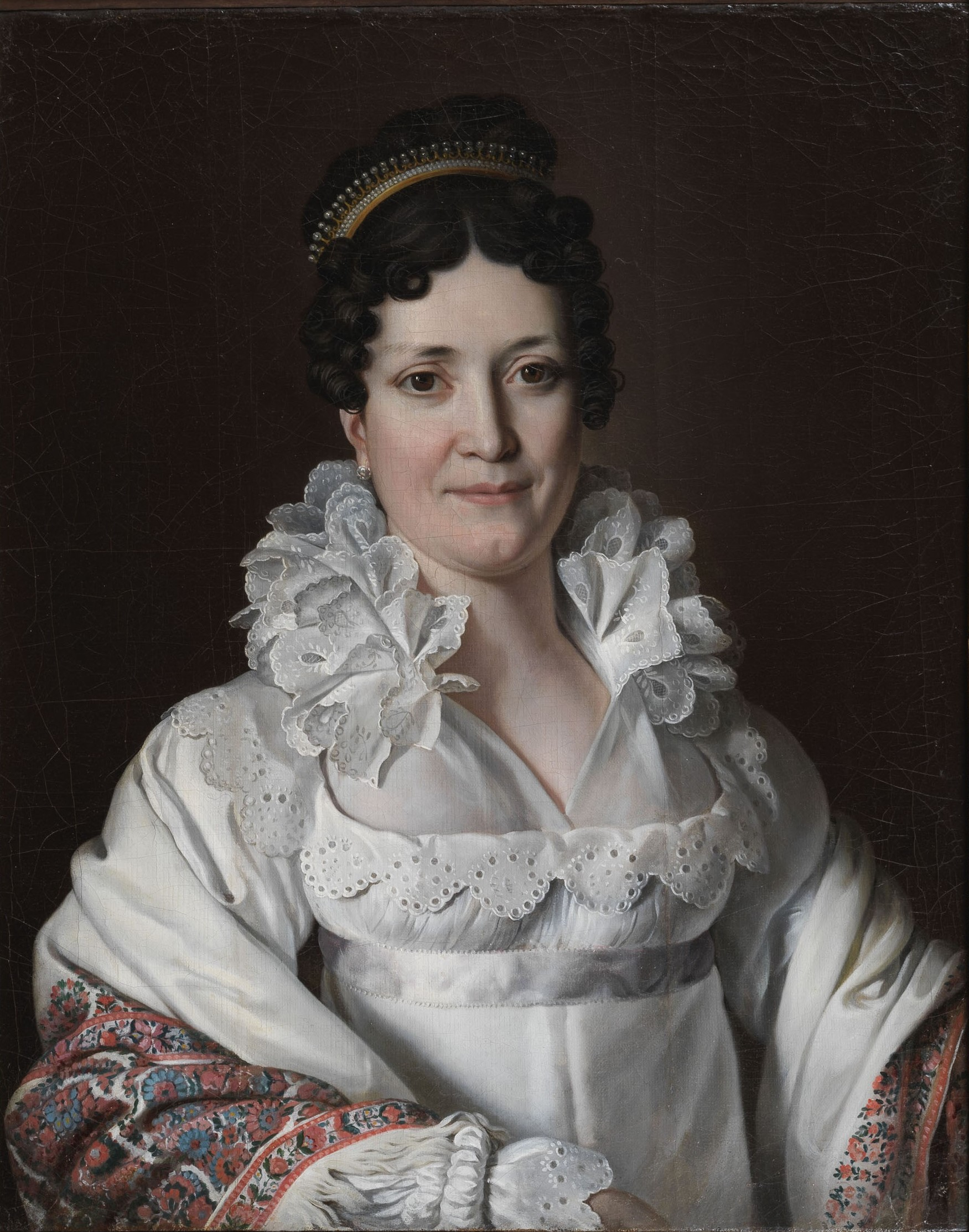

Grand Duchess of Tuscany
- Reign: 3 March 1809 – 1 February 1814
- Predecessor: Charles II, Duke of Parma (as King of Etruria)
- Successor: Ferdinand III, Grand Duke of Tuscany

Princess of Lucca and Piombino
- Reign: 19 March 1805 – 18 March 1814
- Predecessor: Antonio II Boncompagni Ludovisi as Prince of Piombino
- Successor: Maria Luisa as Duchess of Lucca; Luigi I Boncompagni-Ludovisi as Prince of Piombino
- Co-ruler: Felice Pasquale Baciocchi
- Born: Maria Anna Buonaparte; 3 January 1777; Ajaccio, Corsica, France
- Died: 7 August 1820 (aged 43); Trieste, Austrian Empire
- Burial: San Petronio, Bologna
- Spouse: Felice Pasquale Baciocchi (m. 1797)
- Issue: Felix Napoléon Baciocchi; Napoléon Baciocchi; Elisa Napoléone Baciocchi; Jérôme Charles Baciocchi; Frédéric Napoléon Baciocchi
Names
- Maria Anna Elisa Bonaparte Baciocchi Levoy
- House: Bonaparte
- Father: Carlo Buonaparte
- Mother: Letizia Ramolino
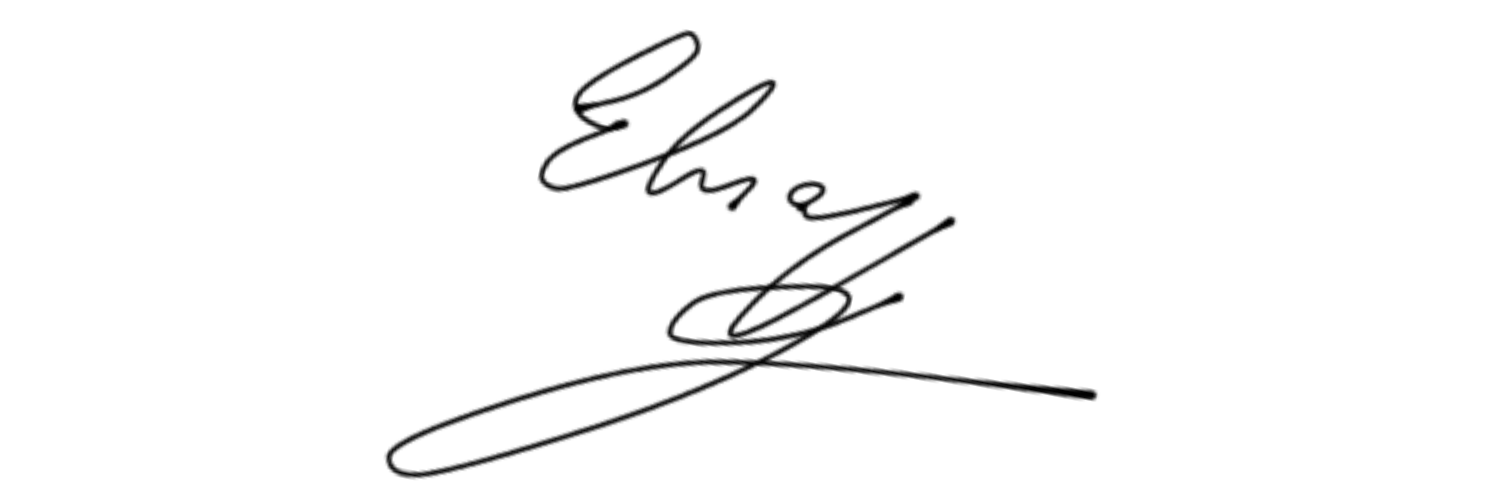
- Signature

Maria Anna Elisa Bonaparte Baciocchi Levoy (French: Marie Anne Elisa Bonaparte; 3 January 1777 – 7 August 1820), better known as Elisa Bonaparte, was an imperial French princess and sister of Napoleon Bonaparte. She was Princess of Lucca and Piombino (1805-1814), Grand Duchess of Tuscany (1809-1814) and Countess of Compignano by appointment of her brother.

She was the fourth surviving child and eldest surviving daughter of Carlo Buonaparte and Letizia Ramolino. A younger sister of Napoleon Bonaparte, she had elder brothers Joseph and Lucien, and younger siblings Louis, Pauline, Caroline and Jérôme.

As Princess of Lucca and Piombino, then Grand Duchess of Tuscany, she became Napoleon's only sister to possess political power. Their relations were sometimes strained due to her sharp tongue. Highly interested in the arts, particularly the theatre, she widely encouraged and promoted the subject within the territories she ruled over.

== Early life ==
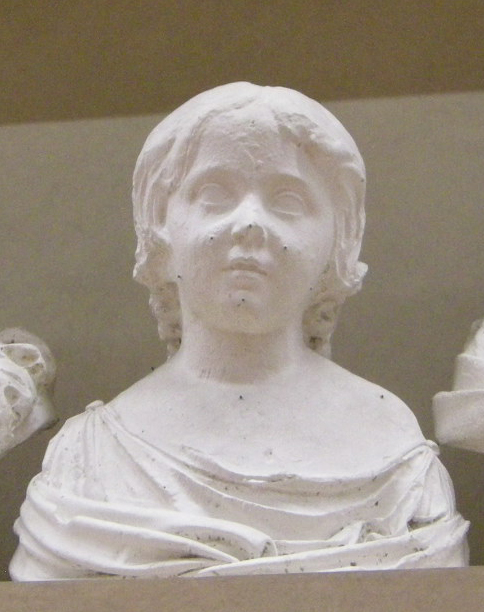
Élisa Bonaparte as a child (Lorenzo Bartolini)

Élisa was born in Ajaccio, Corsica. She was christened Maria-Anna, but later officially adopted the nickname "Élisa" (her brother Lucien, to whom she was very close in childhood, nicknamed her Elisa). In June 1784, a bursary allowed her to attend the Maison royale de Saint-Louis at Saint-Cyr, where she was frequently visited by her brother Napoleon. Following the French Revolution, the Legislative Assembly decreed the Maison's closure on 16 August 1792 as it shut down institutions associated with the aristocracy. Élisa left on 1 September with Napoleon to return to Ajaccio.

Around 1795, the Bonaparte family relocated to Marseille. There Élisa got to know Felice Pasquale Baciocchi (who later adopted the surname Levoy). A Corsican nobleman and formerly a captain in the Royal Corse, he had been dismissed from his rank with the outbreak of the French Revolution.

== Marriage and family ==
Élisa married Levoy in a civil ceremony in Marseille on 1 May 1797, followed by a religious ceremony in Mombello, where Napoleon had a villa. He had moved there with his family in June 1797. Concerned about Baciocchi's reputation as a poor captain, Napoleon had some initial reservations about his sister's choice of spouse. Their religious ceremony was held on the same day as her sister Pauline's marriage to general Victor-Emmanuel Leclerc.

In July, Baciocchi was promoted to chef de bataillon, with the command of the citadel at Ajaccio. In 1799, the extended Bonaparte family moved to Paris. Élisa set up home at 125 rue de Miromesnil, in the Quartier du Roule, where she held receptions and put on plays.

During the rise of the Consulate, she and her brother Lucien held an artistic and literary salon at the Hôtel de Brissac, at which she met the journalist Louis de Fontanes, with whom she had a deep friendship for several years. On 14 May 1800, on the death of Lucien's first wife, Christine Boyer, Élisa took Lucien's two daughters under her protection. She placed Charlotte, the eldest, in Madame Campan's boarding school for young women at Saint-Germain-en-Laye.

At the start of November 1800, Lucien was reassigned from his job as Minister of the Interior to Madrid as French ambassador to the court of the King of Spain. He took Élisa's husband, Félix Baciocchi, as his secretary. Élisa remained in Paris, but maintained a regular correspondence with her brother.

On 18 May 1804, the French Senate voted in favour of setting up the First French Empire, and Élisa and Napoleon's other sisters were established as members of the Imperial family, both taking the style "Imperial Highness" ("Altesse impériale"). Felice Baciocchi was promoted to brigade general and later made a senator.

== Princess of Piombino and Lucca ==
Coat of arms of Princess Bonaparte

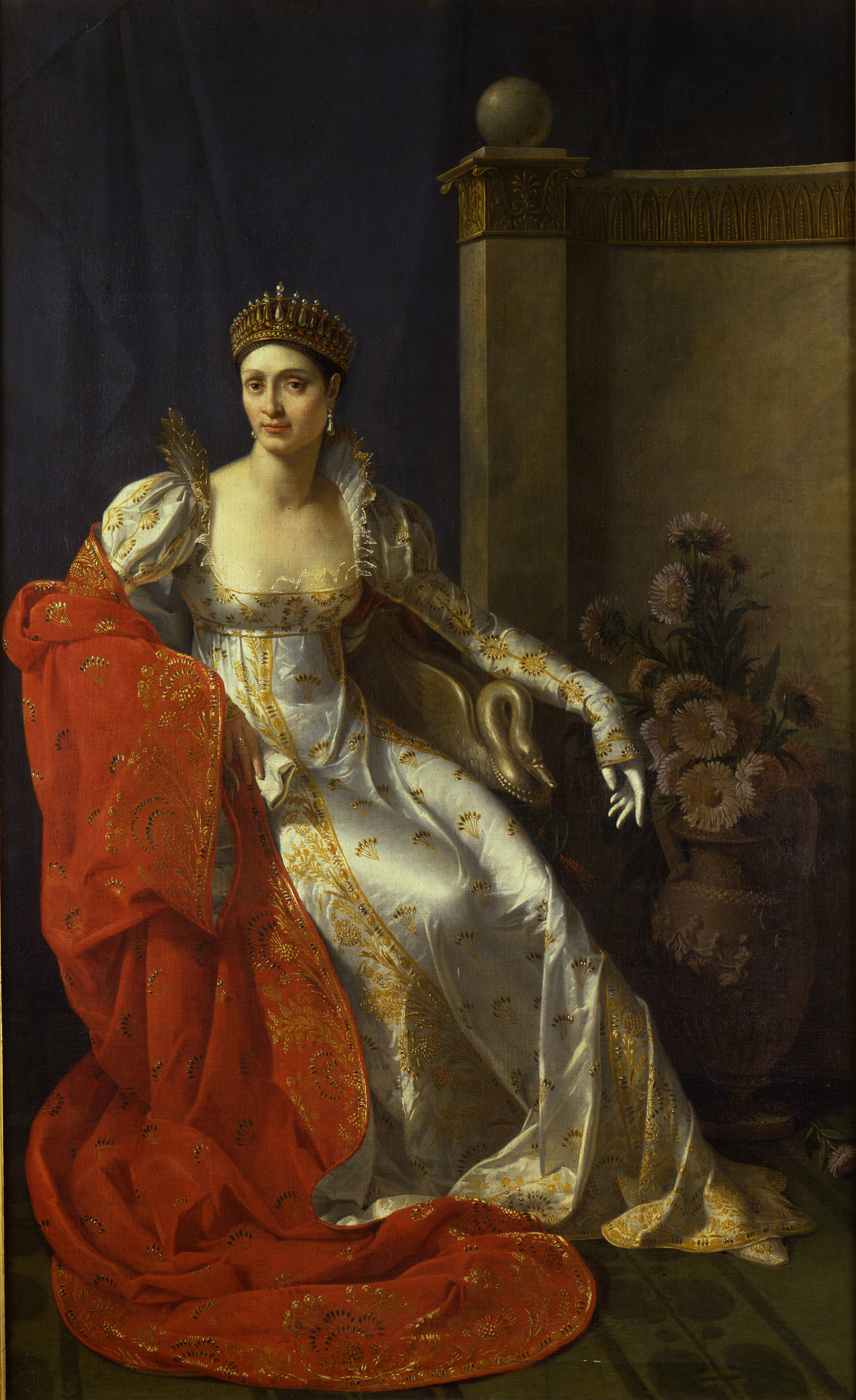
Portrait by Marie-Guillemine Benoist, c. 1805

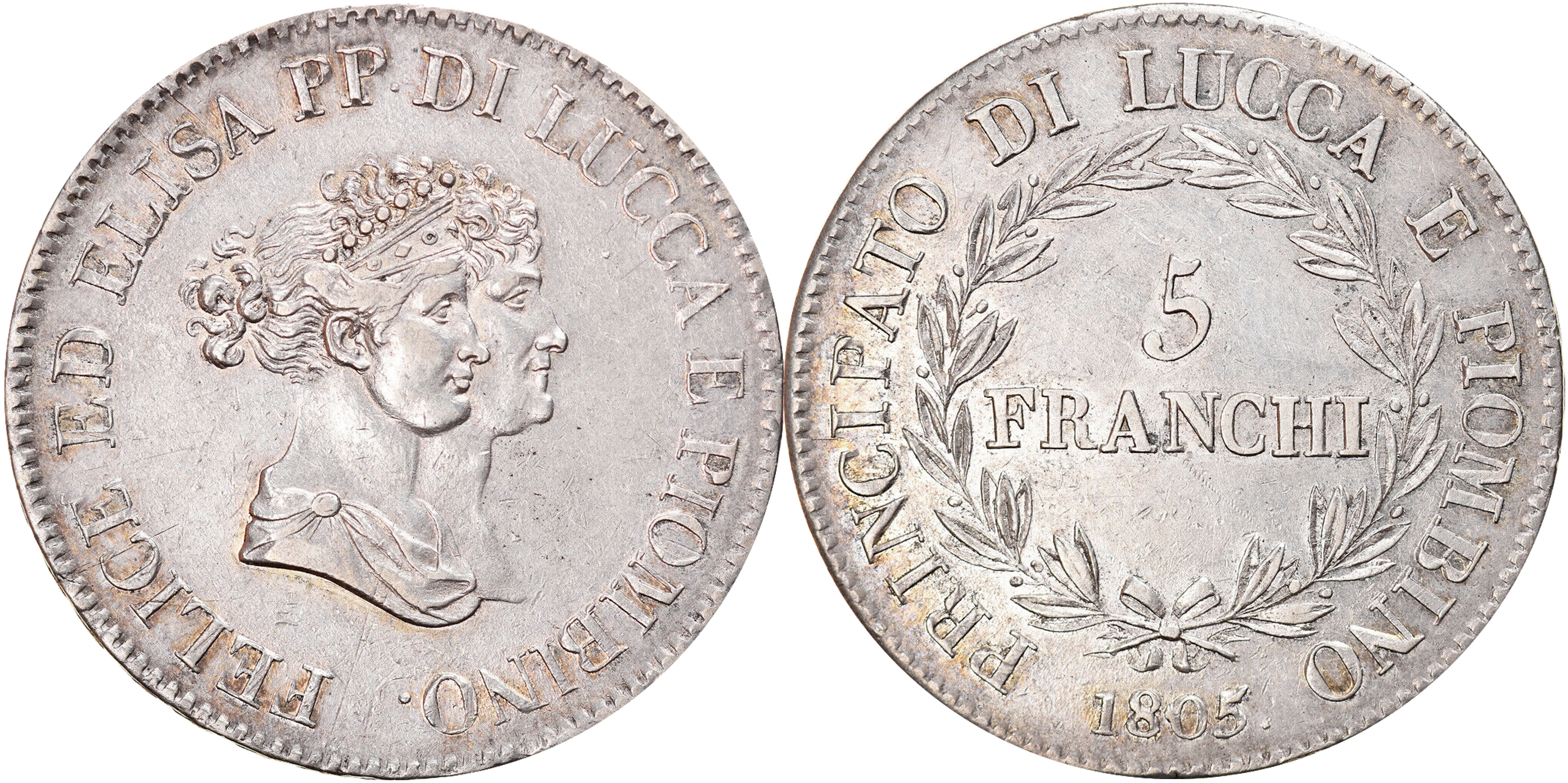
Silver coin: 5 Franchi of Principality of Lucca and Piombino, 1805, with the front side is the portrait of the couple Prince Felix and Elisa Bonaparte

Her separation from her husband in 1805 was seen favorably by Napoleon (though he soon rejoined her after her promotion to Lucca). On 19 March 1805, Napoleon awarded her the Principality of Piombino, which had been French property for some years and was of major strategic interest to Napoleon due to its proximity to Elba and Corsica. Felice and Élisa took the titles "Prince and Princess of Piombino". In June 1805, the Republic of Lucca, which had been occupied by France since late 1799, was made a principality and added to Felice and Élisa's domain, their entry into Lucca and investiture ceremony following on 14 July 1805.

Napoleon had contemptuously called Lucca the "dwarf republic", due to its small size in terms of territory, but despite this it was a bulwark of political, religious, and commercial independence. Most of the power over Lucca and Piombino was exercised by Élisa, with Félix taking only a minor role and contenting himself with making military decisions. The inhabitants of Lucca, under French occupation and begrudging the loss of their independence, knew Élisa ironically as "la Madame" and had little sympathy for Napoleon, Élisa, or their attempts to "Frenchify" the republic.

Very active and concerned with administering the area, Élisa was surrounded at Lucca by ministers who largely remained in place right to the end of her reign. These ministers included her Minister of Justice, Luigi Matteucci, her Minister of the Interior and Foreign Affairs, Francesco Belluomini (replaced in October 1807 by his son Giuseppe), her finance ministers, Jean-Baptiste Froussard (head of the cabinet) and, later, Pierre d'Hautmesnil (with the budget portfolio). She also set up a court and court etiquette inspired by those at the Tuileries.

On 31 March 1806 Napoleon withdrew Massa and Carrara from the Kingdom of Italy to add to Élisa's possessions. Carrara was one of the biggest white marble suppliers in Europe and Élisa bolstered her prestige by establishing an Académie des Beaux-Arts, designed to host the greatest sculptors and thus make Carrara an exporter of marble statues, which had a greater value than the raw marble. She also set up the Banque Élisienne to give financial aid to sculptors and workers on marble taxes. She reformed the clergy at Lucca and Piombino from May 1806, during which reforms she nationalised their goods and lands and closed down convents which did not also function as hotels or schools. She also carried out legislative reform in Lucca, producing laws inspired by the Code Napoleon (such as the notable "Codice rurale del Principato di Piombino", issued on 24 March 1808) and producing a new penal code which was promulgated in 1807 and first reformed in 1810.

In 1807 she set up the Committee of Public Charity for distributing charity funds, made up of clergy and lay-people, and also instituted free medical consultations for the poor so as to eradicate the diseases then ravaging Lucca's population. She demolished Piombino's hospital to build a new one in the former monastery of Sant' Anastasia, with the new building opening in 1810, and also set up the Casa Sanitaria, a dispensary in the town's port. On 5 May 1807, decreed the established of the "Committee for the Encouragement of Agriculture, Arts and Commerce" to encourage and finance the invention of new machines and new techniques to increase the territories' agricultural production and experimental plantations such as those of mulberries at Massa, where an École Normale de la Soie (Silk School) was created on 16 August 1808.

Élisa also set up many teaching establishments in Lucca and, in 1809, a "Direction Générale de l'Instruction Publique" (General Department of Public Education). On 1 December 1807 she set up the "Collège Félix", the only boys' secondary school in the principality. For girls, she began by fixing set curricula for convents that also operated as schools, then set up a body of "dames d'inspection" to verify that these curricula were being adhered to. Teaching of girls aged 5 to 8 was made compulsory, though the laws were not always well applied. On 2 July 1807, Élisa founded the "Institut Élisa" within the limits of a former convent for noble-born girls, to produce well-educated and cultivated future wives. On 29 July 1812, Élisa set up an establishment for young poor girls, the "Congregazione San Felice", though this did not long outlive Élisa's fall.

As with Napoleon, Élisa set up city improvement works in her territories, mainly to expand the princely palaces. These works were hotly contested, especially in Lucca, where the expansion of the princely palaces necessitated the demolition of the Church of San Pietro in March 1807. She also razed an entire block in Lucca to build a piazza in the French style in front of her city residence (now the seat of the province and the prefecture). That block had included the Church of San Paolo with the venerated image of the Madonna dei miracoli and so its demolition seriously affected the city's medieval architecture and almost sparked a revolt.

At Massa, she demolished a cathedral on 30 April 1807. The palace at Lucca was fully redecorated and the gardens improved, with the creation of a botanical garden with a menagerie and aviary in 1811. She also began road construction, notably the "route Friedland" to link Massa and Carrara, with work beginning on 15 August 1807 but becoming delayed and only completed in 1820. Lucca's status as a spa town was also bolstered by her improvement of the architecture and decor of the town's baths. She began construction of an aqueduct into Lucca in 1811, but this too was only completed after her fall.

== Grand Duchess of Tuscany ==
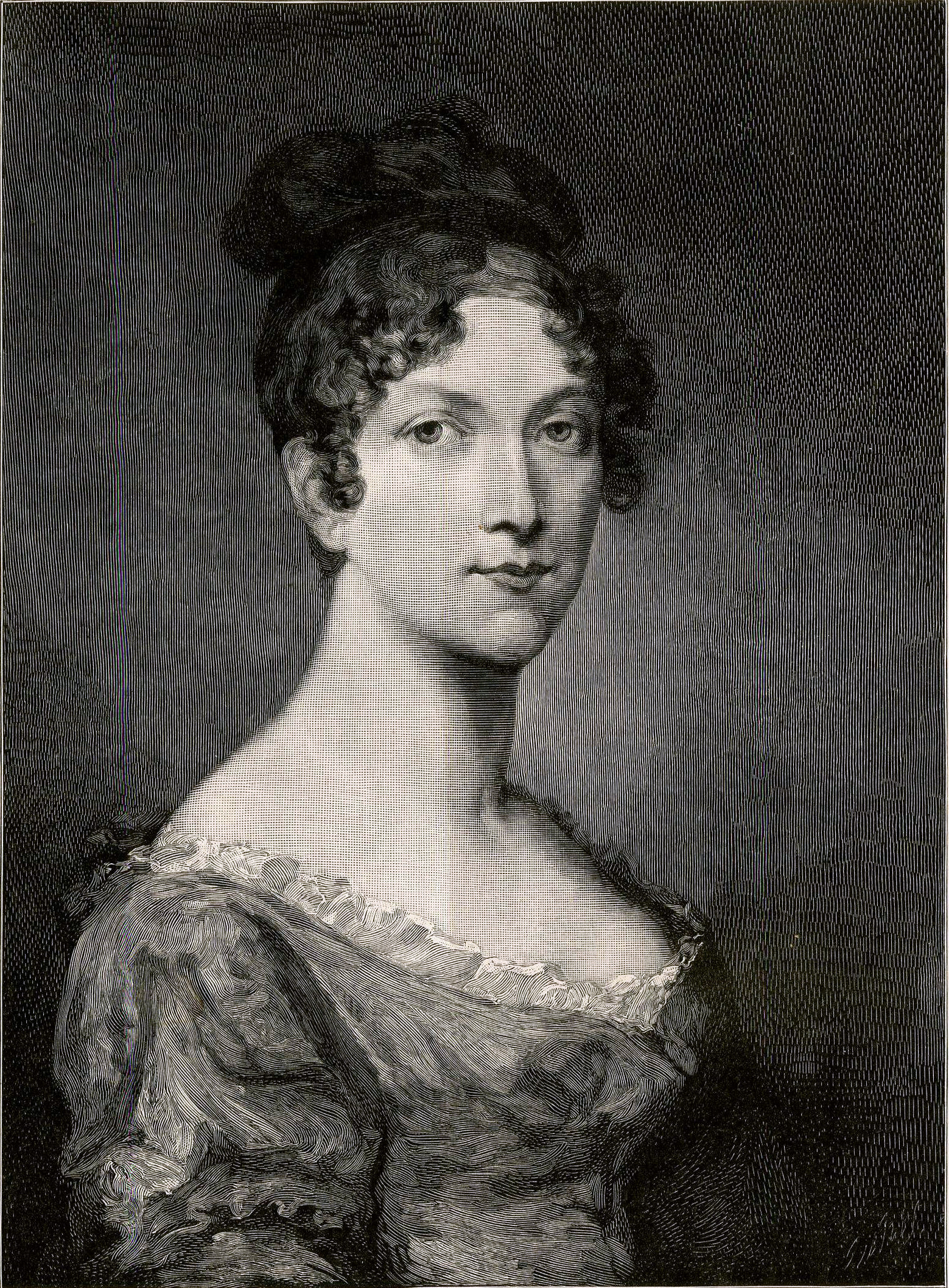
Elisa, as Grand Duchess of Tuscany, supported Napoleon's desire to unify Italy under Bonapartist rule.

In 1801, Napoleon created the Kingdom of Etruria out of Tuscany, under the infante Maria Louisa and her husband, Louis of Etruria, but he died in 1803. In 1807, he annexed Tuscany to France, and appointed General Menou as governor, but dismissed him in 1809.

Élisa had wished to become Governess of Tuscany in 1808, but she became ill late in the year and could not take part in state affairs. She recovered in February 1809. On 3 March 1809, Napoleon established the Grand Duchy of Tuscany, with Florence its capital and Élisa its "grand duchess". However, the terms of his decree required Élisa to enforce the decisions of Napoleon and his ministers and denied her the power to modify any of these decisions. This was a significant difference from the relative autonomy Élisa enjoyed in Lucca and Piombino. The decree also promoted her husband Félix to the rank of général de division.

Elisa was the only woman Napoleon entrusted with a real political responsibility. He normally disliked politically active women, and while he did appoint his second wife regent during his absence, that post was nominal only. Elisa was thus an exceptional case for Napoleon in this issue. He was later to say about her

"My sister, Elisa, has a masculine mind, a forceful character, noble qualities and outstanding intelligence; she will endure adversity with fortitude."

On 2 April 1809, Élisa arrived in Florence, where she was coldly received by the nobility. Her arrival coincided with a revolt against compulsory conscription that ended after a mayor and a judge were assassinated. The conscription and many new taxes imposed on Tuscany by Napoleon were sources of conflicts in the region. As at Lucca, Élisa tried to nationalise the goods of the clergy and closed many convents.

She continued her patronage of arts and science. In 1809, she commissioned the sculptor Lorenzo Bartolini to create busts of her immediate family. The first two volumes of the Annali del Museo Imperiale di Fisica e Storia Naturale of Florence were dedicated to her, in 1808 and 1809. The observatory at the museum was the ancestor of Florence's present-day Osservatorio Astrofisico di Arcetri.

Élisa later became unwillingly involved in Napoleon's removal of Pope Pius VII. Pius opposed the Empire's annexation of the Papal States, and excommunicated Napoleon in the bull Quum memoranda on 10 June 1809. Napoleon had Pius removed from Rome on 6 July, and sent to Savona. The pope passed by Florence, but Élisa did not meet him in person and asked him to leave the region as soon as possible, so as not to be seen as welcoming brother's enemy.

Élisa's relations with Napoleon became increasingly strained. Napoleon frequently recalled Élisa for any irregularity in her execution of his orders in Tuscany. On 17 March 1810, Élisa arrived in Paris for Napoleon's marriage to Marie-Louise of Austria, but Napoleon took advantage of her visit to reclaim the payments from his grants of Massa and Carrara. When Élisa returned to Tuscany, she found Napoleon still sought to claim payment of these grants via his envoys. Élisa refused to pay a second time, arguing that the territories had too few resources to pay Napoleon's demanded 200,000 lira. Napoleon threatened to seize Carrara from Élisa and also demanded Lucca raise men by conscription. Lucca was previously spared this burden prior to May 1811, and Napoleon's demands eroded Élisa support in Lucca. Élisa returned to Lucca from Florence and restored the villa now known as the Villa Reale di Marlia, despite the cold reception of the local community.

== Fall and exile ==
In 1813, with Napoleon facing the allied coalition after his Russian campaign, Caroline Bonaparte's husband Joachim Murat, King of Naples, abandoned his brother-in-law and joined the Austrian cause by leading the Neapolitan army to Rome, reaching Florence in January 1814. Élisa was forced to leave Tuscany (department) for Lucca (principality). The Neapolitans captured Massa and Carrara in March. An Anglo-Austrian force under Lord William Bentinck captured Lucca soon after, forcing the pregnant Élisa to flee on the night of 13 March 1814. Élisa was forced to abdicate as Grand Duchess of Tuscany in favor of Grand Duke Ferdinand III's restoration. Élisa made several short stays in Italy and France, notably seeking support in Marseille to return to Italy as a private individual. The former duchess' requests were denied, but she was able to stay in Austria for a time thanks to the efforts of her brother, Jérôme Bonaparte, before moving to the Villa Caprara in Trieste.

Napoleon was exiled to Elba on 13 April 1814 under the Treaty of Fontainebleau, and Élisa was arrested on 25 March and interned in the Austrian fortress of Brünn. She was freed at the end of August and authorized to stay in Trieste with the title of "Countess of Compignano". Élisa acquired a country house at Villa Vicentina near Cervignano after her release and financed several archaeological digs in the region. She contracted a fatal illness in June 1820, probably at an excavation site, and died on 7 August at the age of 43. Élisa became the only adult sibling of Napoleon Bonaparte not to survive the emperor. She was buried in the San Petronio Basilica of Bologna.

== Marriage and issue ==
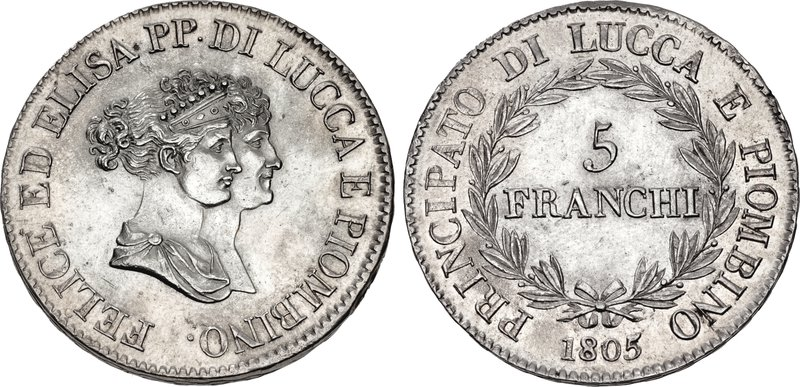
Lucchese coin (1805) with jugate busts of Elisa and Felice

She married Felice Pasquale Baciocchi, a member of Corsican nobility, on 1 May 1797, created Prince Français, Duke of Lucca and Prince of Piombino and Prince of Massa-Carrara and La Garfagnana. They were parents of five children:

- Felix Napoléon Baciocchi (1798–1799).
- Napoléon Baciocchi (1803–1803).
- Elisa Napoléone Baciocchi (1806–1869); married Philippe, Comte Camerata-Passioneï de Mazzoleni (1805–1882), and had one son:
  - Charles Félix Jean-Baptiste Camerata-Passionei di Mazzoleni (1826–1853)
- Jérôme Charles Baciocchi (1810–1811).
- Frédéric Napoléon Baciocchi (1813–1833).
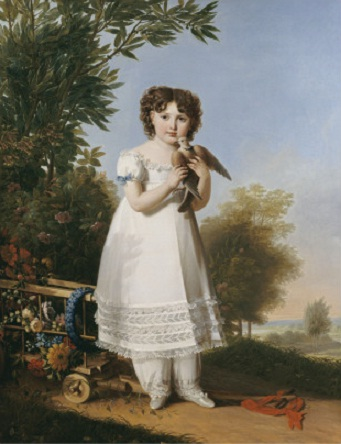
Elisa Napoléone by Marie-Guillemine Benoist, 1810

Portrait with her daughter Elisa by François Gérard, 1811

== Bibliography ==
- (in French) Florence Vidal, Élisa Bonaparte, éd. Pygmalion, 2005. 310 p. (ISBN 2857049692)
- (in French) Emmanuel de Beaufond, Élisa Bonaparte, princesse de Lucques et de Piombino, Paris : L'Univers (brochure hors-série du quotidien catholique), 1895. 32 p.
- (in French) Paul Marmottan, Élisa Bonaparte, Paris : H. Champion, 1898. 317 p.
- (in French) Jean d'Hertault, comte de Beaufort (under the pseudonym Jean de Beaufort), Élisa Bonaparte, princesse de Lucques et Piombino, grande-duchesse de Toscane (1777–1820), 1904 (brochure de 16 pages)
- (in French) Sforza, Giovanni, I figli di Elisa Baciocchi, in Ricordi e biografie lucchesi, Lucca, tip.ed. Baroni 1916 [ma 1918]. pp. 269–293

Elisa Bonaparte House of Bonaparte Born: 13 January 1777 Died: 7 August 1820
Regnal titles
| Vacant Kingdom of Etruria Title last held by King Louis II | Grand Duchess of Tuscany; 1809–1814 | Succeeded by Ferdinand III |
| New title | Princess of Lucca; 1805–1814 | Succeeded by Maria Louisa of Spain as Duchess |
| Preceded by Antonio II Boncompagni Ludovisi | Princess of Piombino; 1805–1808 | Succeeded by Luigi I Boncompagni-Ludovisi (titular Prince) |
