= L'Aiglon =

Historical play by Edmond Rostand

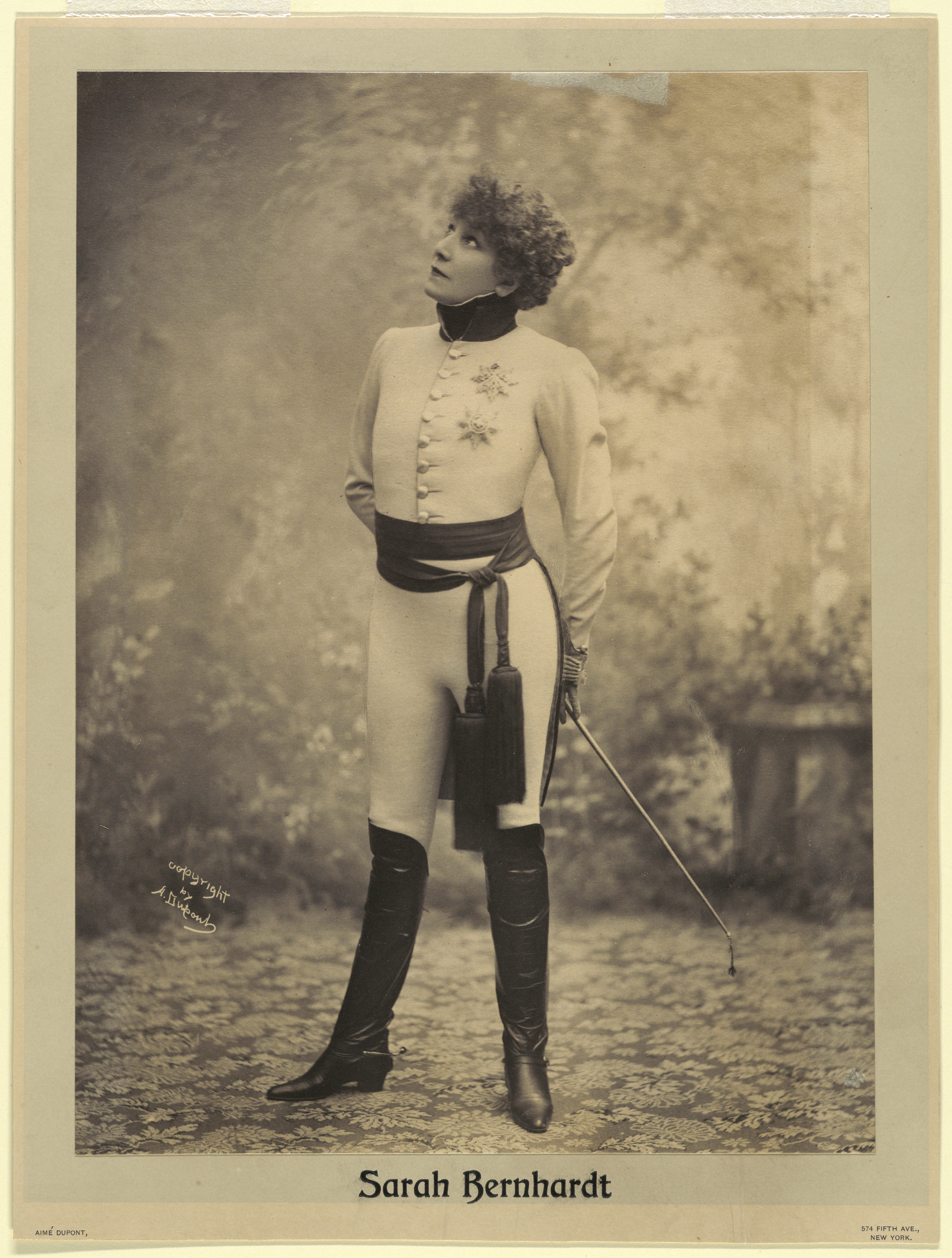
Sarah Bernhardt in the title role (1900)

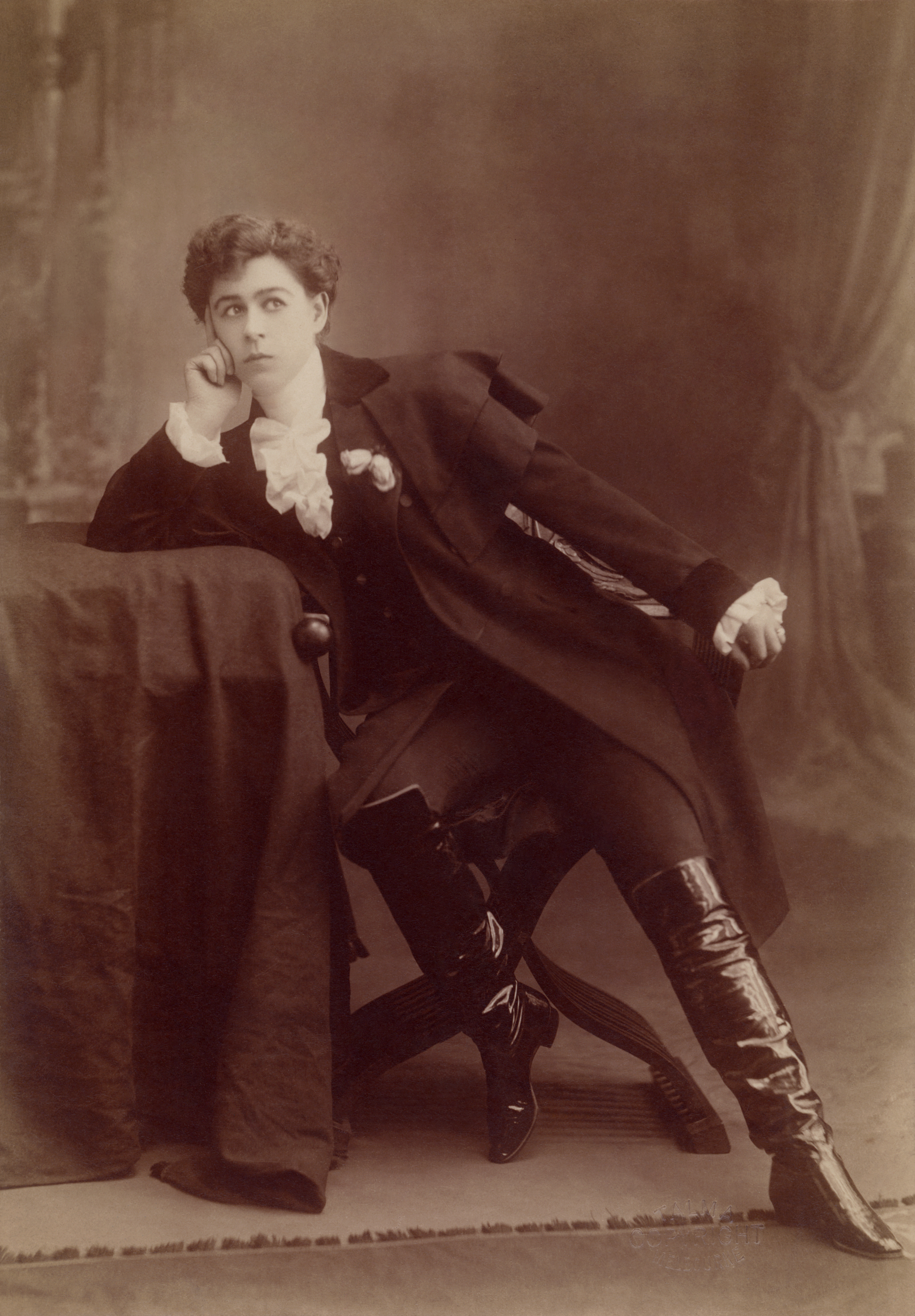
Minnie Tittell Brune in an Australian performance (1905)

L'Aiglon is a play in six acts by Edmond Rostand based on the life of Napoleon II, who was the son of Emperor Napoleon I and his second wife, Empress Marie Louise. The title of the play comes from a nickname for Napoleon II, the French word for "eaglet" (a young eagle).

Sarah Bernhardt portrayed the titular role in the play's premiere on 15 March 1900 at the Théàtre Sarah Bernhardt. Rostand had written L'Aiglon specifically for Bernhardt, and it became one of her signature roles.Fashion designer Jacques Doucet designed her famous white costume. In October of the same year, the play (in an English translation by Louis N. Parker) premiered at New York's Knickerbocker Theatre, with Maude Adams in the title role. Its first performance in London was at His Majesty's Theatre in 1901, with Bernhardt again playing the leading role.

Clemence Dane wrote an English translation which was broadcast by the BBC on National Radio on 15 November 1936 and regionally the following day. Marius Goring performed the leading role in this production.

Arthur Honegger and Jacques Ibert composed an opera in five acts, also with the title L'Aiglon, to a libretto by Henri Cain, based on Rostand's play. It was first performed at the Opéra de Monte-Carlo in 1937.

== Plot ==
Residing in Austria following his father's exile to St. Helena, Napoleon Franz, Duke of Reichstadt, is effectively a prisoner in the court of his grandfather, Emperor Franz I. He is closely guarded by Chancellor Metternich, who controls his life and is determined to stave off any Bonapartist aspirations. Invigorated by his father's heroic legacy, Franz yearns to make a return to France. To that end, he is loyally aided by supporters such as Séraphin Flambeau, a grenadier in the Grande Armée, and Franz's cousin Countess Camerata.

During a masquerade ball at Schönbrunn Palace, Franz and Flambeau manage to slip away while Camerata acts as a decoy. They journey to the historic battleground of Wagram, where Franz experiences visions of the conflict and of his father's triumphs. However, Franz's dreams of regaining his family's lost power are silenced as Metternich's police recapture him. Flambeau kills himself to evade capture, and Franz is forced back to Vienna. Disheartened and exhausted, Franz's declining health from tuberculosis overtakes him, dying aged twenty-one without fulfilling his ambitions. Metternich orders that Franz be buried in his Austrian military uniform, depriving the young man of his identity as Napoleon's son in death.
