= Felice Pasquale Baciocchi =

French soldier (1762-1841), married into the Imperial family

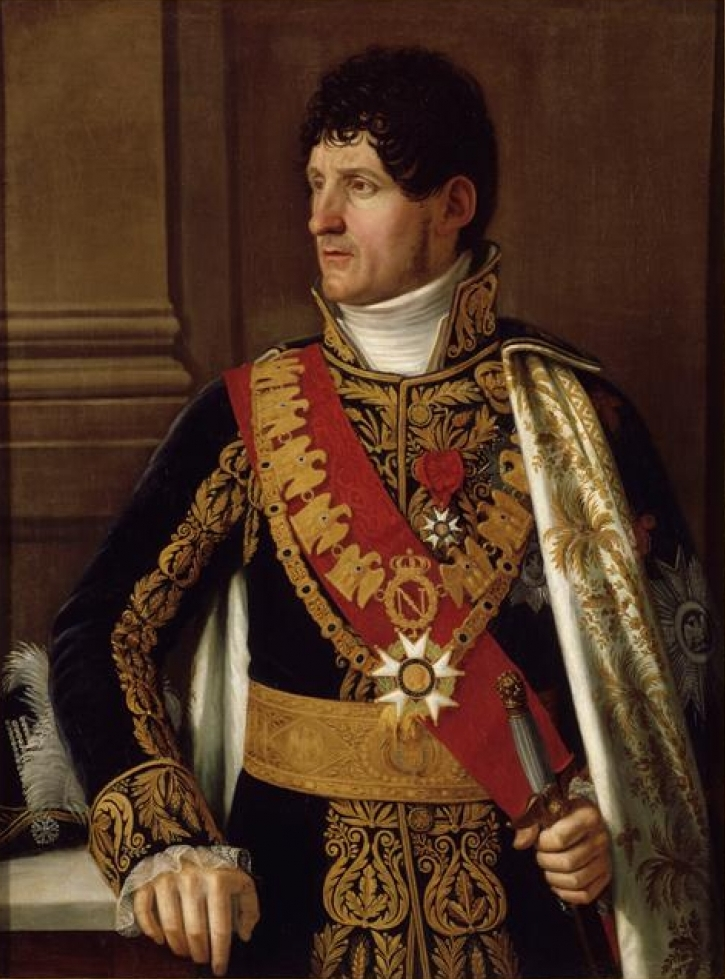
- Portrait by Pietro Benvenuti

Prince of Lucca and Piombino
- Reign: 19 March 1805 – 18 March 1814
- Predecessor: Antonio II Boncompagni Ludovisi (as Prince of Piombino)
- Successor: Maria Luisa (as Duchess of Lucca); Luigi I Boncompagni-Ludovisi (as Prince of Piombino)
- Co-ruler: Elisa Bonaparte

Consort of the Tuscan ruler
- Tenure: 3 March 1809 – 1 February 1814
- Born: 18 May 1762; Ajaccio, Corsica
- Died: 27 April 1841 (aged 78); Bologna
- Spouse: Elisa Bonaparte (m. 1797; died 1820)
- Issue: Felix Napoléon Baciocchi; Napoléon Baciocchi; Elisa Napoléone Baciocchi; Jérôme Charles Baciocchi; Frédéric Napoléon Baciocchi
- Family: Baciocchi
- Military career
- Allegiance: French First Republic; First French Empire
- Branch: French Army
- Rank: Général de division

Felice Pasquale Baciocchi (18 May 1762 – 27 April 1841) was a French major general. He married Elisa Bonaparte, a sister of Napoleon, and was Prince of Lucca and Piombino by rule of jure uxoris.

== Biography ==
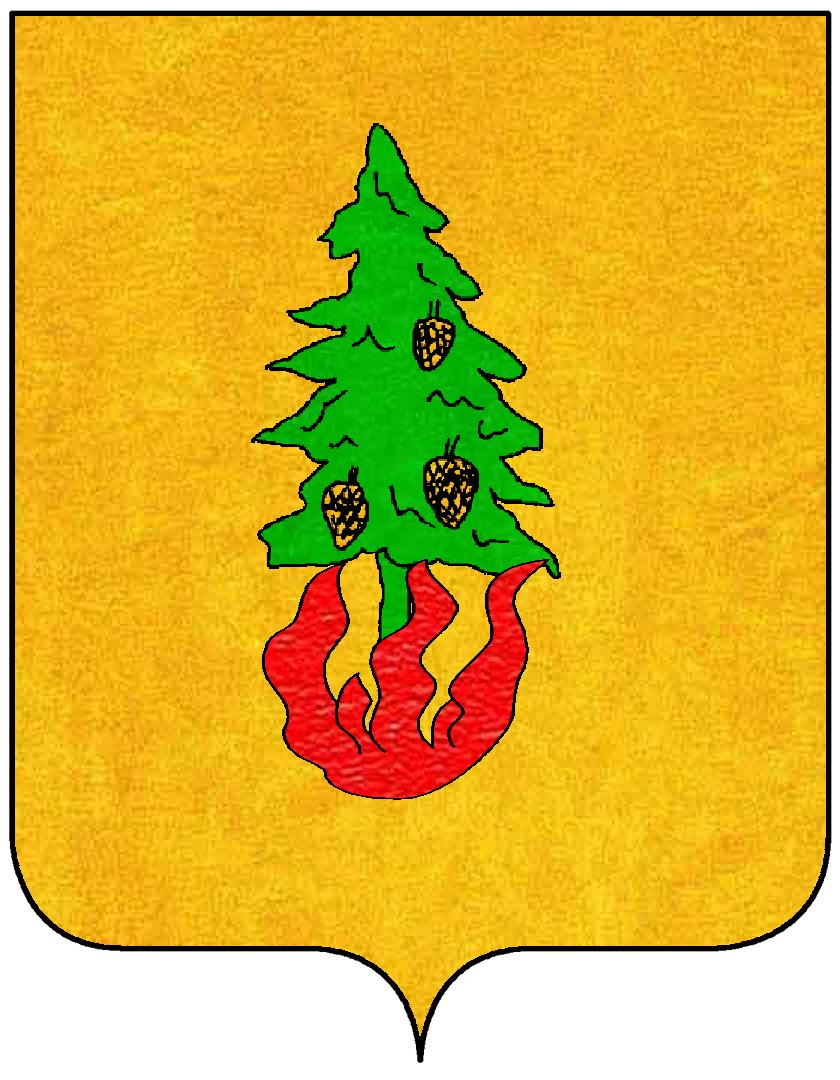
Arms of the Baciocchi family

As the son of Francis, he was born in Ajaccio into a noble, but poor, French Corsican family. He was second lieutenant in the French army in 1778, lieutenant in 1788, then captain in 1794. Around 5 May 1797, he married Elisa Maria Bonaparte, Napoleon's younger sister, in Marseille.

Baciocchi was appointed secretary to the ambassador to the Spanish Royal Court in November 1800 and moved to Madrid, while his wife remained in France.

Baciocchi was then promoted to army colonel in 1802, to brigadier general in 1804, and to major general in 1809. He was also made a senator in 1804 and imperial prince in 1805.

Thanks to his brother-in-law's conquests, Baciocchi became Prince of Lucca, but without the associated power or the sovereign power, which really was exercised by his wife.

Baciocchi was an avid amateur violinist, and he studied with violin virtuoso Niccolò Paganini for ten years while residing in Lucca and Florence. During this time, his wife and Paganini were also carrying on a romantic affair.

He was made governor of Poscane in 1809.

He put up with his wife's infidelities with equanimity and was content with a role oscillating between that of an aide-de-camp and a prince consort.

When Napoleon's empire collapsed, he retired with Elisa to Trieste, then to Bologna after her death in 1820. He died in that city on 27 April 1841.

== Family ==
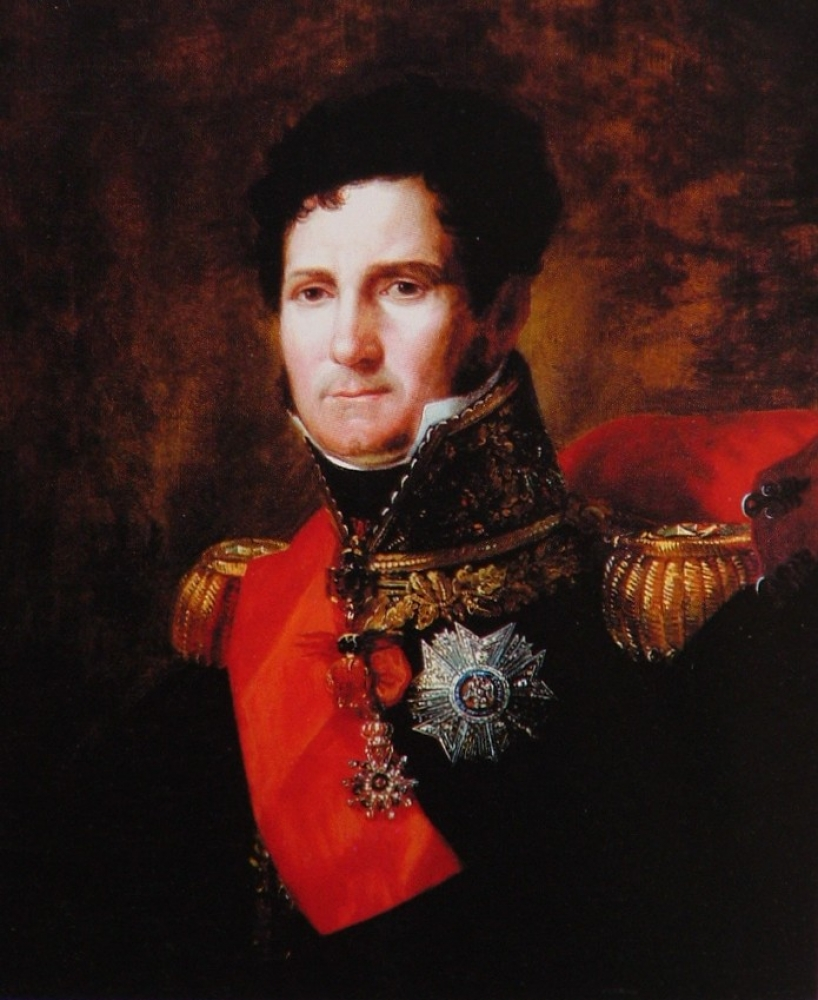
Portrait circa 1805

Baciocchi and Bonaparte had five children, but only two of them reached the adulthood:

- Felix Napoléon Baciocchi (1798–1799).
- Napoléon Baciocchi (1803–1803).
- Elisa Napoléone Baciocchi (1806–1869); married Philippe, Comte Camerata-Passionei de Mazzoleni (1805–1882), and had one son:
  - Charles Félix Jean-Baptiste Camerata-Passionei di Mazzoleni (1826–1853)
- Jérôme Charles Baciocchi (1810–1811).
- Frédéric Napoléon Baciocchi (1813–1833).

== Awards ==
Grand Eagle of the legion of honour, 6th of March 1805.
