= Portrait of Madeleine =

Painting by Marie-Guillemine Benoist

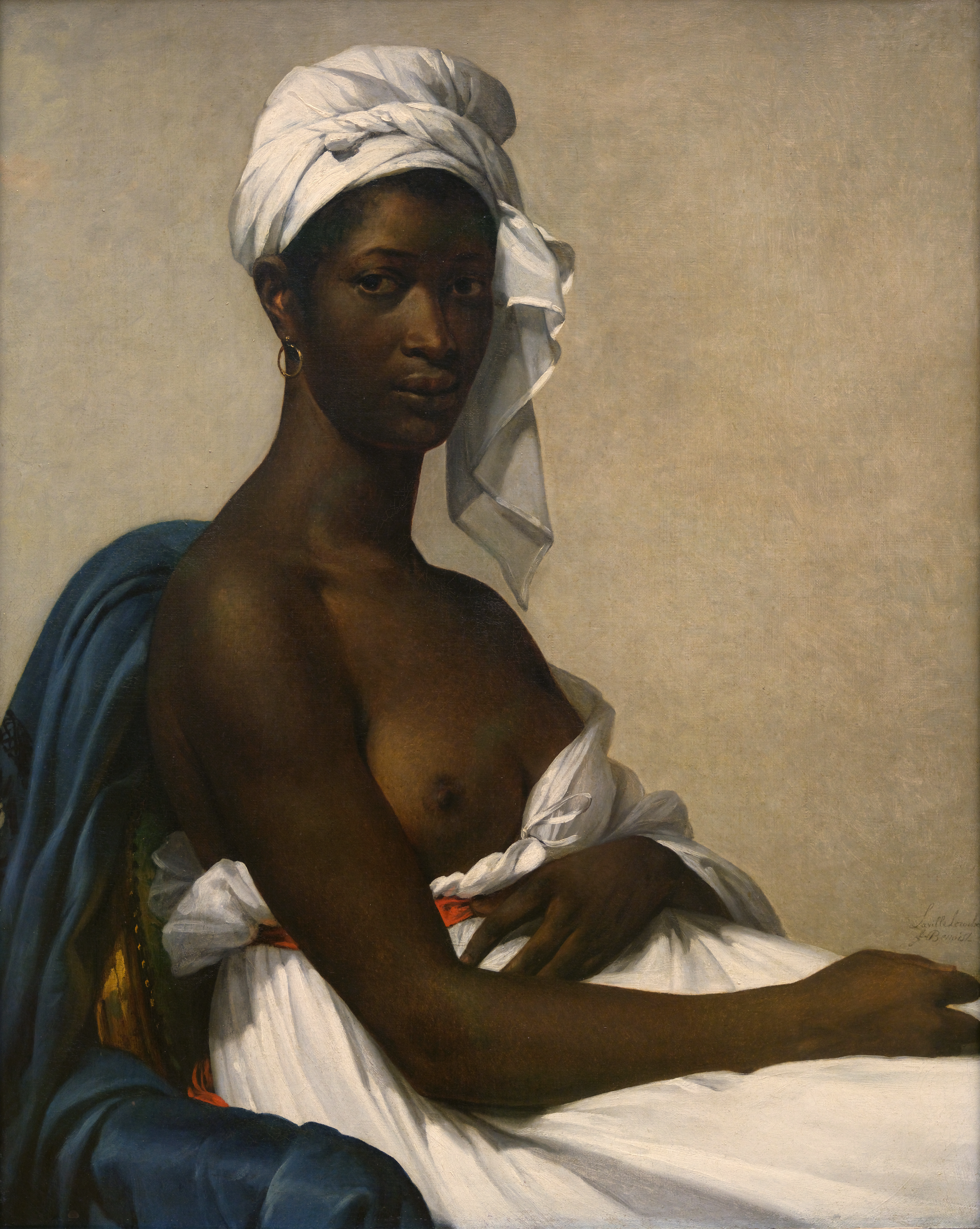
- Artist: Marie-Guillemine Benoist
- Year: 1800
- Medium: Oil on canvas
- Dimensions: 81 cm × 65 cm (32 in × 26 in)
- Location: Louvre, Paris

Portrait of Madeleine, also known as Portrait of a Black Woman (French: Portrait d'une femme noire or Portrait d'une negresse), is an oil-on-canvas painting by the French artist Marie-Guillemine Benoist, created in 1800. It was exhibited at the Paris Salon of 1800, later was acquired by Louis XVIII for the French state in 1818, and remains in the collection of the Louvre.

== Background ==
The painting was created between the first abolition of slavery by the French revolutionary government in 1794 and its reinstatement in 1802 under Napoleon. The painting was initially exhibited at the 1800 Salon amid wider anxieties about slavery and race within France and its Caribbean colonies.

At the Salon, the painting was simply listed as ''Portrait d’une négresse'', replacing the sitter’s personal name with a racialized label.

== Description ==
The half-length portrait measures 81 cm × 65 cm (32 in × 26 in). It depicts a young Black woman, sitting in a gilt armchair mostly covered with a blue cloth, in front of a plain light background. She is seated in a three-quarter position towards her left, but her head turns to look directly at the viewer with an unsmiling and composed expression. She is wearing a white cloth tied as a headdress, and a white dress tied with a red cord. The loose end of the headcloth hangs down on the left side of her face, but her right ear is visible with a hoop earring. Her right arm rests in her lap; her left arm is holding up the dress, but it has slipped down to reveal her right breast. Her legs fall outside the frame. Art historian Viktoria Schmidt-Linsenhoff notes the soft brown and golden highlights across the sitter's face and body and subtle gradations between light and shadow.

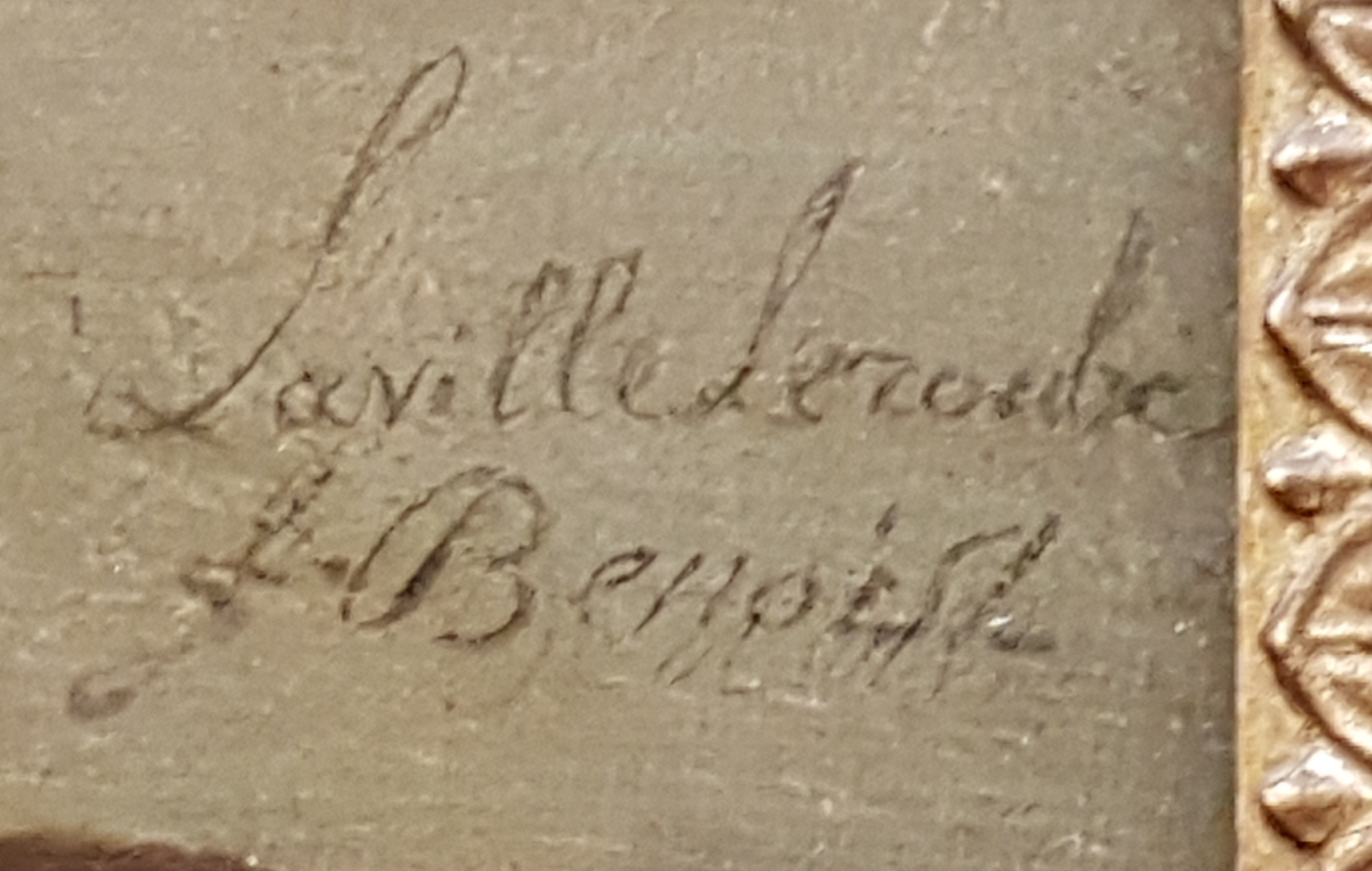
Benoist's signature

It is signed near the subject's right hand with the artist's maiden name and married names: "Laville Leroulx / f. Benoist" ("f" for "femme", or "wife of").

The composition has similarities to Benoist's 1802 portrait of Madame Philippe Panon Desbassayns de Richemont and her son Eugène, now held by the Metropolitan Museum of Art.

== Exhibition ==
The painting was first exhibited at the 1800 Paris Salon as Portrait d'une négresse. Along with three other works by Benoist, the painting was acquired by Louis XVIII for France in 1818 for a total price of 11,000 francs. Initially held at the Luxembourg Palace, it has been in the collection at the Louvre for many years.

The painting was renamed Portrait de Madeleine after recent scholarship led to the identification of the subject in 2019 as a woman named Madeleine who came to France from Guadeloupe after slavery was abolished in France and its colonies in 1794, and who worked as a servant for Benoist's in-laws, the Benoist-Cavays.

== Interpretation ==
The subject – a woman of colour – was unusual at the time: the only other portrait of a person of colour at the Paris Salon in this period was Anne-Louis Girodet de Roussy-Trioson's 1797 portrait of Jean-Baptiste Belley.

Its enigmatic presentation and apparent internal contradictions have prompted much speculation about the artist's motivation and intentions, with recent interpretations focussing on ideas of slavery, race, gender, class, and their interactions.

Scholars have speculated about the sitter's identity, suggesting that she may have been a woman brought from Guadeloupe by Benoist's brother-in-law and employed as a servant in the artist's extended household. Despite this, Madeleine is depicted with fine accessories, wearing jewelry and sitting on an expensive chair. Most paintings of the period that include Black women show them as servants to a white woman; while Madeleine sits alone, she is working as a model to the unseen Benoist. The simple white clothes have a neoclassical air, similar to other contemporary portraits such as Jacques-Louis David’s 1799 portrait of Henriette de Verninac. The bared breast would be unusual for a portrait painting, and suggests an allegory or mythological subject, or possibly alludes to the slave trade. Art historian James Smalls argues that Benoist utilizes neoclassical style and erotic elements to engage a predominantly male Salon audience, at a time when key artistic and political figures were mostly men. Similarly, Helen Weston suggests that Benoist strategically combined elements of portraiture and depictions of female nudes, such as bare breasts, to advertise her skills while keeping the sitter socially “typed." The colours – red, white, blue – parallel the colours of the French revolutionary tricolour adopted in 1789, and may suggest an allusion to Marianne, a female personification of liberty and of France itself.

Painted in the brief period between the abolition of slavery in 1794 and the reinstatement of slavery in French colonies by Napoleon in 1802, the work has been taken as a symbol of women's emancipation and Black people's rights. Some art historians, such as Viktoria Schmidt-Linsenhoff, argue that this interpretation of the painting as emancipatory is inconsistent with its original title, which referred to the sitter as “négresse.”

Art historians have also explored the tension surrounding the painting’s format as an elite portrait and the fact that the sitter’s biography remains largely unknown. Schmidt-Linsenhoff emphasizes that, although the portrait's original title was a generic racial description rather than a personal name, it follows the conventions of a high-status portrait and presents the sitter with individualized facial features and pose. She relates this contrast between an anonymous, racialized title and an individualized image to wider post-revolutionary debates about who could be recognized as a political subject.

Cécile Bishop examines the range of interpretations the painting has received. She notes that critics and scholars have alternately treated it as a sympathetic, elevating portrait or as exoticizing erotic imagery, and argues that it does not fit neatly into either category. Drawing on Édouard Glissant’s concept of opacity, Bishop suggests that the sitter's expression, the absence of her name from the original title, and Benoist's detailed rendering of skin and fabric complicate attempts to fully define or categorize the figure.

Art historian Oliver Wunsch situates Portrait of Madeleine within eighteenth-century French debates about the "aesthetic redemption" of Black bodies in art. Examining contemporary criticism, he notes that reviewers could describe Black women as "uniformly ugly" while praising Benoist's execution as "beautiful". Wunsch argues these comments encouraged viewers to separate appreciation of the painting from the perceived inferiority of its subject, as if technical skill could compensate for a subject regarded as socially inferior.

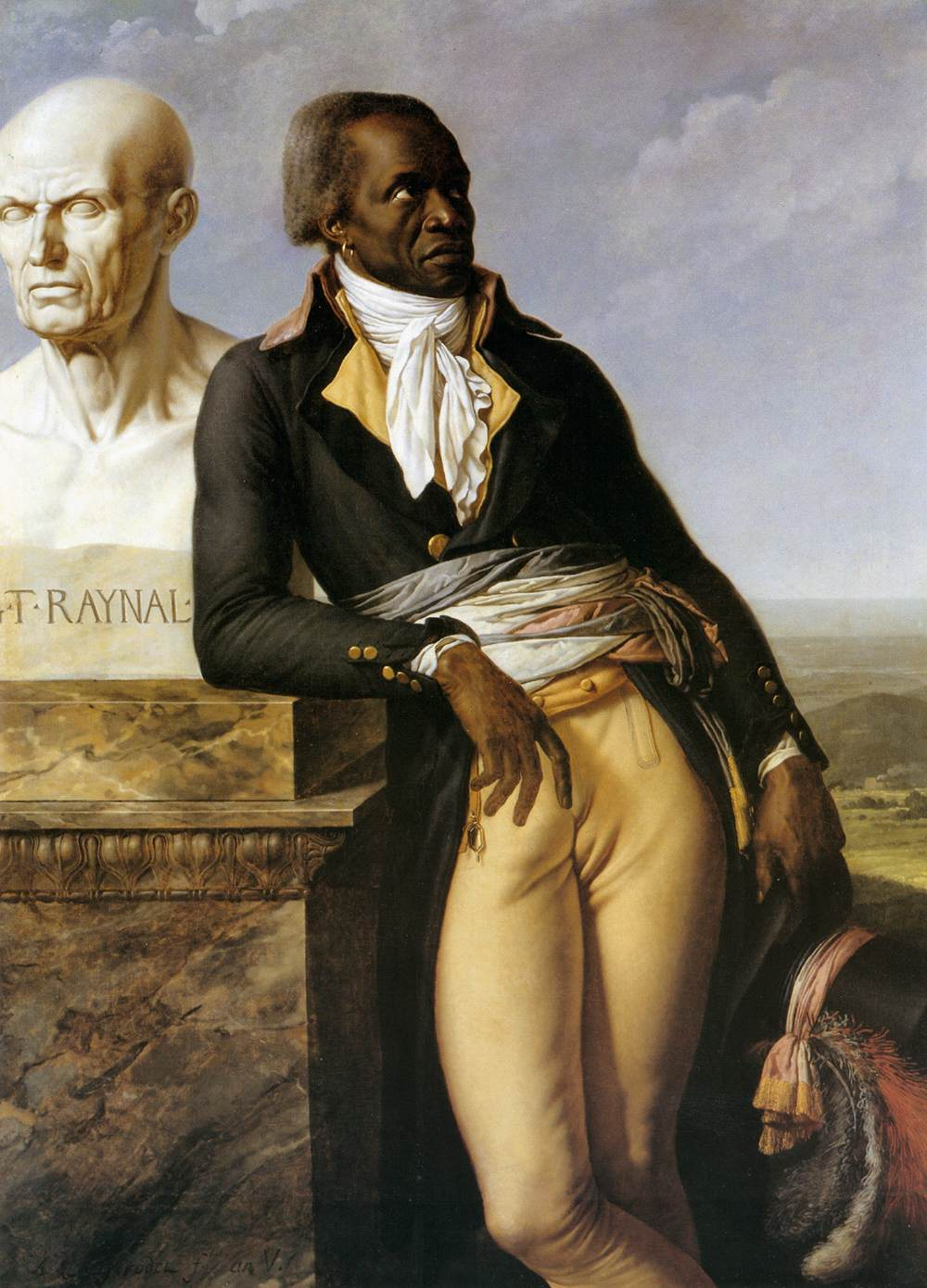
Anne-Louis Girodet de Roussy-Trioson, Portrait of Jean-Baptiste Belley, 1797, Palace of Versailles

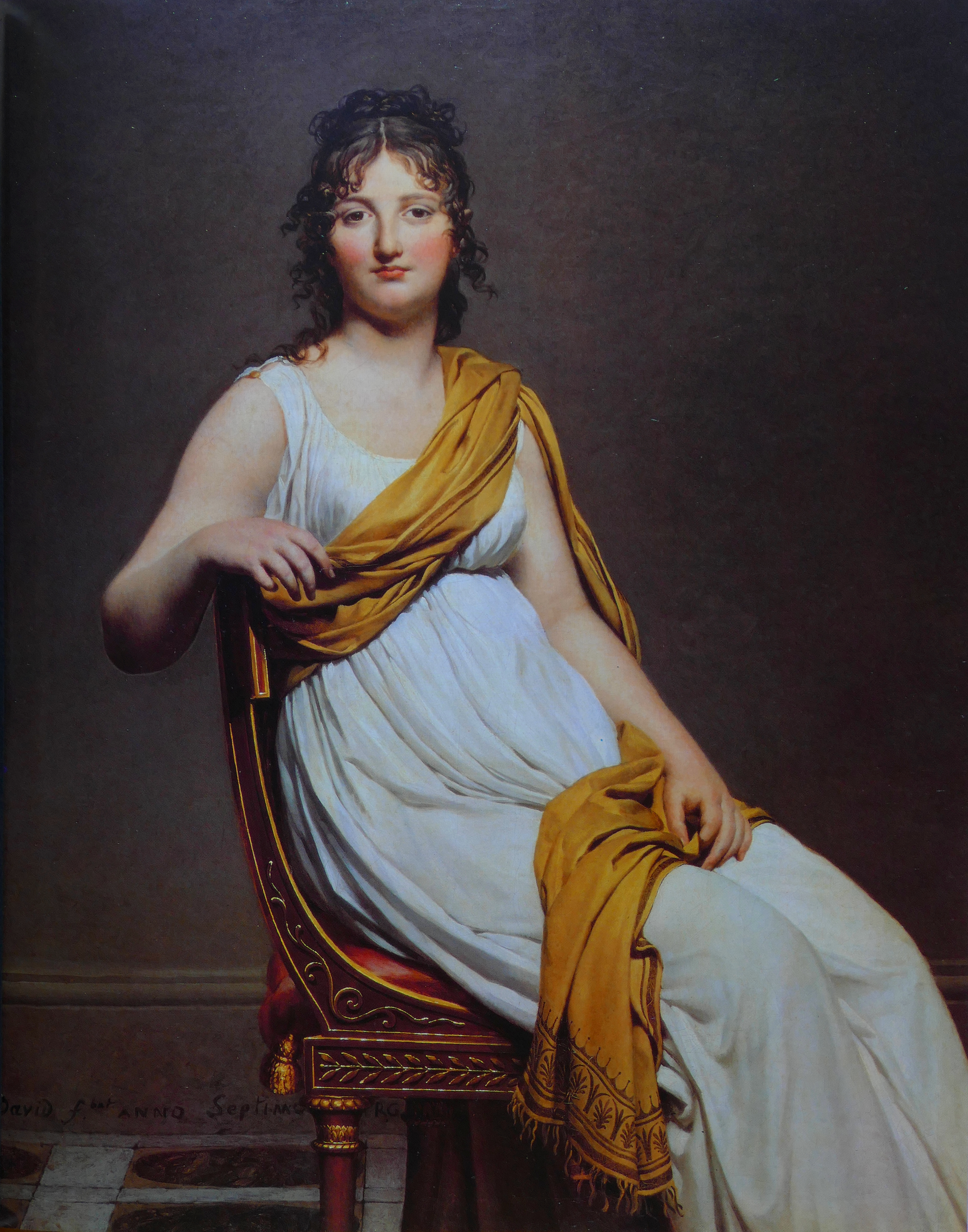
Jacques-Louis David, Portrait of Henriette de Verninac, 1799, Louvre

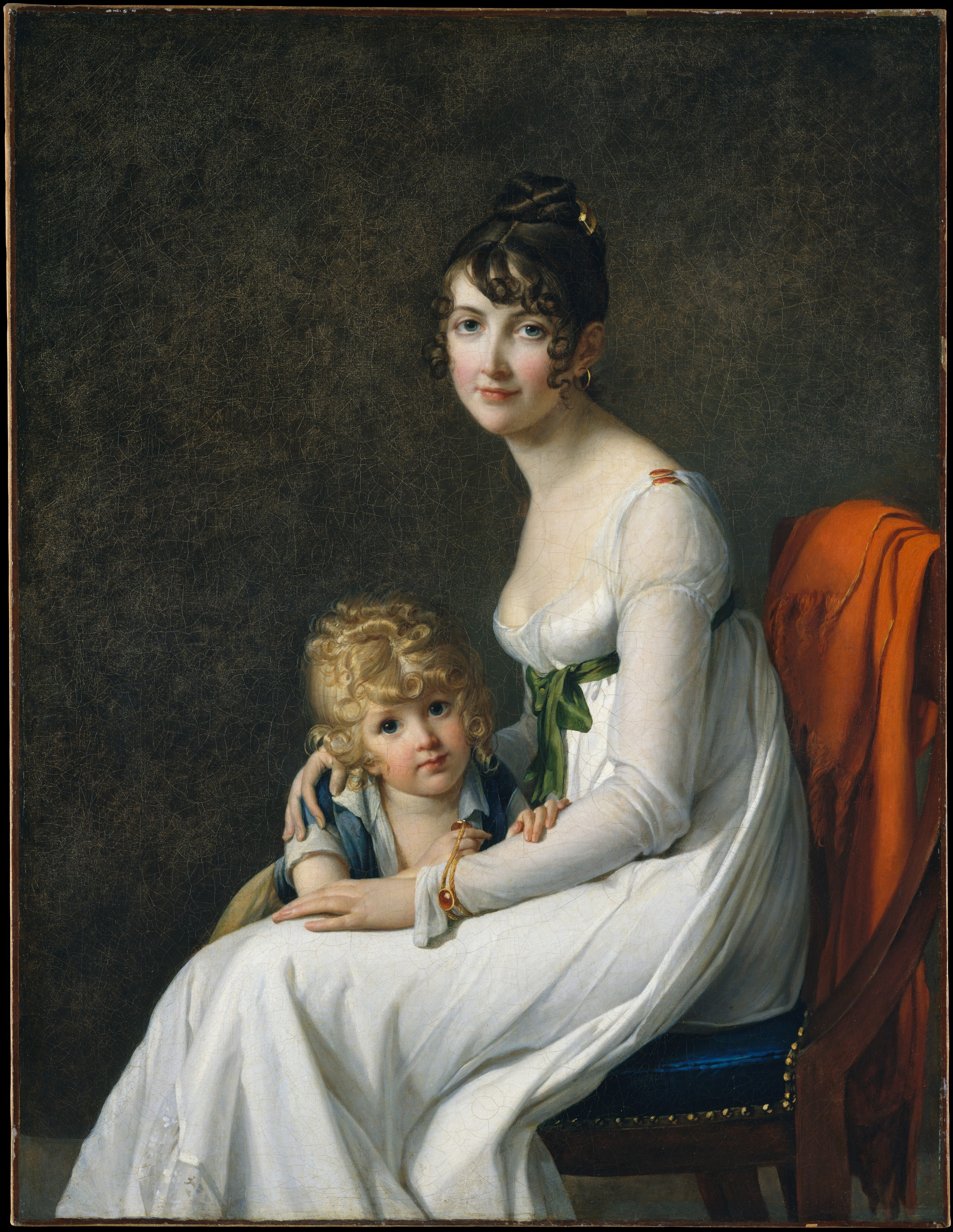
Benoist, portrait of Madame Philippe Panon Desbassayns de Richemont (Jeanne Eglé Mourgue) and Her Son Eugène, 1802, Metropolitan Museum of Art
