= Elisa Napoléone Baciocchi =

Italian noblewoman

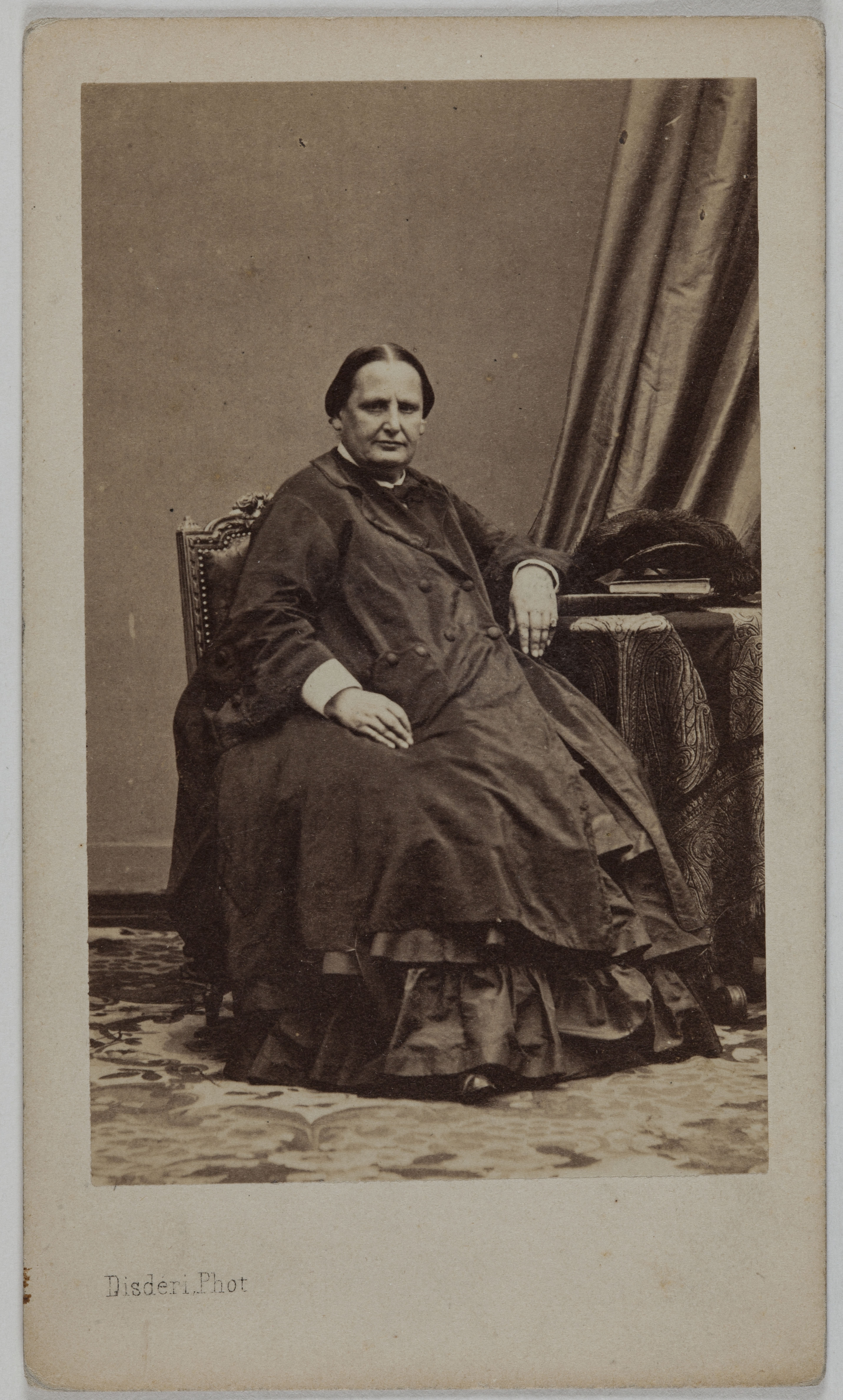
- Photo by André-Adolphe-Eugène Disdéri, 1870-1890
- Full name: Elisa Napoléone Baciocchi Levoy
- Born: 3 June 1806; Lucca, Principality of Lucca and Piombino
- Died: 3 February 1869 (aged 62); Korn-er-Hoüet, Colpo, Brittany, France
- Noble family: Baciocchi
- Spouse: Filippo Camerata-Passionei di Mazzoleni (m. 1824)
- Issue: Charles Félix Jean-Baptiste Camerata-Passionei di Mazzoleni
- Father: Felice Pasquale Baciocchi
- Mother: Elisa Bonaparte

Elisa Napoléone Baciocchi Levoy (3 June 1806 – 3 February 1869) was the daughter of Felice Baciocchi and Elisa Bonaparte, who was Princess of Lucca and Piombino and a sister of Napoleon I. She was their only child to live beyond their teenage years.

== Life ==
Princess Elisa Napoléone Baciocchi Levoy was born at Lucca in the Principality of Lucca and Piombino, where her mother was the ruling princess.

Violinist Niccolò Paganini often resided at Lucca at her court.

On 17 November 1824, she married Count Filippo Camerata-Passionei di Mazzoleni (1805–1882) in Florence. They had one son, Charles Félix Jean-Baptiste Camerata-Passionei di Mazzoleni, born in 1826. The couple separated shortly after their son's birth, and Elisa moved to Trieste, where she contacted other exiled members of the Bonaparte family to try to re-establish Napoleon's only son, Napoleon François, on the throne of France.

On Napoleon François's death in 1832, Elisa supported the rise of her cousin Louis-Napoleon and on his accession as emperor Napoleon III in 1852, she moved to Paris. There, she obtained the title of maîtres des requêtes au Conseil d'État for her son, but he could not withstand the pressure of court life, and died at the age of 26, under mysterious circumstances.

Deeply affected by her son's death, Elisa left the court and, after a brief stay in the Veneto, settled for good in Brittany, where she devoted herself to tilling her lands and creating a farm and several fisheries. She built the chateau of Korn-er-Hoüet at Colpo, where she died in 1869, aged 62.

== Gallery ==
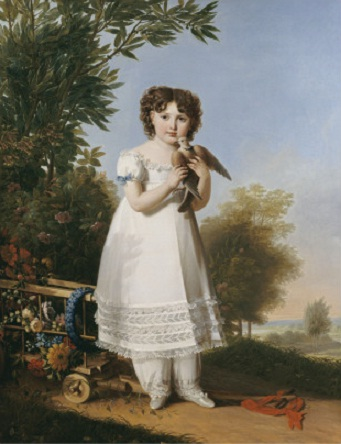
Portrait by Marie-Guillemine Benoist, 1810

Elisa and her mother by François Gérard, 1811

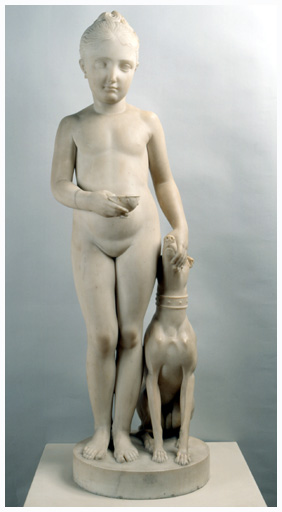
Élisa Napoléone Baciocchi et son chien, Lorenzo Bartolini, 1812

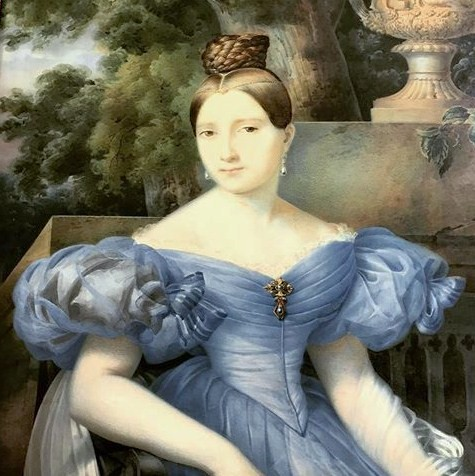
Portrait by Michel Ghislain Stapleaux, 1830s
