= Charles Félix Jean-Baptiste Camerata-Passionei di Mazzoleni =

French-Italian aristocrat (1826–1853)

Charles Félix Jean-Baptiste Camerata-Passionei di Mazzoleni (20 September 1826 – 4 March 1853) was a French-Italian aristocrat born in Ancona, the son of Filippo Camerata-Passionei di Mazzoleni, an Italian count, and Princess Elisa Napoléone Baciocchi, the daughter of Felice Baciocchi Levoy and Elisa Bonaparte. He was therefore a grandnephew of Napoleon and a first cousin once removed of Louis Napoléon Bonaparte, who became President of the French Republic in 1848 and then Emperor of the French as Napoléon III in 1852.

Camerata-Passionei di Mazzoleni was one of the maîtres des requêtes au Conseil d'État, but committed suicide at the age of twenty-six after being prevented from marrying an actress.

== Sources ==
- http://geneweb.inria.fr/roglo?lang=en;p=charles+felix+jean+baptiste;n=camerata+passionei+di+mazzoleni%5B‍%5D
