= Colpo =

Commune in Brittany, France

Colpo Kolpoù
- Commune
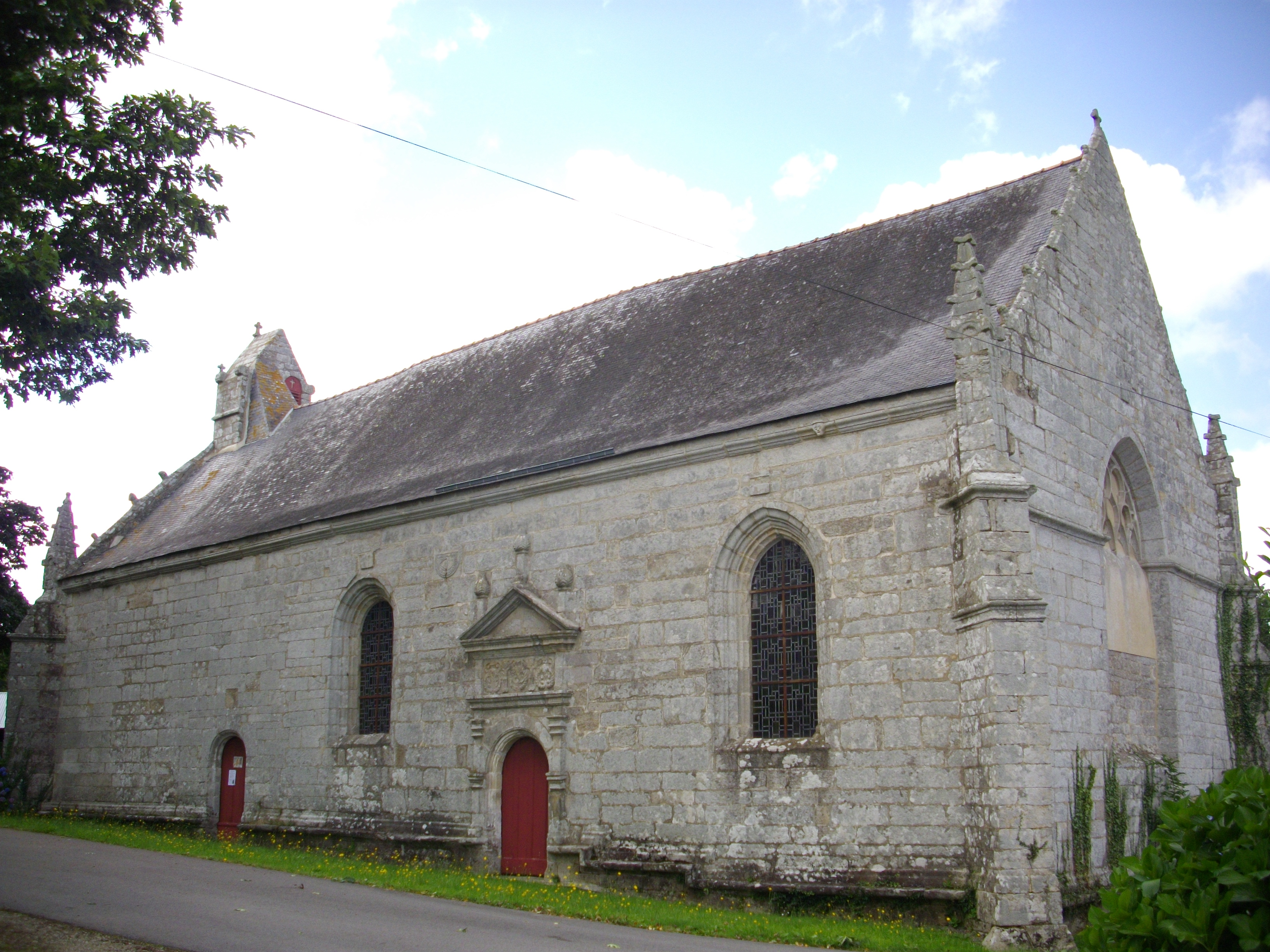
- The Chapelle Notre-Dame de Kerdroguen

- Coat of arms
- Location of Colpo
- Location within France Location within Brittany
- Coordinates: 47°49′12″N 2°48′32″W
- Country: France
- Region: Brittany
- Department: Morbihan
- Arrondissement: Vannes
- Canton: Grand-Champ
- Intercommunality: Golfe du Morbihan - Vannes Agglomération

Government
  - Mayor (2026–32): Freddy Jahier
- Area^{1}: 26.48 km^{2} (10.22 sq mi)
- Highest elevation: 156 m (512 ft)
- Lowest elevation: 52 m (171 ft)
- Population (2023): 2,296
  - Density: 86.71/km^{2} (224.6/sq mi)
- Time zone: UTC+01:00 (CET)
  - Summer (DST): UTC+02:00 (CEST)
- INSEE/Postal code: 56042 /56390
- ^{1} French Land Register data, which excludes lakes, ponds, glaciers > 1 km^{2} (0.386 sq mi or 247 acres) and river estuaries.

Colpo (French pronunciation: [kɔlpo]; Breton: Kolpoù) is a commune in the Morbihan department of the region of Brittany in north-western France.

== Demographics ==
Inhabitants of Colpo are called Colpéens in French.

Historical population

| Year | Pop. | ±% p.a. |
|---|---|---|
| 1866 | 973 | — |
| 1872 | 1,000 | +0.46% |
| 1876 | 1,286 | +6.49% |
| 1881 | 1,016 | −4.60% |
| 1886 | 1,106 | +1.71% |
| 1891 | 1,157 | +0.91% |
| 1896 | 1,161 | +0.07% |
| 1901 | 1,203 | +0.71% |
| 1906 | 1,232 | +0.48% |
| 1911 | 1,268 | +0.58% |
| 1921 | 1,234 | −0.27% |
| 1926 | 1,177 | −0.94% |
| 1931 | 1,246 | +1.15% |

| Year | Pop. | ±% p.a. |
|---|---|---|
| 1936 | 1,254 | +0.13% |
| 1946 | 1,308 | +0.42% |
| 1954 | 1,230 | −0.77% |
| 1962 | 1,222 | −0.08% |
| 1968 | 1,231 | +0.12% |
| 1975 | 1,158 | −0.87% |
| 1982 | 1,378 | +2.52% |
| 1990 | 1,659 | +2.35% |
| 1999 | 1,809 | +0.97% |
| 2007 | 2,189 | +2.41% |
| 2012 | 2,258 | +0.62% |
| 2017 | 2,222 | −0.32% |
| 2023 | 2,296 | +0.55% |

Source: EHESS and INSEE (1968-2023)

== Map ==
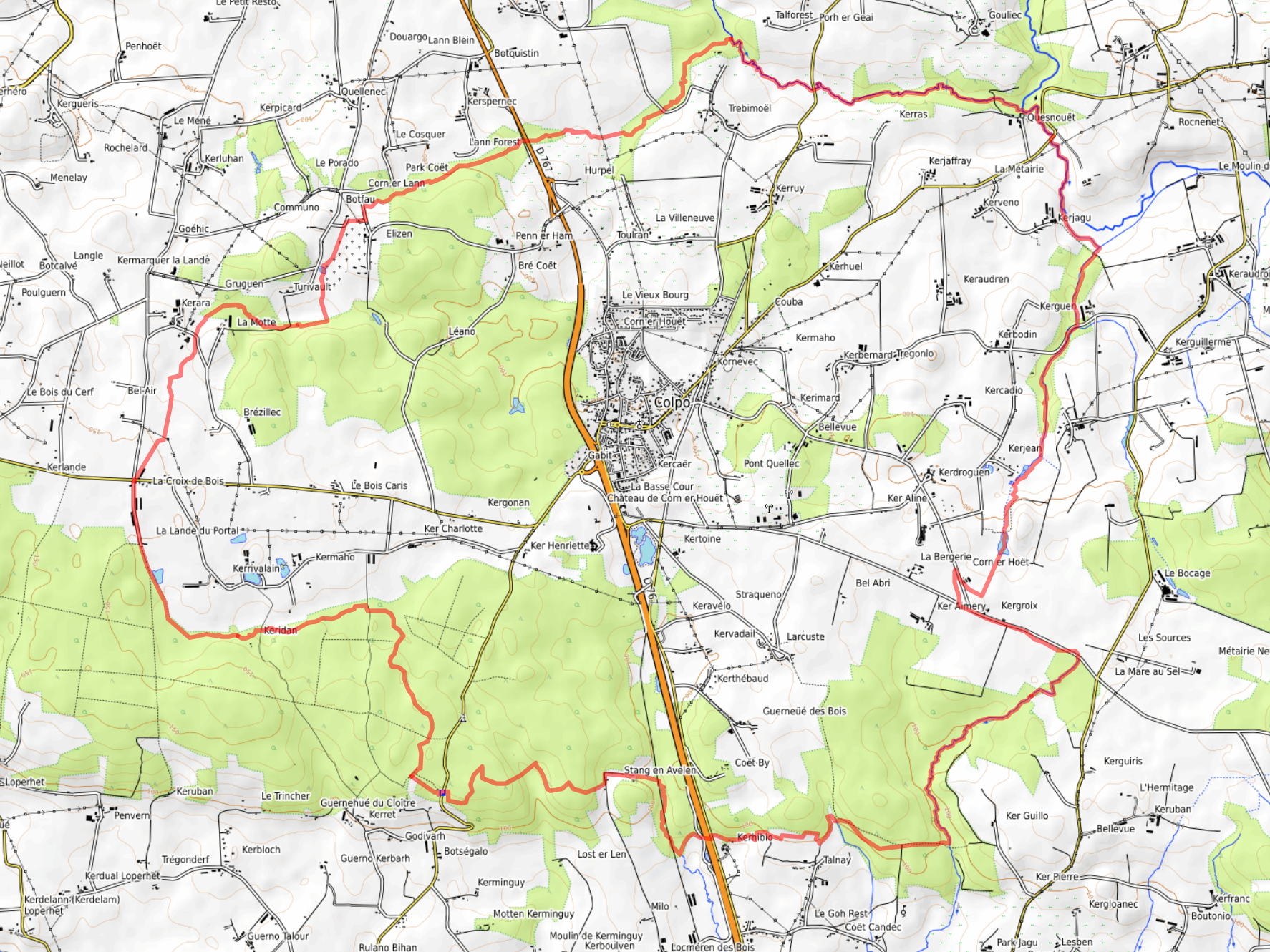
Topographic map

== See also ==
- Communes of the Morbihan department
