= Fanny Heldy =

Belgian lyric soprano opera singer

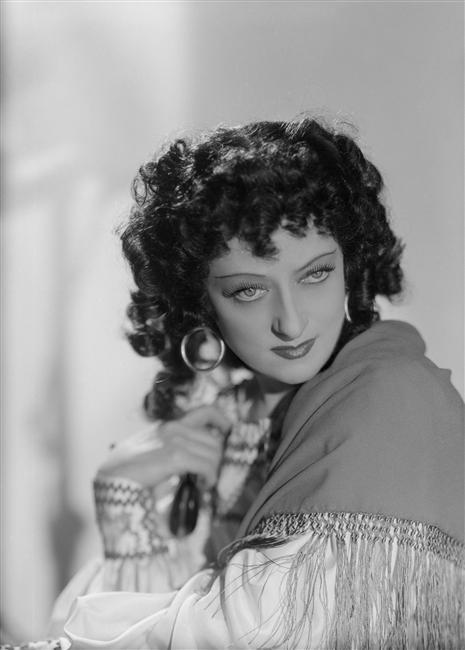
Fanny Heldy in 1939

Fanny Heldy (29 February 1888 – 13 December 1973) was a Belgian lyric soprano opera singer.

== Life ==
Born Marguerite Virginie Emma Clémentine Deceuninck in Ath (some sources say Liège), Hainaut Province, Belgium, she graduated from the Royal Conservatory of Liège. Heldy made her professional debut as a substitute in the premiere of Ivan the Terrible, by Raoul Gunsbourg (at La Monnaie, 26 November 1910). Between 1914 and 1918 she sang in a number of major roles at Opéra de Monte-Carlo, making her first Paris appearance at the Opéra-Comique in 1917 as Violetta in La traviata. She portrayed Juliette in Charles Gounod's Roméo et Juliette at the Paris Opéra in 1920.

In 1923, she made the historic (some say first) recording of the Jules Massenet opera Manon, conducted by Henri Büsser, for Pathé Records. In December of that year, she sang the title role in Esclarmonde by Massenet during the opera's revival at the Paris Opéra.

For more than twenty years, Heldy was France's leading opera star, while gaining international recognition through her performances at La Scala in Milan and at the Royal Opera House in London. In 1936 she participated in the movie Opéra de Paris.

She retired in 1939, residing at Château de Mivoisin, a 36 square kilometre property located 1½ hours south of Paris in Dammarie-sur-Loing, Loiret.

She married business tycoon Marcel Boussac, whose holdings included the House of Dior. A thoroughbred horse racing fan, her husband operated one of the most successful stables in racing history and she owned several stakes race winners herself.

Heldy died in 1973 and was buried in the Montmartre Cemetery, Paris. The "Prix Fondation Fanny Heldy" is awarded to one soprano each year for recording excellence.
