= Marie-Guillemine Benoist =

French Neoclassical artist (1768–1826)

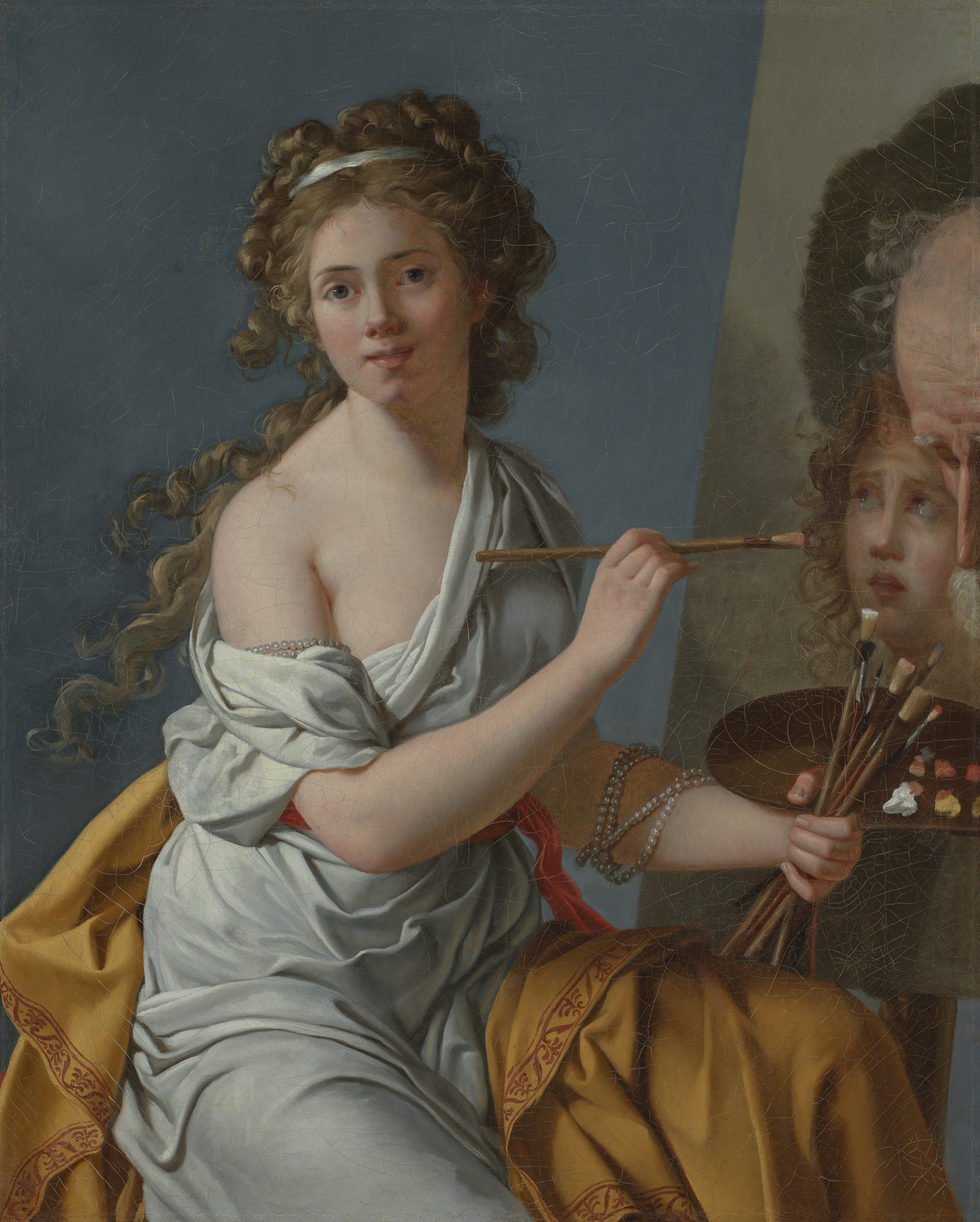
- Self-portrait Copying David's Belisarius, 1786 (Staatliche Kunsthalle Karlsruhe)
- Born: Marie Guillemine Laville-Leroux; 18 December 1768; Paris, France
- Died: 8 October 1826 (aged 57); Paris, France
- Citizenship: France
- Education: Elisabeth Vigée Le Brun, Jacques-Louis David
- Known for: Painting
- Movement: Neoclassicism
- Spouse: Pierre-Vincent Benoist (m. 1793)

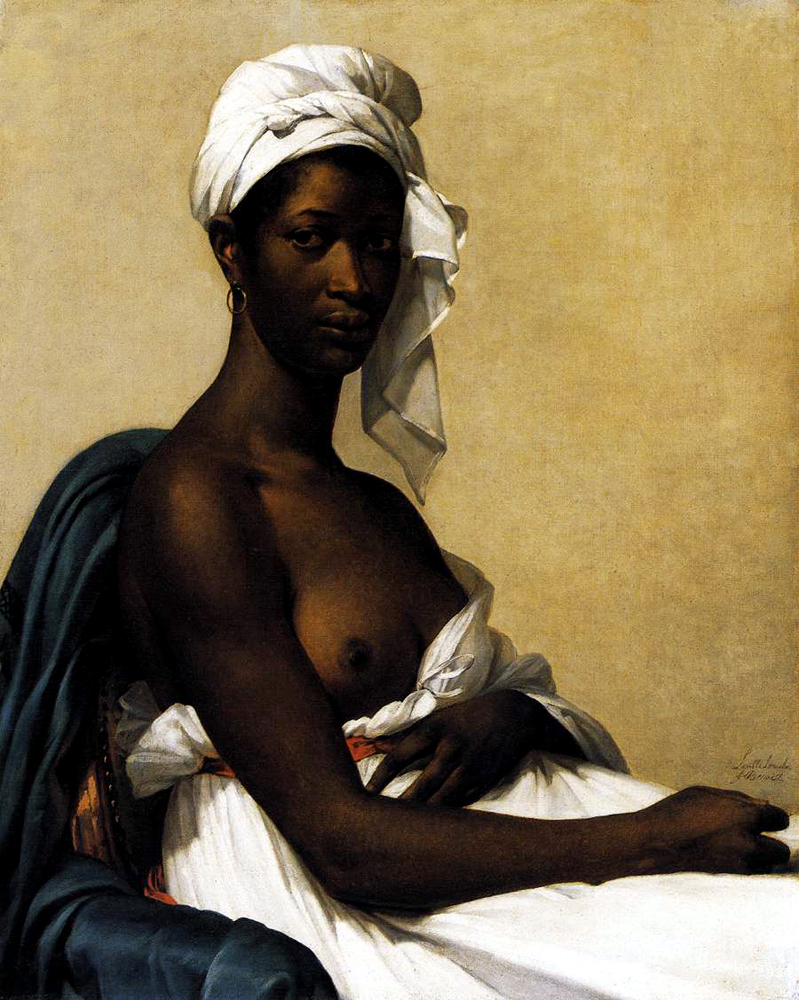
Marie-Guillemine Benoist Portrait d'une négresse, now known as Portrait of Madeleine 1800, Musée du Louvre.

Marie-Guillemine Benoist, born Marie-Guillemine Laville-Leroux (18 December 1768 – 8 October 1826), was a French neoclassical, historical, and genre painter.

== Early life ==
Marie Guillemine Laville-Leroux was born in Paris, the daughter of a civil servant, on 18 December 1768. Her training as an artist began in 1781 under Élisabeth Vigée Le Brun, and she entered Jacques-Louis David's atelier in 1786 along with her sister Marie-Élisabeth Laville-Leroux.

== Career ==
She first exhibited in the Exposition de la Jeunesse in 1784, showing a portrait of her father and two pastel studies of heads. She continued to exhibit at the Exposition until 1788. The poet Charles-Albert Demoustier, who met her in 1784, was inspired by her in creating the character Émilie in his work Lettres à Émilie sur la mythologie (1801).

In 1791, Laville-Leroux exhibited for the first time at the Paris Salon, displaying her mythology-inspired picture Psyché faisant ses adieux à sa famille. Another of her paintings of this period, L'Innocence entre la vertu et le vice, is similarly mythological and reveals her feminist interests — in this picture, vice is represented by a man, although it was traditionally represented by a woman. In 1793, she married the lawyer Pierre-Vincent Benoist.

Her work, reflecting the influence of Jacques-Louis David, tended increasingly toward history painting by 1795. In 1800, Benoist exhibited Portrait d'une négresse (as of 2019 renamed Portrait of Madeleine) in the Salon. Six years previously, slavery had been abolished, and this image became a symbol for women's emancipation and black people's rights. James Smalls, a professor of Art History at the University of Maryland, declared that "the painting is an anomaly because it presents a black person as the sole aestheticized subject and object of a work of art." The picture was acquired by Louis XVIII for France in 1818.

An important commission for a full-length portrait of Napoléon Bonaparte — Premier Consul Français in this period — was awarded to her in 1803. This portrait was to be sent to the city of Ghent, newly ceded to France by the Treaty of Lunéville in 1801. Other honors came to her; she was awarded a Gold Medal in the Salon of 1804 and received a governmental allowance.

Her career was harmed by political developments, however, when her husband Comte Benoist, the supporter of royalist causes, was nominated in the Conseil d'État during the post-1814 Bourbon Restoration. Despite being at the height of her popularity, "she was obliged to abandon painting" and pursue women's causes, due in part to her devoir de réserve ("tactful withdrawal") in the face of the growing wave of conservatism in European society.

Her last entry to the Salon was in 1812. She died in Paris in 1826, having painted few items in the years before this.

== Works ==
- Self-portrait, 1786 (Staatliche Kunsthalle Karlsruhe);
- Psyché faisant ses adieux a sa famille (1791);
- L'Innocence entre la vertu et le vice;
- Portrait of Madeleine (previously known as Portrait d'une négresse (1800, Musée du Louvre));
- Portrait of Madame Philippe Panon Debassayns de Richmont and Her Son Eugene (1802, Metropolitan Museum of Art);
- Portrait de Napoléon (1804, court of Ghent);
- Portrait du Maréchal Brune (1805, détruit; une copie se trouve au Musée du Château de Versailles);
- Portrait de Pauline Borghèse (1807, Musée du Château de Versailles);
- Portrait de Marie-Élise, grande duchesse de Toscane (Pinacoteca Nazionale, Lucca);
- Portrait de l'impératrice Marie-Louise (Château de Fontainebleau);
- La lecture de la Bible, (1810, musée municipal, Louviers);
- La Consultation ou La Diseuse de bonne-aventure, Saintes Musée municipal.

== Gallery ==
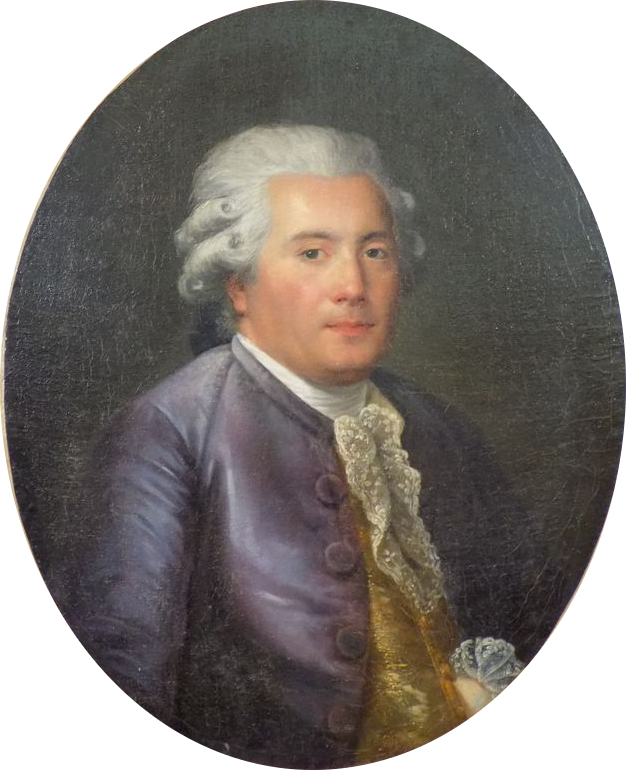
Portrait of René Delaville-Leroulx (the artist's father), 1784 (private collection)

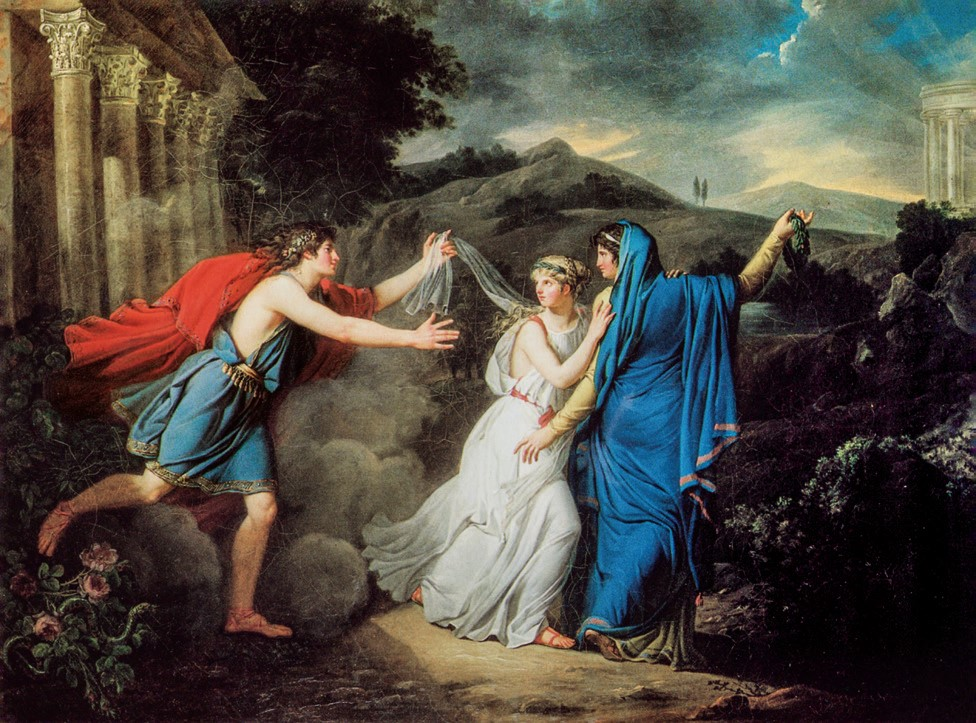
Innocence between Vice and Virtue, 1790 (private collection)

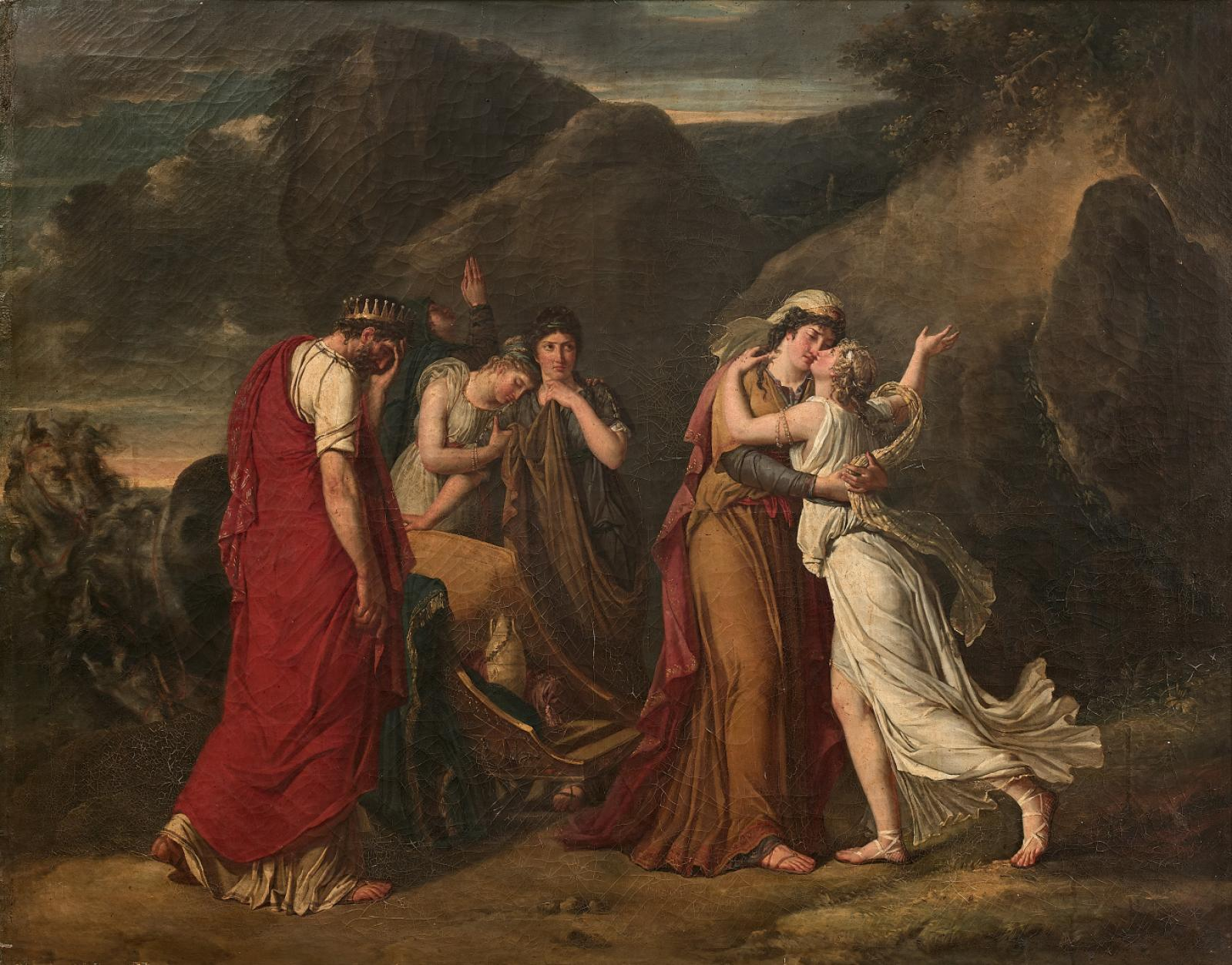
Psyche Bidding Farewell to Her Family, 1791 (Fine Arts Museums of San Francisco)

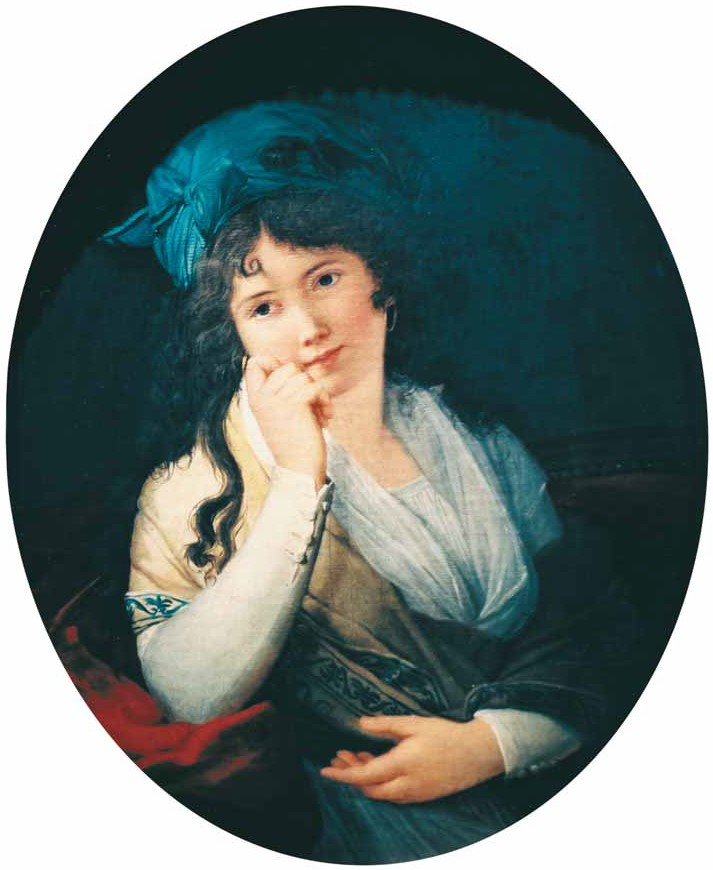
Portrait of the artist, circa 1796 (private collection)

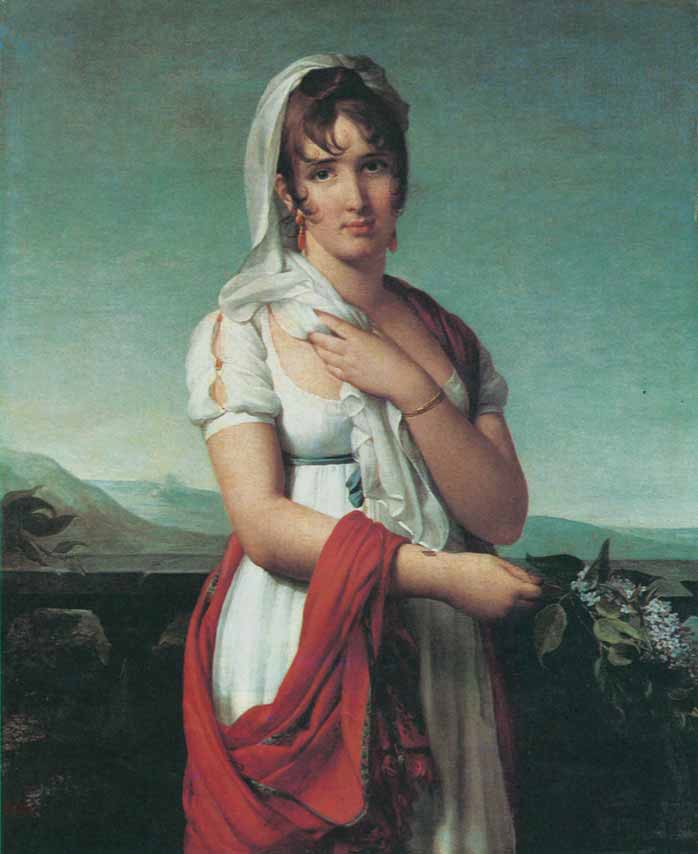
Portrait of Zoé Talon du Cayla, future comtesse du Cayla, 1801 (private collection)

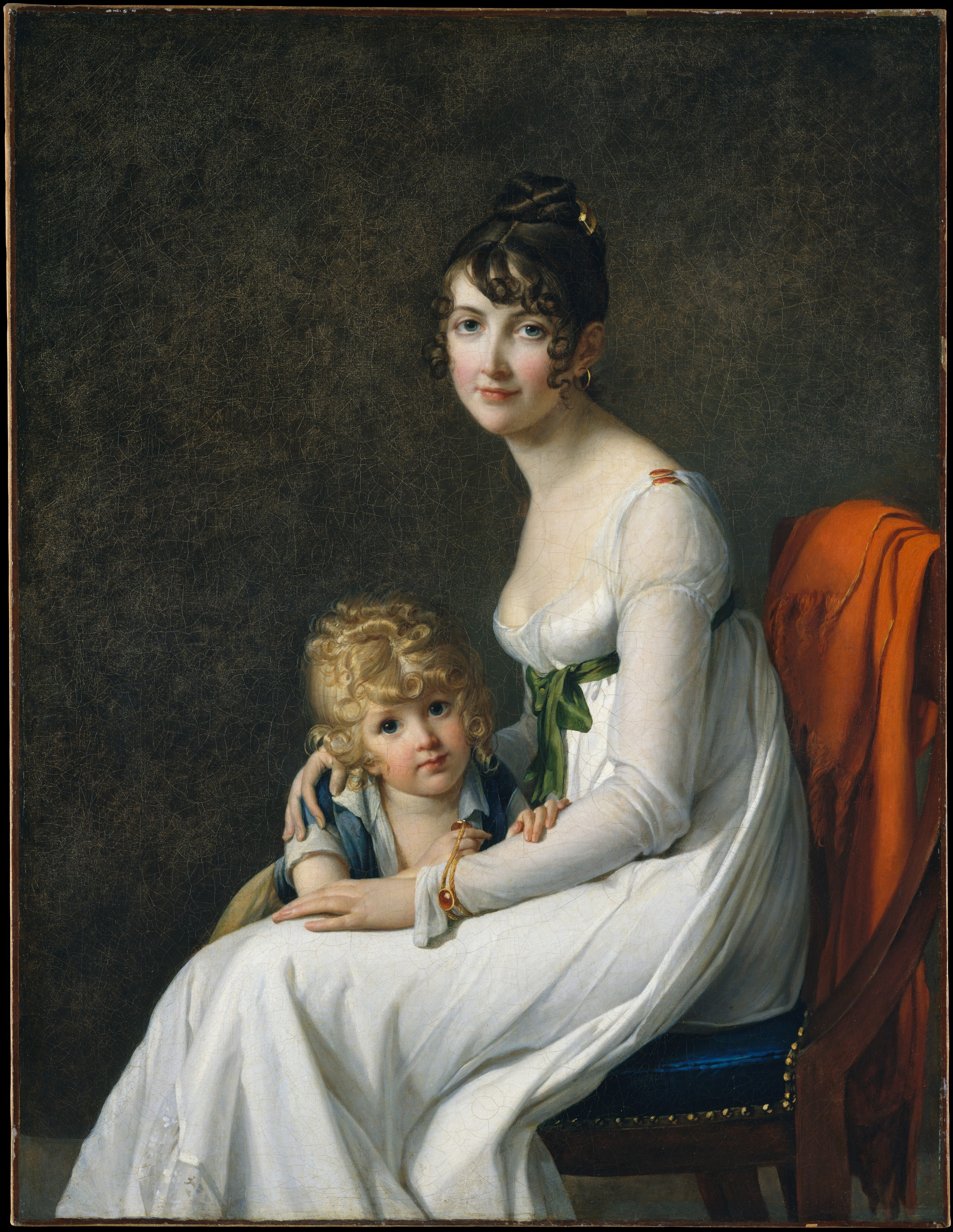
Madame Philippe Panon Desbassayns de Richemont (Jeanne Eglé Mourgue) and Her Son Eugène, circa 1802 (Metropolitan Museum of Art)

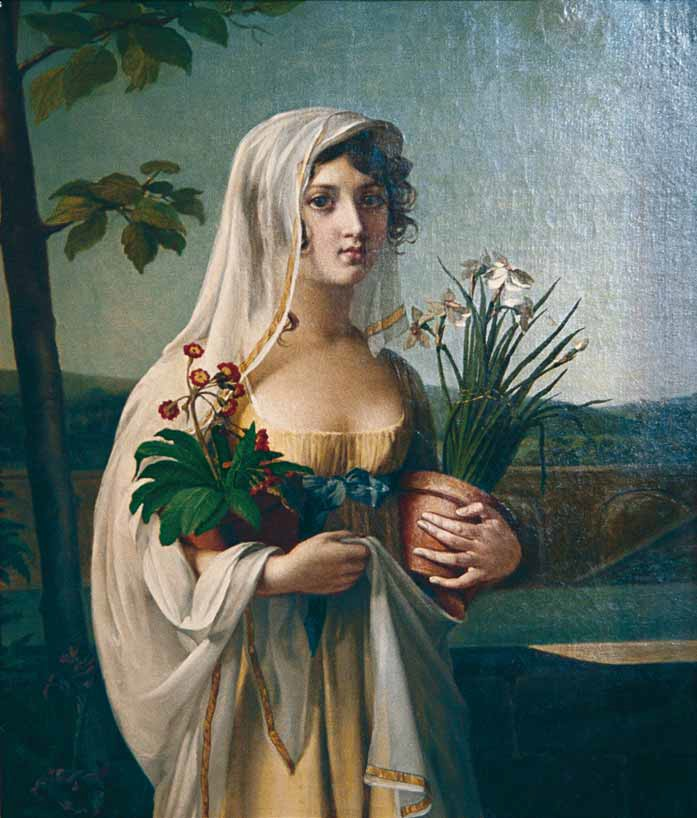
A young woman carrying two flower pots, circa 1802 (private collection)

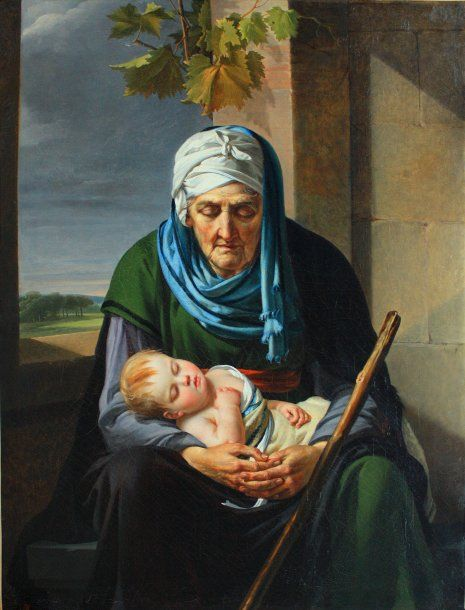
The Sleep of Childhood and that of Old Age, 1806 (private collection)

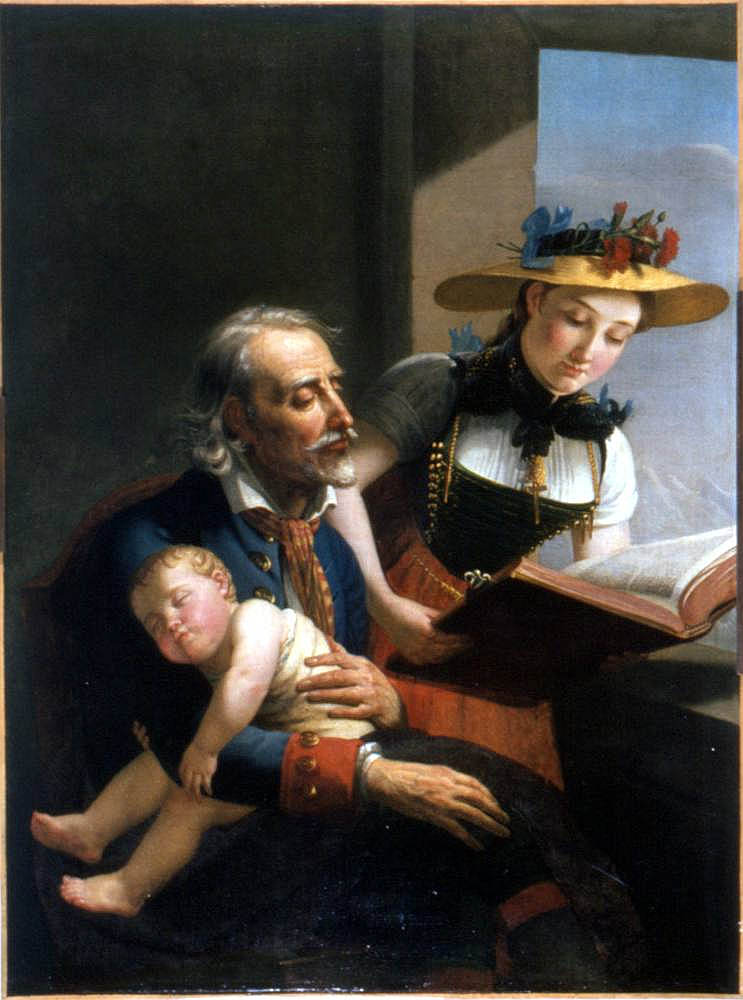
Reading from the Bible, circa 1810, Louviers' Museum

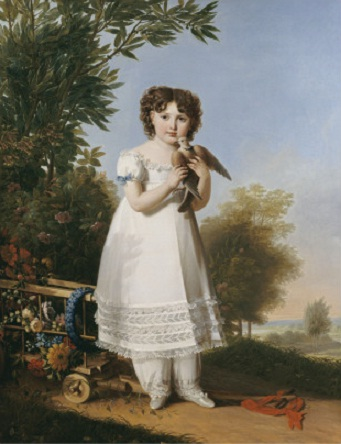
Elisa Napoléone Baciocchi, 1810, Palace of Fontainebleau

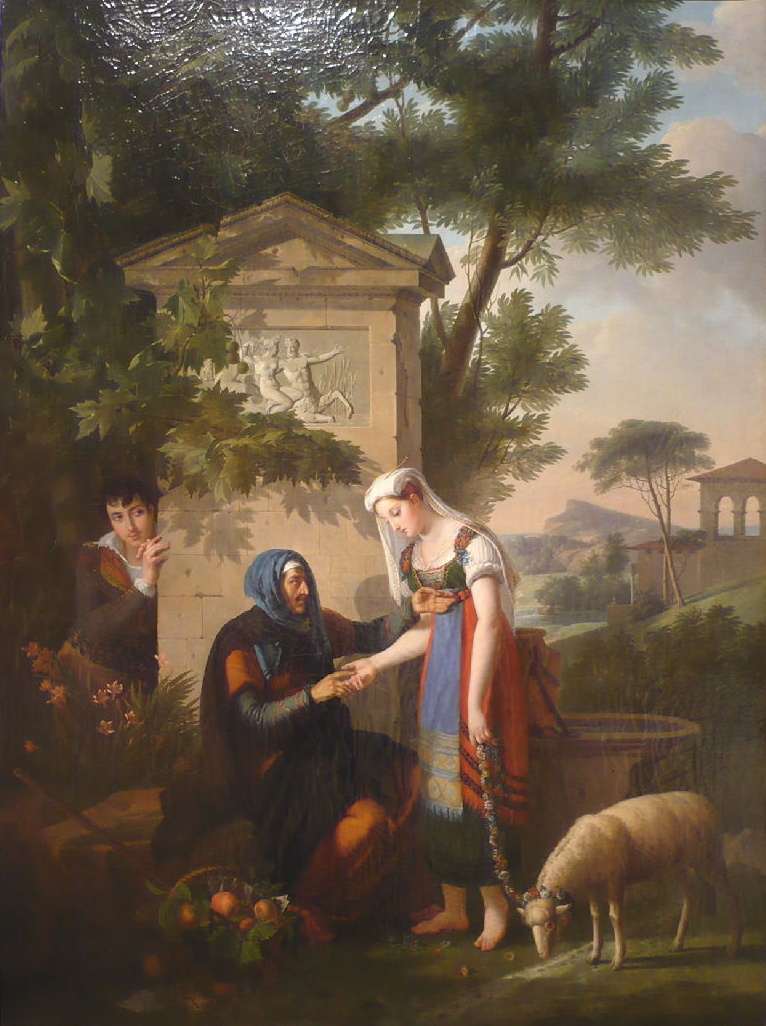
The Fortune Teller, 1812 (Musée de l'Échevinage, Saintes

== See also ==
- fr:Devoir de réserve dans la fonction publique française

== Bibliography ==
- Marie-Juliette Ballot, Une élève de David, La Comtesse Benoist, l'Émilie de Demoustier, 1768–1826, Plon, Paris, 1914.
- Astrid Reuter, Marie-Guilhelmine Benoist, Gestaltungsräume einer Künstlerin um 1800, Lukas Verlag, Berlin, 2002.
