= Principality of Lucca and Piombino =

State in Tuscany (1805–1814)

Principality of Lucca and Piombino Principauté de Lucques et Piombino (French) Principato di Lucca e Piombino (Italian)
- 1805–1814
- Flag Coat of arms

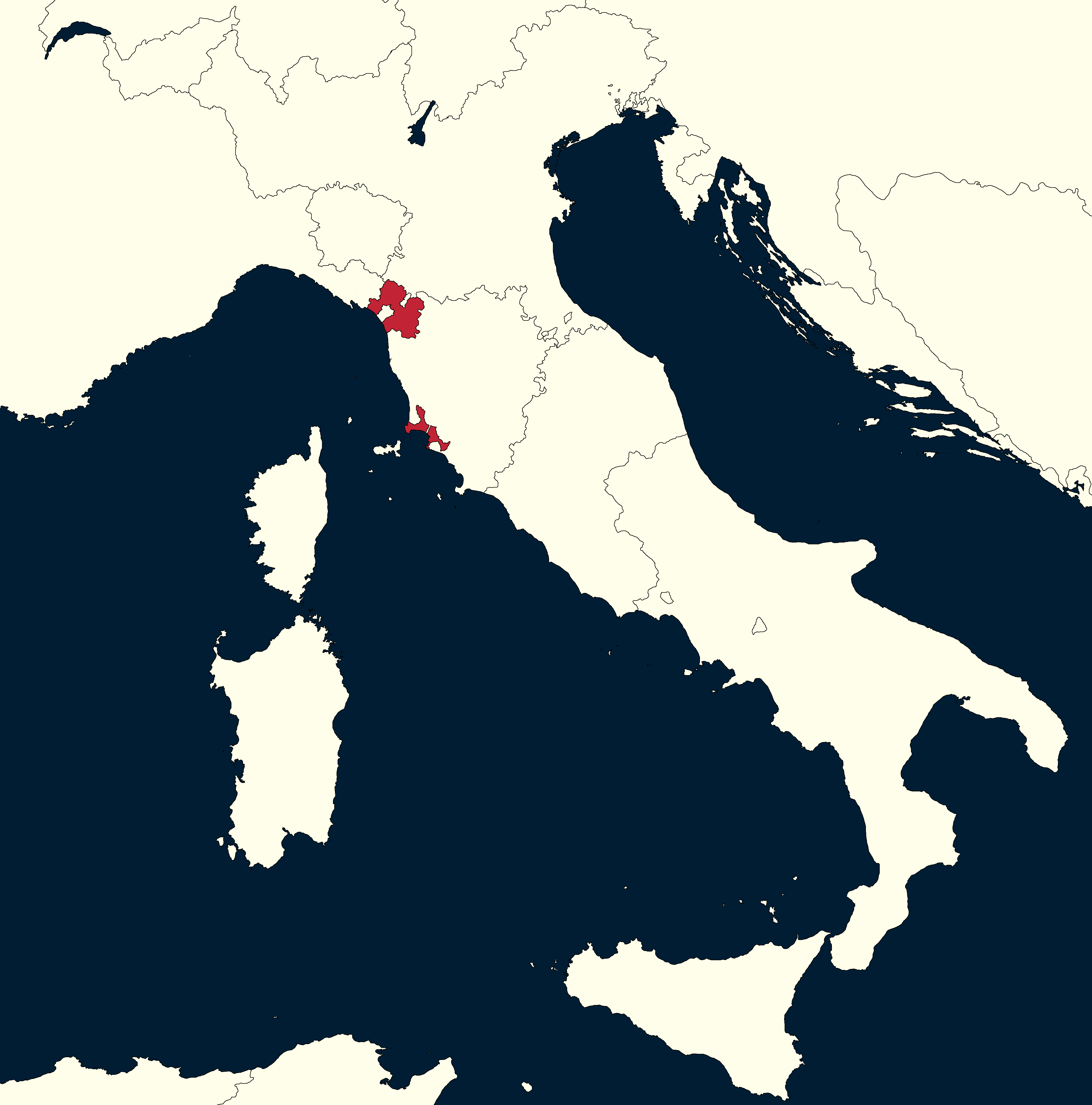
- Principality of Lucca in 1806
- Status: Client state of the French Empire
- Capital: Lucca
- Common languages: Italian, French
- Religion: Roman Catholic
- Government: Principality
- Princess/Prince
  - 1805–1809: Elisa & Felice
- Historical era: Napoleonic Wars
  - Treaty of Pressburg: 23 June 1805
  - Congress of Vienna: 3 March 1814

Population
  - 1808: 145,000
- Currency: French Franc
Preceded by
| Republic of Lucca |
| Principality of Piombino |
| Duchy of Massa and Carrara |
Succeeded by
| Duchy of Lucca |
| Grand Duchy of Tuscany |
- Today part of: Italy

The Principality of Lucca and Piombino was created in July 1805 by Napoleon I for his sister Elisa Bonaparte. It was a statelet located on the central Italian Peninsula (present-day Italy) and was a client state of Napoleonic France.

== Formation ==
The state was the result of the unification of the newly established Principality of Lucca, corresponding to the ancient Republic occupied by France since late 1799, and the erstwhile Principality of Piombino, which had also been occupied in 1804 and bestowed by Napoleon upon his sister Elisa, with the title of Duchess of Portoferraio, in March 1805. The combined principalities then were ruled as a single monarchy. Elisa was the effective ruler; her husband, Felice Pasquale Baciocchi, was formally appointed Prince of Lucca at the request of the population, who hoped to maintain at least a semblance of independence from France. In 1806, the neighbouring territories of the former Duchy of Massa and Carrara and the former Este Garfagnana were also annexed to the Principality.

== Rule ==
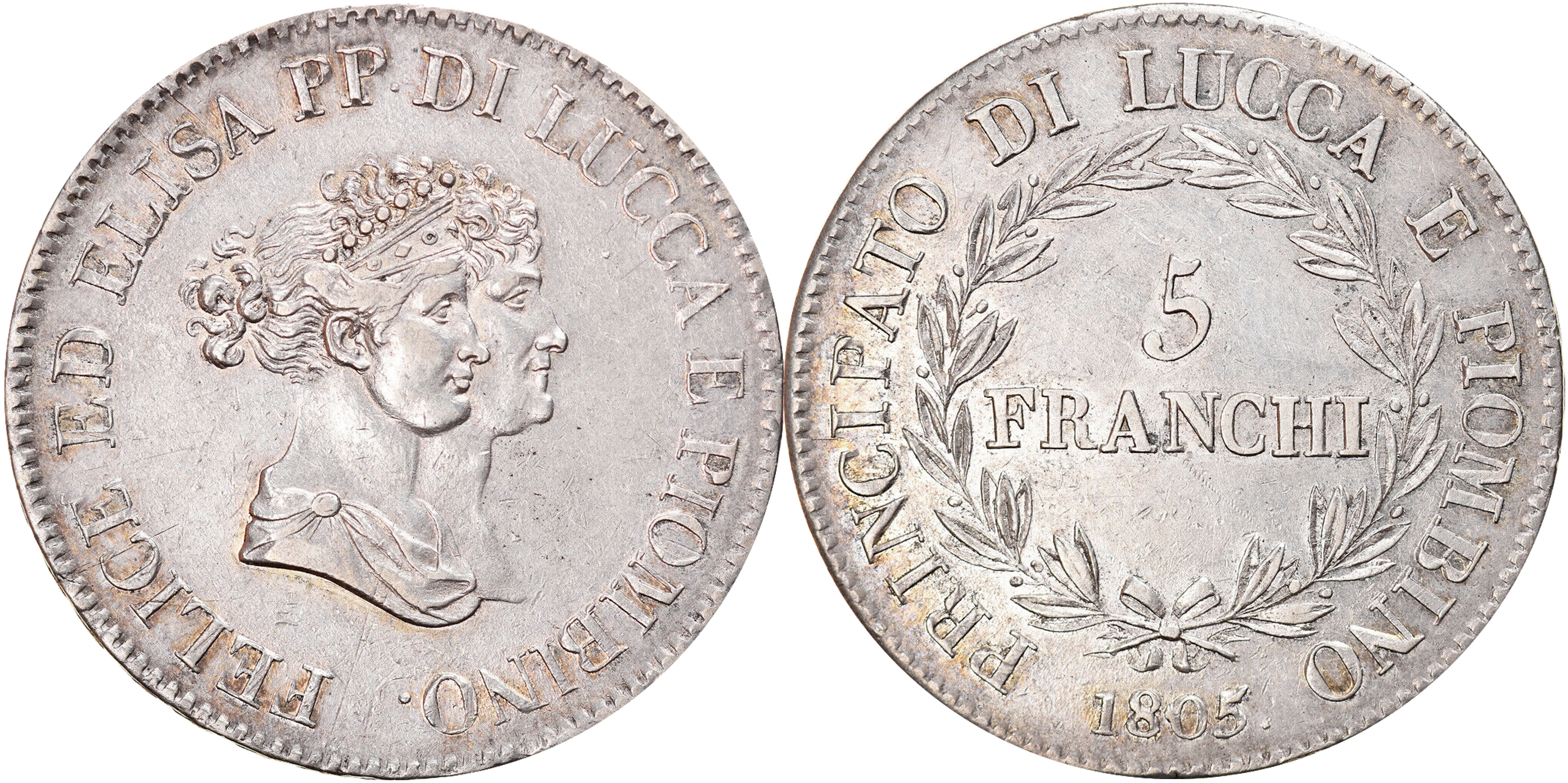
Silver coin: 5 Franchi of Principality of Lucca and Piombino, 1805, with the front side is the portrait of the couple Prince Felix and Elisa Bonaparte

The Constitution of the principality was written by Napoleon on 22 June (1805), establishing a Council of State to assist the prince and a legislative Senate.

The principality adopted the French franc as its currency, though few special local coins were minted.

On 3 March 1809, as part of the Treaty of Fontainebleau, her brother Napoleon created the Grand Duchy of Tuscany, with Elisa ruling as Grand Duchess of all Tuscany from Florence. The region had been annexed to the French Empire two years before, from the former Kingdom of Etruria (1801-1807). Henceforth the Principality of Lucca and Piombino became part of the Grand Duchy of Tuscany, and consequently a territory of the First French Empire. It did have special status, and a prefect was appointed (Antoine-Marie-Pierre de Hautmesnil). However, the territory was never named a Department of France.

== End ==
In 1814, the Imperial Austrian Army occupied Lucca, ending French control with the fall of Napoleon. Under the Congress of Vienna Piombino was given to the Grand Duchy of Tuscany, and Elba to the exiled Napoleon.

Lucca was restored to separate state status as the Duchy of Lucca (1815–1847). The Congress of Vienna (1814–1815) bestowed the duchy upon the Infanta of Spain Maria Louisa, erstwhile Queen of Etruria and the matriarch of the House of Bourbon-Parma. This was a form of compensation for not having returned their Duchy of Parma to them and instead having granted it to Napoleon's wife, Marie-Louise of Habsburg-Lorraine. Initially the Infanta stubbornly opposed, refusing to move from Rome where she was in exile, and accepted the new duchy only after the 1817 Treaty of Paris awarded her, her son Charles Louis and his male successors the right of reversion over their eponymous duchy upon the death of Marie-Louise of Habsburg-Lorraine.

== See also ==
- Villa Reale di Marlia — royal estate of Elisa Bonaparte in the Principality.

== Bibliography ==
- Claude Drigon, Nouveau traité historique et archéologique de la vraie et parfaite science des armoiries
- L'Univers, histoire et description de tous les peuples
- Marie Nicolas Bouillet, Dictionnaire universel d'histoire et de géographie,
- Gérard Hubert, La sculpture dans l'Italie napoléonienne,
