= Jérôme Napoléon Charles Bonaparte =

Army officer and son of Jérôme Bonaparte (1814–1847)

Jérôme Bonaparte
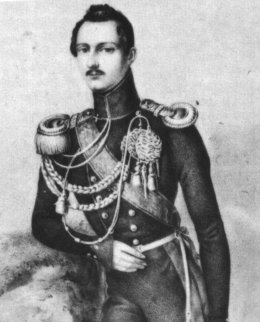
- Born: 24 August 1814; Trieste, Italy
- Died: 12 May 1847 (aged 32); Florence, Italy
Names
- Jérôme Napoléon Charles Bonaparte
- House: Bonaparte
- Father: Jérôme Bonaparte
- Mother: Catharina of Württemberg

Prince Jérôme Napoléon Charles Bonaparte (24 August 1814 – 12 May 1847) was the son of Jérôme Bonaparte and a nephew of Napoleon I, Emperor of France, and army officer of the German kingdom of Württemberg.

== Life ==
Jérôme Napoléon was the firstborn child of Jérôme Bonaparte and his second wife Princess Catharina of Württemberg, born in Trieste. The previous year they had been deposed as King and Queen of Westphalia, a kingdom created for Jérôme by his elder brother Napoleon. Jérôme Napoléon's maternal grandfather, King Frederick I of Württemberg, had given his son-in-law and daughter the title Prince and Princess of Montfort, and Jérôme Napoléon used this courtesy title throughout most of his life.

From 1832, Jérôme and his family lived at the court of his maternal uncle, King William I of Württemberg. He studied at the military academy of Ludwigsburg and served in the army, attaining the ranks of Hauptmann (captain) in 1834, major in 1840, and finally colonel.

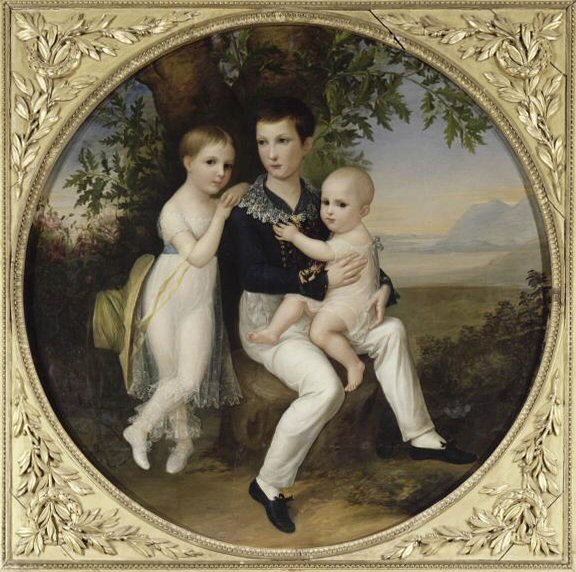
Jérôme Napoléon (centre), with younger brother Napoleon Joseph on his knees and sister Mathilde to the left.

In the early 1840s he met and received the author Charles-Victor Prévot, vicomte d'Arlincourt in Stuttgart, who wrote of the young prince: "Prince Jérôme of Montfort, gifted with a handsome face and a graceful physiognomy, is French in spirit and in heart. He speaks and dreams of nothing but France. In speaking of the sons of that great nation he always says 'we'. His position at Stuttgart is brilliant; and yet it seems he would prefer the most modest home in France to the most beautiful foreign palace. I told him of the passing of Napoléon; he listened rapt. I spoke to him of the coming of the Duke of Bourdeaux; he listened with interest. 'Eternal glory', the prince told me, 'to whoever makes France happy!' Such too was my thought."

Of poor health since childhood, in 1845 Jérôme sought leave to let him enter France, to visit Vernet-les-Bains with its celebrated spring water, which the government of King Louis-Philippe I refused. He died, unmarried and childless in Florence in 1847, aged 32. As then the eldest legitimate son of Jérôme Bonaparte, he had stood to inherit his titles and claims; instead his younger brother Napoléon Joseph Charles Paul Bonaparte succeeded to the Westphalia claim. The latter's son Napoléon Victor Bonaparte became senior male/head of the House of Bonaparte.

== Ancestry ==
Ancestors of Jérôme Napoléon Charles Bonaparte

8. Nobile Giuseppe Maria Buonaparte
4. Nobile Carlo Maria Buonaparte
9. Maria Saveria Paravicini
2. Jérôme Bonaparte, King of Westphalia and Prince of Montfort
10. Giovanni Geronimo Ramolino
5. Maria Letizia Ramolino
11. Angela Maria Pietrasanta
1. Jérôme Napoléon Charles Bonaparte, Prince of Montfort
12. Frederick II Eugene, Duke of Württemberg
6. Frederick I of Württemberg
13. Margravine Friederike of Brandenburg-Schwedt
3. Princess Catharina of Württemberg
14. Charles William Ferdinand, Duke of Brunswick-Wolfenbüttel
7. Duchess Augusta of Brunswick-Wolfenbüttel
15. Princess Augusta of Great Britain
