= Mathilde Bonaparte =

French princess

- Princesse Française
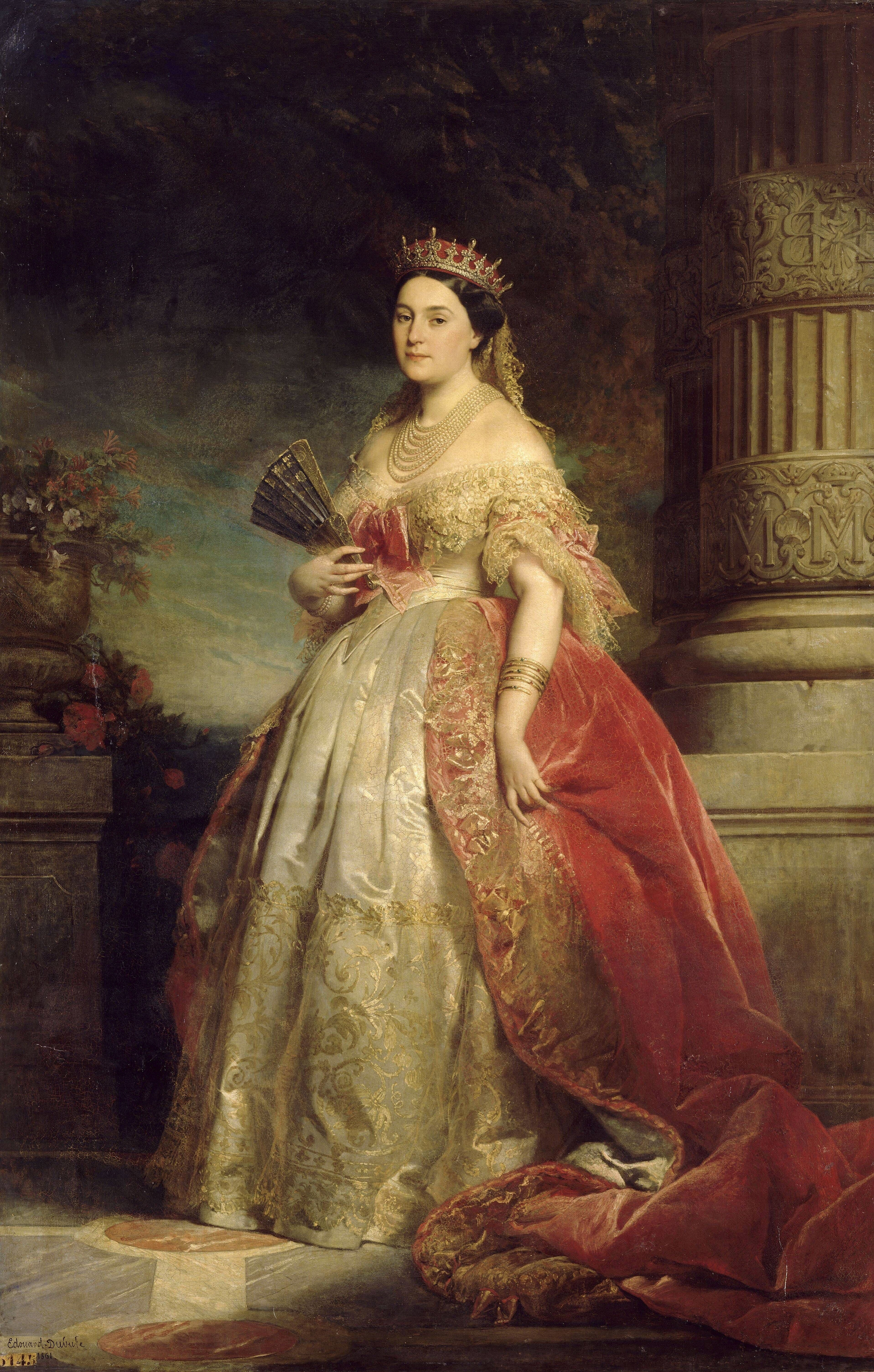
- Portrait of Mathilde Bonaparte by Édouard Dubufe, 1861
- Born: 27 May 1820; Trieste, Austrian Empire
- Died: 2 January 1904 (aged 83); Paris, France
- Spouse: Anatoly Nikolaievich Demidov, 1st Prince of San Donato (m. 1840; sep. 1843)
Names
- Mathilde Laetitia Wilhelmine Bonaparte
- House: Bonaparte
- Father: Jérôme Bonaparte
- Mother: Catharina of Württemberg
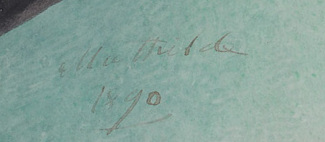
- Signature

Mathilde Laetitia Wilhelmine Bonaparte, Princesse Française, Princess of San Donato (27 May 1820 – 2 January 1904), was a French princess and salonnière. She was a daughter of Napoleon's brother Jérôme Bonaparte and his second wife, Catharina of Württemberg, daughter of King Frederick I of Württemberg and Duchess Auguste Karoline of Brunswick-Wolfenbüttel.

== Biography ==
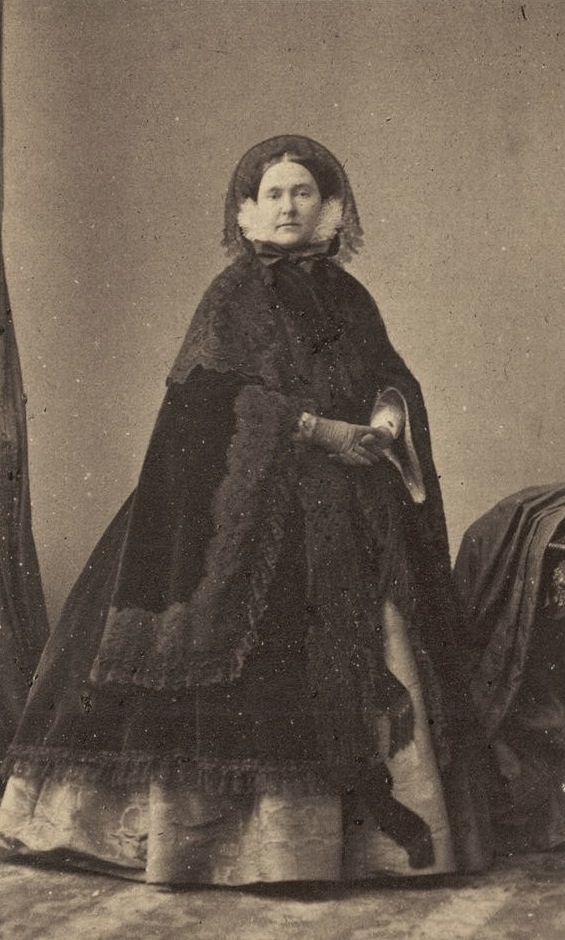
Princess Mathilde Bonaparte in 1860, by André-Adolphe-Eugène Disdéri

Born in Trieste on 27 May 1820, Mathilde Bonaparte was raised in Florence and Rome. She was originally engaged to her first cousin, the future Napoleon III of France, but the engagement was cancelled following his imprisonment at Ham. She married a rich Russian nobleman, Anatoly Nikolaievich Demidov, 1st Prince of San Donato, on 1 November 1840 in Rome. Anatole was raised to the position of Prince by Grand Duke Leopold II of Tuscany shortly before the wedding to fulfill the wishes of Mathilde's father and to preserve Mathilde's position as Princess. Anatole's princely title was never recognised in Russia. They had no children.

The marriage between these two strong and prominent personalities was stormy. Prince Demidov insisted on keeping his mistress, Valentine, Duchess of Dino, which of course was fiercely resisted by Mathilde. In 1846, Mathilde fled the household for Paris with her new lover Émilien de Nieuwerkerke and with Anatole's jewelry. The jewelry constituted the dowry that Anatole was forced to bankroll for his father-in-law, so it formed the property of Anatole.

Princess Mathilde's mother was Emperor Nicholas I of Russia's first cousin, and the emperor supported Mathilde in her clashes with her spouse, a Russian subject. As consequence, Anatole chose to live much of his remaining life outside Russia.

The terms of the separation announced by the Tribunal in Saint Petersburg forced Anatole to pay annual alimony of 200,000 French francs. Anatole vigorously pursued the return of his property, which led Mathilde and her strong circle of literary friends to mount highly personal and unfair counter-attacks using the public media. In the end, Anatole's heirs never recovered his property since Mathilde's last will was altered towards the end of her life.

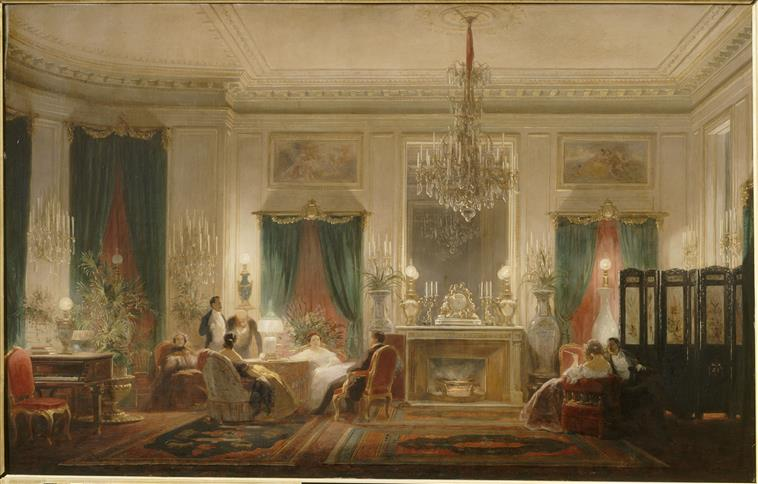
Inside Princesse Mathilde's mansion, rue de Courcelles (until 1857)

Princess Mathilde lived in a mansion in Paris, where, as a prominent member of the new aristocracy during and after the Second French Empire, she entertained eminent men of arts and letters at her salon. She disliked etiquette, but welcomed her visitors, according to Abel Hermant, with an extreme refinement of snobbery and politeness. Théophile Gautier was employed as her librarian in 1868. Referring to her uncle, Emperor Napoleon I, she once told Marcel Proust: "If it weren't for him, I'd be selling oranges in the streets of Ajaccio."

At the fall of the monarchy in 1870, she lived in Belgium for a while, but soon returned to Paris. Throughout her time in France, she maintained ties with the Imperial court in Saint Petersburg, her maternal cousins. In 1873, following the death of Prince Demidov in 1870, she married the artist and poet Claudius Marcel Popelin (1825–1892). She was the only member of the Bonaparte family to stay in France after May 1886, when the French Republic expelled the princes of the former ruling dynasties. In 1896, she was invited to a ceremony at Invalides by Félix Faure at a visit of Emperor Nicholas II Russia and his wife Empress Alexandra.

She died in Paris on 2 January 1904 aged 83.

== In culture ==
An aged Princess Mathilde makes a brief appearance in Proust's À l'ombre des jeunes filles en fleurs (In the Shadow of Young Girls in Flower), the second volume of In Search of Lost Time. She mentions that if she wants to visit les Invalides, she does not need an invitation: she has her own set of keys.

Princess Mathilde is referred to several times in Gore Vidal's novel 1876 as being a friend of the fictional narrator, Charles Schermerhorn Schuyler. She is also mentioned by the Portuguese romantic realist Eça de Queiroz in his posthumous novel To the Capital.

== Ancestry ==
Ancestors of Mathilde Bonaparte

8. Nobile Giuseppe Maria Buonaparte
4. Nobile Carlo Maria Buonaparte
9. Maria Saveria Paravicini
2. Jérôme Bonaparte, King of Westphalia and Prince of Montfort
10. Giovanni Geronimo Ramolino
5. Maria Letizia Ramolino
11. Angela Maria Pietrasanta
1. Mathilde Bonaparte, Princesse Française
12. Frederick II Eugene, Duke of Württemberg
6. Frederick I of Württemberg
13. Margravine Friederike of Brandenburg-Schwedt
3. Princess Catharina of Württemberg
14. Charles William Ferdinand, Duke of Brunswick-Wolfenbüttel
7. Duchess Augusta of Brunswick-Wolfenbüttel
15. Princess Augusta of Great Britain

== Bibliography ==
=== Sources ===
- Richardson, Joanna (1969). Princess Mathilde. Weidenfeld & Nicolson. ISBN 978-0297763369.
