= Prince of Montfort =

Württemberg princely title granted to Jérôme Bonaparte

- Arms of Jérôme Bonaparte as Prince of Montfort
- Creation date: 31 July 1816
- Created by: Frederick I of Württemberg
- Peerage: Kingdom of Württemberg
- First holder: Jérôme Bonaparte
- Present holder: Charles, Prince Napoléon
- Heir apparent: Jean-Christophe, Prince Napoléon
- Status: Extant

Prince of Montfort (French: Prince de Montfort; German: Fürst von Montfort) is a Württemberg princely title granted to Jérôme Bonaparte, former King of Westphalia, after the fall of the First French Empire. The title was conferred by Frederick I of Württemberg on 31 July 1816. A princely diploma issued by King Frederick I of Württemberg for Jérôme Napoleon Montfort, dated 1 August 1816, is preserved in the Landesarchiv Baden-Württemberg.

The title was associated with the exile of Jérôme Bonaparte and his second wife, Catharina of Württemberg, daughter of King Frederick I. Sources differ in their rendering of the style: the Bibliothèque nationale de France describes Jérôme as comte de Montfort, a Württemberg title of 1816, while the Fondation Napoléon lists him as having been made prince de Montfort by King Frederick I of Württemberg. The German Westphalian History portal gives the reference form Buonaparte, Fürst von Montfort from 31 July 1816 and identifies Catharina as Fürstin von Montfort.

== History ==
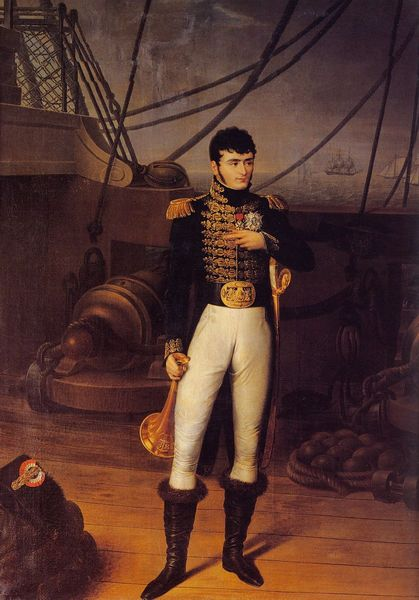
Jérôme Bonaparte, former King of Westphalia and Prince of Montfort.

Jérôme Bonaparte was the youngest brother of Napoleon I. In 1807 Napoleon made him King of Westphalia, a Napoleonic satellite kingdom created from territories in central and northern Germany. Jérôme lost the Westphalian throne in 1813 after the collapse of Napoleonic power in Germany.

After Napoleon's second abdication, Jérôme accepted the protection of his father-in-law, King Frederick I of Württemberg. In 1816 Frederick granted him the title of Prince of Montfort. Jérôme and Catharina then lived in exile under the name of Count and Countess of Montfort, especially during their residence in Austria.

The title should not be confused with a sovereign principality. It is a Württemberg noble title granted to a former king and imperial prince, and later functioned mainly as an exile or family style of the Bonapartes. The BnF authority record notes the alternative style comte de Montfort and distinguishes Jérôme Bonaparte from his son Jérôme Napoléon Charles Bonaparte, who was styled prince de Montfort as a courtesy title.

== Princes of Montfort ==
| No. | Holder | Period |
Creation by Frederick I of Württemberg
| I | Jérôme Bonaparte | 1816-1860 |
| II | Napoléon-Jérôme Bonaparte | 1860-1891 |
| III | Napoléon Victor Jérôme Frédéric Bonaparte | 1891-1926 |
| IV | Louis Jérôme Victor Emmanuel Léopold Marie Bonaparte | 1926-1997 |
| V | Charles Marie Jérôme Victor Napoléon Bonaparte | 1997-present |

== See also ==
- House of Bonaparte
- Jérôme Bonaparte
- Kingdom of Westphalia
- Catharina of Württemberg
- Württemberg
