= Ludwig Gottfried Blanc =

German philologist (1781–1866)

Ludwig Gottfried Blanc (19 September 1781 – 18 April 1866) was a German philologist and Dante scholar.

== Life ==
He was born in Berlin, Kingdom of Prussia, Holy Roman Empire, and after studying at the French Theological Seminary of Berlin, was called to a pastorate at Halle (1806). In 1811 he was suspected of having taken part in a conspiracy against the French occupation under King Jerome of Westphalia and was imprisoned in Magdeburg, and later in Kassel. In 1813, during the Wars of Liberation, he gained his release by a Russian skirmishing corps. He became a professor of Romance languages at the University of Halle in 1822, and from 1838 to 1860 was one of the preachers in the city's cathedral.

He was an authority on the Romance languages, and is especially known for his numerous and scholarly treatises on Dante.

== Death ==
Professor Blanc died in Halle (Saale), Province of Saxony, German Confederation on 18 April 1866.

== Selected works ==
- Grammatik der italienischen Sprache (1844), the first attempt to trace the history of the development of the forms and laws of the Italian language
- Vocabolario Dantesco, in Italian (1859), first published in French (1852).
- Handbuch des Wissenswürdigsten aus der Natur und Geschichte der Erde und ihrer Bewohner (Handbook of noteworthy facts from nature and the history of Earth and its inhabitants); 3 volumes, 8th edition 1868–69:
  - Volume 1. Allgemeine einleitung. Portugal. Spanien. Frankreich. Britisches Reich. Holland. Belgien Schweiz.
  - Volume 2. Skandinavisches Reich. Deutschland. Oesterreich. Italien. Griechenland. Russisches Reich.
  - Volume 3. Asien. Australien. Afrika. Amerika, Vollständiges register über alle drei theile.
- Dante, Divine Comedy / German translation with commentary, Die Göttliche Komödie des Dante Alighieri (1864).
