= Giuseppe Maria Buonaparte =

Corsican politician

- Born: 31 May 1713; Ajaccio
- Died: 13 December 1763 (aged 50); Ajaccio
- Spouses: Maria Saveria Paravicini (m. 1741; died bef. 1750); Maria Virginia Alata
- Children: Maria Gertrude, Sebastiano, Carlo, Marianna
- Parents: Sebastiano Nicola Buonaparte; Maria Anna Tusoli
- Relatives: Luciano Buonaparte (brother); Napoleon I of France (grandson) (Note: Also includes his older brother Joseph, and younger siblings Lucien, Elisa, Louis, Pauline, Caroline, and Jerome.)

Nobile Giuseppe Maria Buonaparte or Giuseppe Maria di Buonaparte (31 May 1713 – 13 December 1763) was a Corsican politician, best known as the paternal grandfather of Napoleon I of France.

== Early life ==
He was the son of Sebastiano Nicola Buonaparte (1683–1720) and his wife Maria Anna Tusoli (1690–1760). According to a genealogy requested by Maria Saveria Paravicini, wife of Giuseppe Maria Buonaparte, Buonaparte was a descendant of William IX of Montferrat and Borso d'Este.

== Political career ==
In 1749, Giuseppe was the delegate who represented the City of Ajaccio in the Council of Corte.

== Marriages and children ==
On 5 March 1741 at Ajaccio, Giuseppe married his first wife Nobile Maria Saveria Paravicini (born 7 September 1715 at Ajaccio, died before 1750). She was a daughter of two Nobile, Giuseppe Maria Paravicini and Anna Maria Salineri. Both her parents were members of the nobility of the Republic of Genoa. They had at least four children:

- Nobile Maria Gertrude Buonaparte (28 November 1741, Ajaccio – December, 1793). Married at Ajaccio, 25 June 1763 Nicola Luigi Paravisini, Chancellor of the City of Ajaccio (ca. 1739, Ajaccio – 8 May 1813, Ajaccio).
- Nobile Sebastiano Buonaparte (1743, Ajaccio – 24 November 1760, Ajaccio).
- Nobile Carlo Buonaparte (29 March 1746 – 24 February 1785). Married in June 1764, Maria Letizia Ramolino. They were the parents of Joseph Bonaparte, Napoleon I of France, Lucien Bonaparte, Elisa Bonaparte, Louis Bonaparte, Pauline Bonaparte, Caroline Bonaparte and Jérôme Bonaparte.
- Nobile Marianna Buonaparte, died young.

Maria predeceased her husband, and he married secondly Maria Virginia Alata (born 5 February 1725), a daughter of Domenico Alata. This marriage was probably childless.
