= Carlo Buonaparte =

Father of Napoleon Bonaparte (1746–1785)

- Noble Patrician of Tuscany
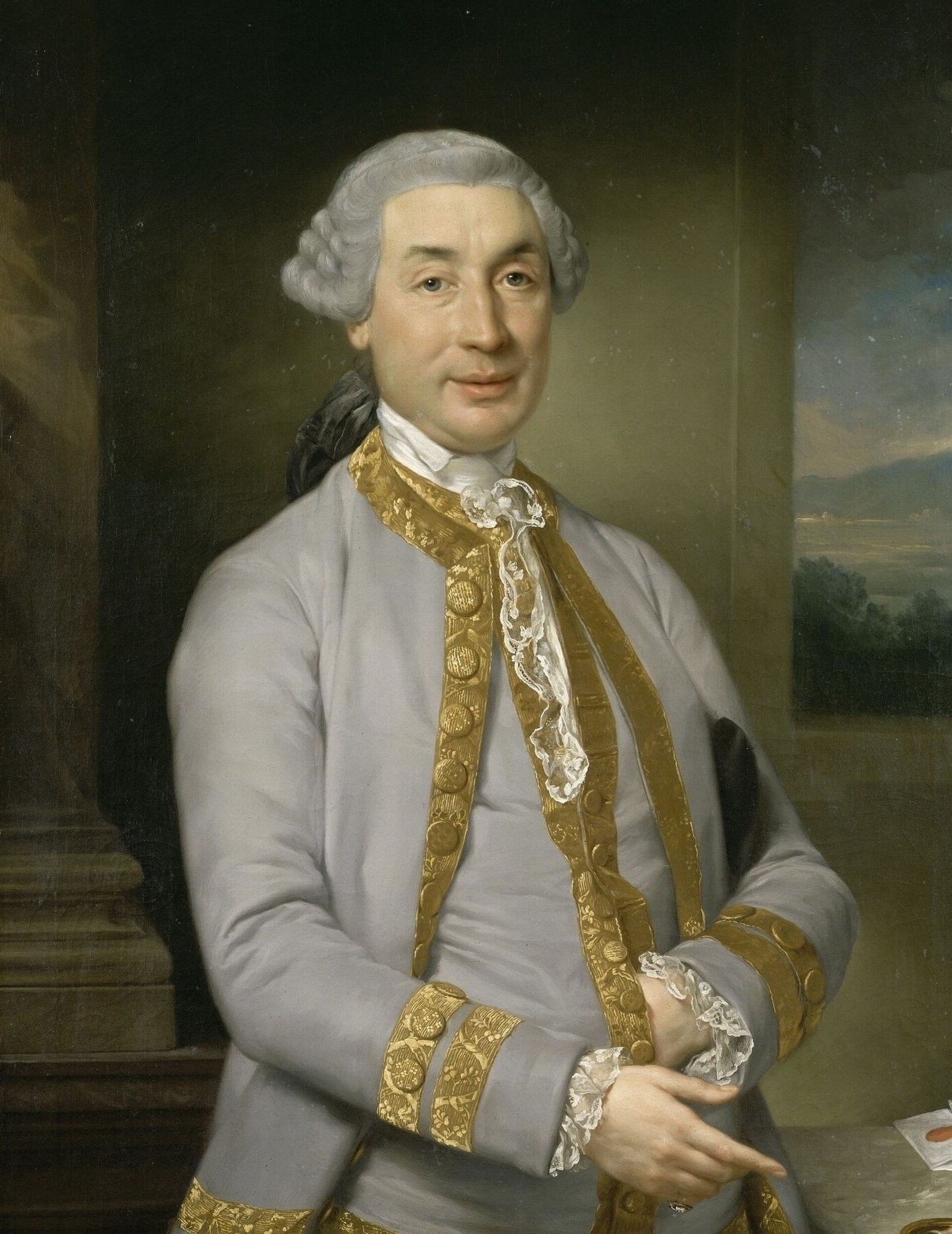
- c. 1766–1779 portrait
- Full name: Carlo Maria Buonaparte
- Born: 27 March 1746; Ajaccio, Corsica, Republic of Genoa
- Died: 24 February 1785 (aged 38); Montpellier, Hérault, Kingdom of France
- Buried: Imperial Chapel of Ajaccio, Corsica, France
- Noble family: Buonaparte
- Spouse: Maria Letizia Ramolino (m. 1764)
- Issue: Joseph I, King of Spain; Napoleon I, Emperor of the French; Lucien, 1st Prince of Canino and Musignano; Elisa, Grand Duchess of Tuscany; Louis I, King of Holland; Pauline, Princess and Duchess of Guastalla; Caroline, Queen of Naples; Jérôme Napoleon I, King of Westphalia
- Father: Giuseppe Maria Buonaparte
- Mother: Maria Saveria Paravicini

Carlo Maria Buonaparte (27 March 1746 – 24 February 1785), also known as Carlo Maria di Buonaparte and Charles-Marie Bonaparte, was a Corsican attorney, nobleman, and official, best known as the father of Napoleon Bonaparte and paternal grandfather of Napoleon III.

Initially a supporter of Corsican independence, he briefly served as an aide to Pasquale Paoli, fighting against the Republic of Genoa and later resisting the French invasion. After France annexed Corsica, he aligned with the new regime, and in 1777, he became the island’s representative at the court of Louis XVI. 20 years after his death, his second surviving son, Napoleon, became Emperor of the French, elevating several of his siblings to royal status through marriage and noble titles.

== Early life ==
Carlo Buonaparte was born in 1746 in Ajaccio, Corsica, then part of the Republic of Genoa, to Giuseppe Maria Buonaparte and his wife, Maria Saveria Paravicini. He had an older sister, Maria Gertrude (born 1741), and a brother, Sebastiano (born 1743). In 1749, Carlo's father represented Ajaccio at the Council of Corte. The Buonaparte family were of Tuscan origin. Carlo’s ancestor, Guglielmo di Buonaparte, served on Florence's Ghibelline-controlled municipal council in the 13th century. When the Guelphs faction took power, he and his family fled to Sarzana. In the 16th century, Guglielmo’s descendant, Francesco di Buonaparte, sailed from Liguria to Corsica in search of a new life.

Carlo initially followed in his father’s footsteps. He studied to be a lawyer at University of Pisa. Still, following a substantial inheritance from his father’s death, he left before earning his degree to tend to his inheritance and take charge of family responsibilities. On 2 June 1764, he married fourteen-year-old Maria Letizia Ramolino: the Ramolinos descended from noble Lombard antecedents and were established in Corsica for 250 years. Their marriage was arranged by their families. Economic convenience was one of several factors considered while arranging the match, the main considerations being cultural compatibility in matters such as speech dialect, church habits, food habits, attire, and other family traditions. Buonaparte’s new wife brought a dowry of thirty-one acres of land, including a mill and bakery, which yielded an annual income of roughly £10,000.

== French takeover ==
For a period after his marriage at Ajaccio on 2/7 June 1764, he worked as a secretary and personal assistant to Pasquale Paoli. He had a son, Napoleone, who died in infancy in 1765, as did a daughter. Paoli sent him to Rome to negotiate with Pope Clement XIII in 1766. He had enjoyed his time in Rome, up until being forced for reasons unknown back to Corsica in 1768 – though he had possibly enjoyed an affair with a married woman during his stay, which led to his departure. At the time of his return, the Republic of Genoa had offered Corsica to Louis XV as payment for a debt. The French were eager to obtain the strategically placed island to protect their own coasts, and Genoa was equally keen to relinquish control given their inability to resist growing independence movements. Political upheaval followed as France gained ownership of Corsica, and many of Paoli's supporters had to flee to the mountains. Buonaparte and his family, now boasting newborn Giuseppe, who was the first child to survive infancy, were included. The family eventually returned to the town, where Buonaparte's wife gave birth to a fourth child, Napoleone.

Soon after the French acquisition of the island, Carlo Buonaparte embraced the new government. He was appointed Assessor of the Royal Jurisdiction of Ajaccio and the neighbouring districts on 20 September 1769. Shortly after that, he became a Doctor of Law at the University of Pisa on 27 November 1769.

== Rise to prominence ==
In April 1770, the French administration created a Corsican Order of Nobility. Buonaparte became an advocate of the Superior Council of Corsica on 11 December 1769 and a Substitute Procurator of the King of France in Ajaccio in October 1770. Buonaparte already possessed the title of a "Noble Patrician of Tuscany" (Nobile Patrizio di Toscana) since 1769 by permission of the Archbishop of Pisa due to his ancestry, and had his nobility confirmed on 13 September 1771. He then became the assessor of the Royal Jurisdiction of Ajaccio in February 1771, Deputy of the Nobility in the General States of Corsica on 13 September 1771, Member of the Council of the Twelve Nobles of Dila (Western Corsica) in May 1772, Deputy of the Nobility of Corsica at the Royal French Court in July 1777 and finally he was named Corsica's representative to the Court of Louis XVI at Versailles in 1778.

Despite being honoured with many titles, Buonaparte's dissatisfied nature led him to embark on risky business enterprises. He made many claims on land and money through legal means, but his success was limited, and he burned through his finances rapidly. His apparent fondness for gambling worsened his monetary difficulties. Buonaparte noted his situation in his account book: "In Paris, I received 4,000 francs from the King and a fee of 1,000 crowns from the government, but I came back without a penny." By 1782, Buonaparte was growing weak and suffering from constant pain. He travelled to Montpellier to seek proper medical care. Nothing could be done to quell the effects of what was believed to be stomach cancer, the same disease that may have killed his son Napoleon. Buonaparte died on 24 February 1785, and, due to his frivolous spending, left his surviving wife and eight children penniless. Jérôme, his youngest son, was born three months before he died.

== Issue ==
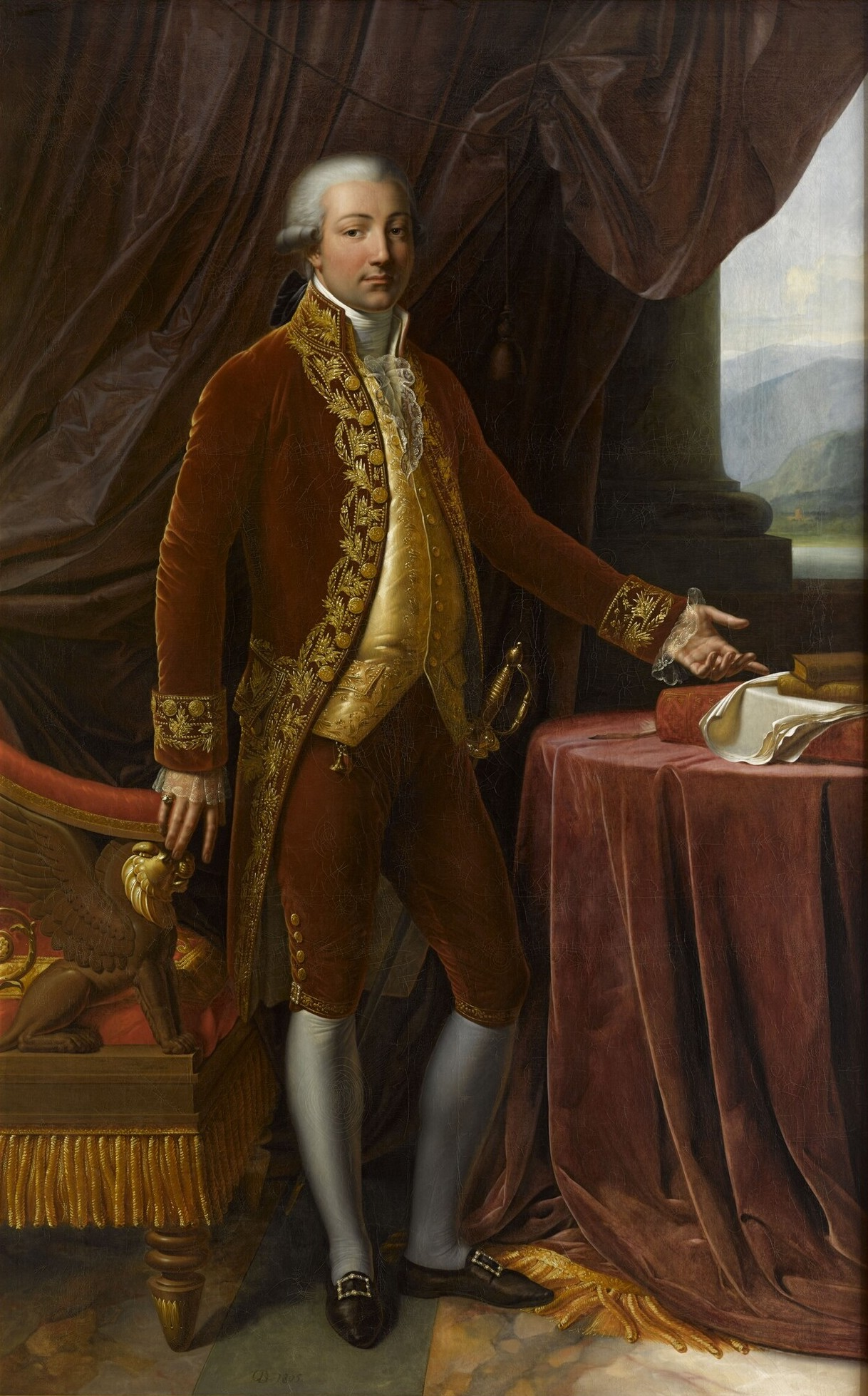
1805 portrait of Buonaparte by Girodet

Carlo Buonaparte's marriage to Letizia Ramolino produced thirteen children between 1765 and 1784; five died, two at birth and three in infancy. Eight children survived.

- Napoleone Buonaparte (born and died 17 August 1765).
- Maria Anna Buonaparte (3 January 1767 – 1 January 1768).
- Joseph Bonaparte (7 January 1768 – 28 July 1844) King of Naples, King of Spain, and Comte de Survilliers, married on 1 August 1794 Marie Julie Clary.
- Napoleon Bonaparte (15 August 1769 – 5 May 1821), Emperor of the French; married Joséphine de Beauharnais on 9 March 1796 and secondly Marie Louise, Archduchess of Austria, on 2 April 1810.
- Maria Anna Buonaparte (14 July 1771 – 23 November 1771), named after her deceased elder sister.
- A stillborn child (1773)
- Lucien Bonaparte (21 May 1775 – 29 June 1840), Prince of Canino and Musignano, married on 4 May 1794 to Christine Boyer and secondly on 26 October 1803 to Alexandrine de Bleschamp, widow of Hippolyte Jouberthon, known as "Madame Jouberthon".
- Maria Anna (Elisa) Bonaparte (3 January 1777 – 7 August 1820), named after her deceased elder sisters, Princess of Lucca and Piombino, Grand Duchess of Tuscany, and Countess of Compignano, married on 5 May 1797 Felice Pasquale Baciocchi.
- Louis Bonaparte (2 September 1778 – 25 July 1846), King of Holland, and Comte de Saint-Leu, married on 4 January 1802 Hortense de Beauharnais.
- A stillborn son (1779).
- Pauline Bonaparte (20 October 1780 – 9 June 1825), Sovereign Princess and Duchess of Guastalla, married 5 May 1797 to Victor-Emmanuel Leclerc and secondly married on 28 August 1803 Camillo Borghese, 6th Prince of Sulmona.
- Caroline Bonaparte (25 March 1782 – 18 May 1839), Grand Duchess of Berg and Cleves, wife of Joachim Murat, later queen consort of Naples, and Countess of Lipona.
- Jérôme Bonaparte (15 November 1784 – 24 June 1860), King of Westphalia, Prince of Montfort, married on 24 December 1803 to Elizabeth Patterson, secondly on 22 August 1807 to Princess Katharina of Württemberg and thirdly to Justine Bartolini-Baldelli in 1840 (religious) and 19 February 1853 (civil).

== Ancestry ==
Direct ancestors of Carlo Buonaparte

Ancestors of Carlo Buonaparte

8. Giuseppe Maria Buonaparte; (1663–1703)
4. Sebastiano Nicola Buonaparte; (1683–1720/60)
9. Maria Colonna di Bozzi; (1668–1704)
2. Giuseppe Maria Buonaparte; (1713–1763)
10. Carlo Tusoli di Bocognano; (1663–1703)
5. Maria Anna Tusoli di Bocognano; (1690–1760)
11. Isabella di Bocognano; (1668–1724)
1. Carlo Maria Buonaparte; (1746–1785)
12. Francesco Maria Paravicini; (1663–1703)
6. Giuseppe Maria Paravicini
13. Geromina Baciocchi; (1668–1724)
3. Maria Saveria Paravicini; (1715–bef. 1750)
14. Angelo Agostino Salineri; (1663–1724)
7. Maria Angela Salineri
15. Francetta Merezano; (1668–1724)
