= Justine Bartolini-Baldelli =

Italian-born French princess

- Born: Maria Giustina Melchiorra Giuseppa Leonarda Pecori-Suárez; 27 November 1811; Florence, First French Empire
- Died: 30 January 1903 (aged 91); Florence, Kingdom of Italy
- Spouse: Luigi Bartolini-Baldelli; Jérôme Bonaparte (m. 1840)
- House: Bonaparte (by marriage)

Justine Bartolini-Baldelli (née Pecori-Suárez; Italian: Giustina; 27 November 1811 in Florence, Italy – 30 January 1903 in Florence) was an Italian-born French princess, being the wife of Prince Jérôme Bonaparte, heir presumptive of France during the Second French Empire.

== Life ==
Giustina [Justine] Pecori-Suárez was the daughter of conte Bernardo Pecori-Suárez (later Pecori-Giraldi), a descendant of Florentine courtier Baldassare Suárez de la Concha, (Note: Baldassare Suárez de la Concha (1537–1620), born in Segovia, was a wealthy Spanish apothecary who was called to Florence in 1562 [with his parents ?], following Eleonora de Toledo who had become the wife of Duke Cosimo I de' Medici, then Grand Duke of Tuscany. Baldassare's father, Pietro di Ferdinando Soares/Suárez de la Concha (d. 1588), was a Coimbra-born gentleman and husband of Francesca López, of Medina del Campo, and his elder brother was the Spanish Jesuit missionary in Mexico Hernando Suárez de la Concha (1528–1608). Baldassare had a brilliant career in Florence and was ennobled as Patrizio di Firenze (Patrician of Florence) and purchased to the Corsini family the Florentine Palazzo della Commenda, the 14th century Palazzo Corsini, then Palazzo Corsini-Suarez in 1590. The Suárez de la Concha patrician family of Florence became extinct in 1799.) and Giulia Niccolini Sirigatti (dei marchesi [of the Marquesses] di Ponsacco e Camugliano). (Note: Giustina Pecori-Suárez (Bartolini-Baldelli) was also related, on her father's side, to the future Marshal of Italy Guglielmo Pecori-Giraldi.) She was first married in March 1829 to marchese Luigi Bartolini-Baldelli, who died in 1838. They had a son, who died young in 1844, and a daughter Giulia Bartolini-Baldelli, who married conte Arturo degli Alberti Mori Ubaldini [without issue ?]. Giustina's elder sister, Marianna Pecori-Suárez (b. 1810), was married in 1826 to marchese Alessandro Feroni, (Note: The only surviving child of Marianna Pecori-Suárez, Giulia Feroni, married the military officer Costantino Cerrina whose descent started the house of the marchesi Cerrina Feroni. In 1902, Costantino Cerrina obtains the addition of his wife's surname to his own, while with a diploma [dated of the 11 November 1914] he acquired the right to be awarded the marquis title, without predicate, transmissible in the male line.) with whom she had three surviving daughters named Elisa, Giulia, and Paolina; through their mother, Giustina and her sister Marianna descend from Leonardo da Vinci's model Lisa del Giocondo, the famous Mona Lisa.

In her second marriage, Giustina became the third wife of Jérôme Bonaparte, the former King of Westphalia, youngest brother of Emperor Napoleon I and widower of Princess Catharina of Württemberg. They married first in a religious ceremony in Florence in 1840, and a second time in a secret civil ceremony on 19 February 1853 in Paris, France. Her spouse was during their marriage the heir presumptive to the throne of France of his nephew Napoleon III, placing her in a position to become the next Empress of France.

At the time of her second marriage, she was a rich widow and Jerome heavily indebted, and the marriage enabled him to pay his debts and continued his luxurious lifestyle in Florence. It was a morganatic marriage upon the request of Jerome, who did not wish to recognize her officially and insisted upon calling her Madame la Marquise and have her referred to as such by others. Baron du Casse described her as beautiful, distinguished, sweet and interested in charity, but also as indolent and languid in her habits.

She followed Jerome to France in 1847, and resided with him in Paris with his son. Despite attempts to do so, she did not succeed in being officially recognized. Her stepson, Prince Napoleon, reportedly disliked her and alienated her from her spouse, who also took a mistress. Her stepson and the Corsican steward of Jerome, Pietra-Santa, accused her of an intrigue with the illegitimate son of Jerome, Jérôme David. On this occasion, Jerome did not believe the story and had Pietra-Santa fired.

In 1853, Jerome was again made Imperial Prince and heir presumptive after his nephew Napoleon III had become Emperor of the French. After this, however, he exiled Giustina back to Florence by accusing her of adultery referring to the previous mentioned story. He did, however, repay her the money she had spent on him in Florence, and purchased a palazzo by the Arno for her. In 1860, Giustina was widowed with the title of Princesse Bonaparte and awarded a pension by Napoleon III.

== Other sources ==
- Leonardo Ginori Lisci: The Florentine palazzi: their history and art, Volym 2. Giunti Barbera, 1985
- Philip Walsingham Sergeant: The burlesque Napoleon: being the story of the life and the kingship of Jerome Napoleon Bonaparte, youngest brother of Napoleon the Great (1905)
