= Letizia Bonaparte =

Mother of Napoleon I

- Madame Mère
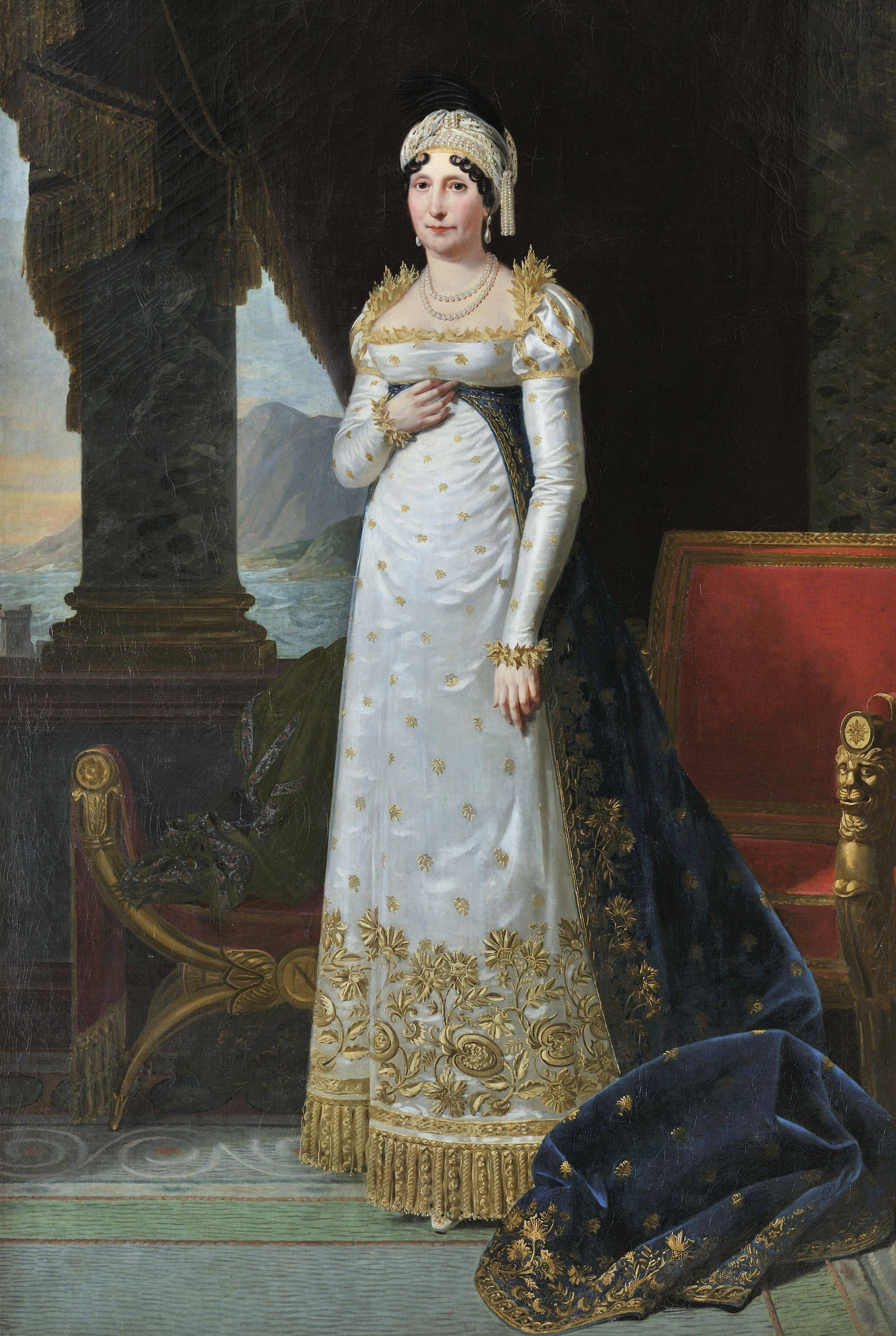
- Letizia Bonaparte (Madame Mère) by Robert Lefèvre, c. 1813
- Born: Maria-Letizia Ramolino; 24 August 1750 (or 1749 (Note: According to Jean Tulard, a note from the first volume of the Memoirs of Lucien Bonaparte indicates that she was born on 24 August 1749. This date is confirmed by the marriage record of Joseph Bonaparte and Julie Clary on 1 August 1794, which states that Madame Mère was forty-five years old at the time. Tulard notes that the date 1750, the most commonly cited, appears to be a consensus without tangible proof.)); Ajaccio, Corsica, Republic of Genoa
- Died: 2 February 1836 (aged 85 or 86); Rome, Papal States
- Burial: Imperial Chapel of Ajaccio, Corsica, France]
- Spouse: Carlo Buonaparte (m. 1764; died 1785)
- Issue Detail: Joseph, King of Spain; Napoleon I, Emperor of the French; Lucien, Prince of Canino and Musignano; Elisa, Grand Duchess of Tuscany; Louis I, King of Holland; Pauline, Princess of Guastalla; Caroline, Queen of Naples; Jérôme, King of Westphalia
- House: Bonaparte
- Father: Giovanni Geronimo Ramolino
- Mother: Angela Maria Pietrasanta

Maria-Letizia Bonaparte (née Ramolino; 24 August 1750 or 1749 – 2 February 1836), commonly known as Letizia Bonaparte, was a Corsican noblewoman and the matriarch of the House of Bonaparte, as the mother of Napoleon I, Emperor of the French. Due to her status as the Emperor's mother, she was granted the title "Madame Mère" (French for "Madame Mother").

Born in Ajaccio, Corsica, then part of the Republic of Genoa, she married Carlo Buonaparte in 1764. The couple had thirteen children, eight of whom survived to adulthood. Following her husband's death in 1785, she relocated to mainland France. Over the next decade, her son Napoleon rose rapidly through the military ranks, becoming a prominent figure during the French Revolution, then First Consul in 1799 and Emperor of the French in 1804. Throughout his ascent and reign, Letizia held a significant, though informal, position within French society. After Napoleon's abdication in 1815, she spent her later years in Rome under the protection of Pope Pius VII, living in seclusion until her death in 1836.

== Early life ==
Coat of arms of Letizia Ramolino

Maria-Letizia Ramolino was born on 24 August 1750 (or 1749) in Ajaccio, Corsica, then part of the Republic of Genoa. She was the daughter of Giovanni Geronimo Ramolino, an army officer specialising in civil engineering who commanded the Ajaccio garrison, and Angela Maria Pietra-Santa.

The Ramolino family, (Note: sometimes spelled Romolini in italian) originally from Lombardy, had been established in Corsica for approximately 250 years and was recognised as part of the Italian nobility. She was educated at home, with instruction primarily focused on domestic skills, as was customary for Corsican women of the period. Following her father's death, her mother remarried in 1757 to Franz Fesch, a Swiss officer in the Genoese navy stationed in Ajaccio. The marriage produced two children, including her half brother the future Cardinal Joseph Fesch.

== Marriage and children ==
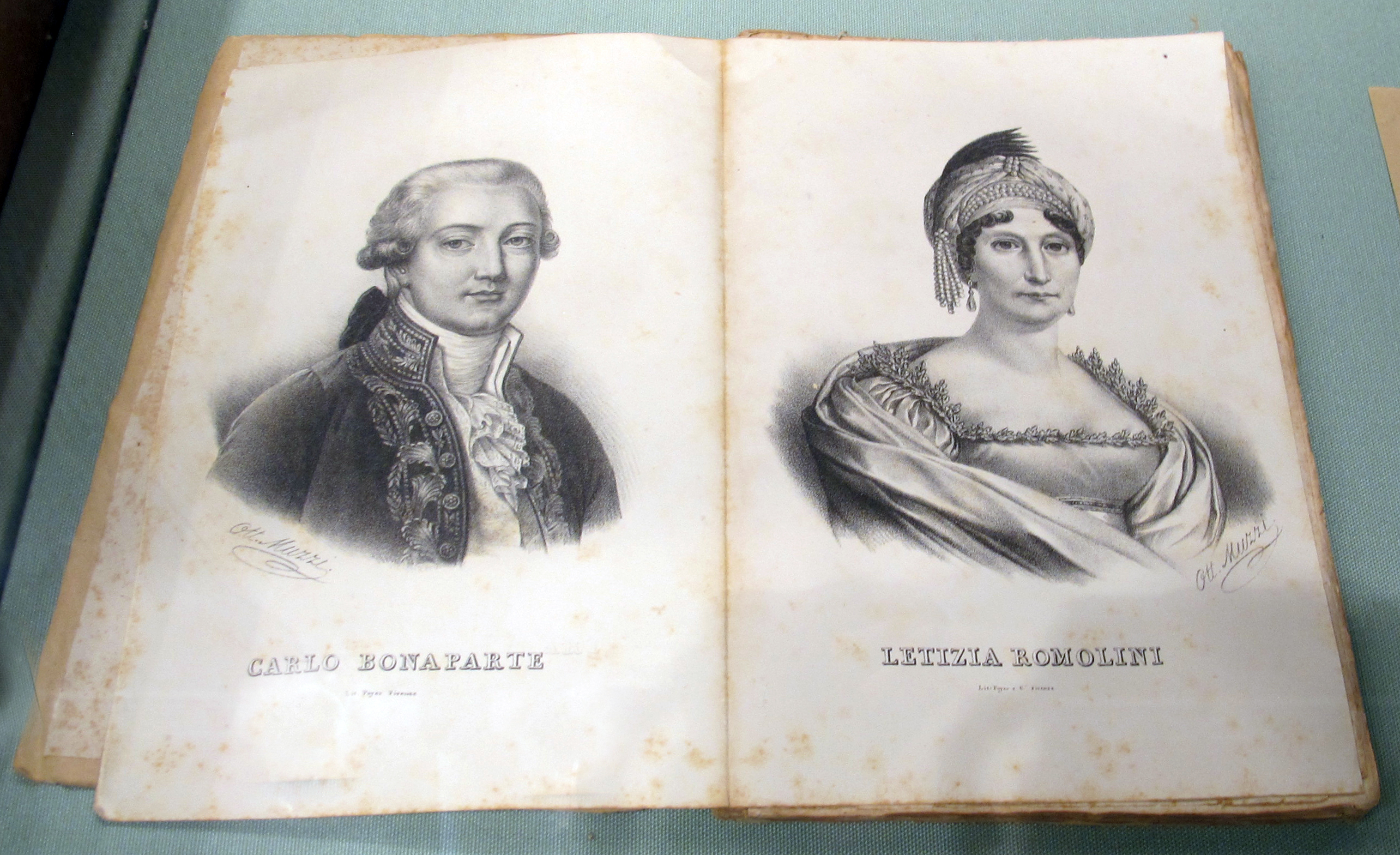
Marriage record of Letizia Ramolino and Carlo Buonaparte

On 2 June 1764, at the age of 14, Letizia married Carlo Buonaparte, an 18-year-old law student from Ajaccio. The Buonaparte family, (Note: Before the annexation of Corsica to France in 1768, the family used both spelling Bonaparte and Buonaparte After the family fled to France in 1793, they started using exclusively the French spelling of their names) part of the Corsican nobility, traced its origins to Tuscany in the early sixteenth century. Although Carlo began law studies at the University of Pisa, he abandoned them to marry Letizia.

Letizia gave birth to thirteen children, of whom eight survived. Her first son, Napoleon, was born in 1765 but died in infancy. A daughter followed but also did not survive. During this period, Carlo travelled to Rome, where he remained for two years. Upon returning to Corsica, he aligned himself with republican leader Pasquale Paoli, serving as his part-time secretary. Letizia gave birth to Joseph Bonaparte (born Giuseppe) on 7 January 1768.

Later that year, as Genoa formally ceded Corsica to France, Paoli led an armed resistance against the French administration. (Note: In November 1755, Paoli had proclaimed Corsica a sovereign republic independent from Genoa.) Letizia and her husband fled into the mountains near Corte with the rebels. While pregnant with her son Napoleon, she accompanied Carlo during the campaign. Paoli was defeated in May 1769, and the couple returned to Ajaccio.

On the Feast of the Assumption, Letizia went into labour while at Mass in Ajaccio Cathedral. According to legend, she gave birth at home on a carpet depicting scenes from the Illiad and Odyssey, though she later denied this detail. The child was named Napoleon after a deceased uncle. As Letizia was unable to nurse him, Camilla Llati was employed as a wet nurse. The family had one servant, Mammuccia Caterina, who lived with them unpaid and assisted at Napoleon's birth. Letizia ran the household while Mammuccia cared for the children.

The couple developed ties with the island's military governor Charles Réné, Comte de Marbeuf and the intendant Claude-François Bertrand de Boucheporn, whose wife became godmother to their son Louis. In 1777, Marbeuf secured Carlo's election as Corsican deputy to Versailles. In 1778, Carlo took Joseph and Napoleon to mainland France for schooling at the Collège d'Autun. The next year, after obtaining a certificate of nobility, Napoleon was admitted on scholarship to the Brienne military academy.

Letizia remained in Ajaccio and bore six more children: Lucien (1775), Elisa (1777), Louis (1778), Pauline (1780), Caroline (1782), and Jérôme (1784). She visited Napoleon at Brienne in 1784, despite restrictions on parental contact. That same year he was accepted into the École militaire in Paris, graduating a year later as second lieutenant of artillery, assigned to Valence.

== 1785–1804 ==
On 24 February 1785, Letizia Bonaparte was widowed at the age of 35 when her husband, Carlo, died of stomach cancer, leaving her with eight surviving children. Her eldest son, Joseph, returned to Corsica from the Collège d'Autun to assume responsibility as head of the family. In September 1786, Napoleon also returned to Ajaccio after eight years away, then serving as a lieutenant in the Royal Army. The family's financial situation deteriorated, forcing Letizia to provide for her younger children while struggling to fund Joseph and Napoleon's education. Napoleon returned home in early 1788, remaining until June to assist her as the household's main provider. By late 1789, he had returned again and, alongside Joseph, became involved in Corsican politics.

In 1793, after Napoleon broke with Pasquale Paoli, Letizia and her children fled Corsica on 31 May as Paolist forces looted and burned their home. The family resettled in Toulon during the height of the Reign of Terror. To avoid suspicion as aristocrats, Letizia and her daughters were listed as "dressmakers" on passports issued by Napoleon. When the Royal Navy took Toulon a month later, the family moved to Marseilles, where Letizia, now destitute, relied on soup kitchens and Napoleon's officer's salary.

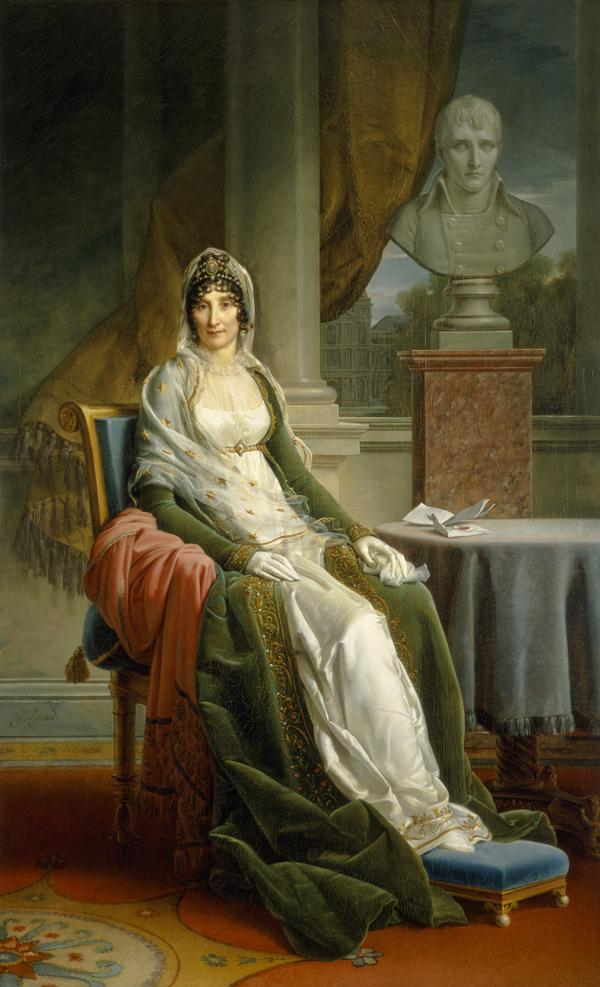
Letizia Bonaparte, seated in a Parisian apartment with a bust of Napoleon as First Consul, by François Gérard, 1802–1803

In the spring of 1794, following Napoleon's first major victory at the siege of Toulon, his promotion to général de brigade improved the family's circumstances. He moved Letizia and her children to the Château Salé in Antibes. Although she took pride in his success, she disapproved of his marriage to Joséphine de Beauharnais, which took place on 9 March 1796 without her knowledge or consent. When Joseph was appointed ambassador to the Holy See in May 1796, Letizia accompanied him to Italy. After Napoleon's victories in the Italian campaign, she visited him in Milan on 1 June 1797 with Caroline and Jérôme. She later returned to Ajaccio and moved back into Casa Buonaparte, which had been rebuilt in her absence. Napoleon entrusted both Letizia and Cardinal Fesch with influence over Corsican appointments, instructing the prefect not to act without consulting them.

On 28 September 1799, Napoleon visited Letizia in Ajaccio following his return from the Egyptian campaign. He departed for Fréjus on 7 October and carried out the Coup of 18 Brumaire, seizing power as First Consul. Letizia relocated to Paris, where she adopted a modest lifestyle despite now being mother to the head of state. She was granted a pension of 25,000 francs per month.

On the evening of 10 November 1799, while attending the theatre with her daughters, the performance was interrupted by news of an attempted assassination of Napoleon. Letizia remained composed and did not leave until the play ended. In 1803, a rift emerged within the family when Lucien Bonaparte married Alexandrine de Bleschamp against Napoleon's wishes. Letizia supported Lucien and soon left Paris for Rome, where she joined Pauline, now Princess Borghese, and lived with Cardinal Fesch. Lucien and his family joined them soon after.

== Mother of the Emperor ==
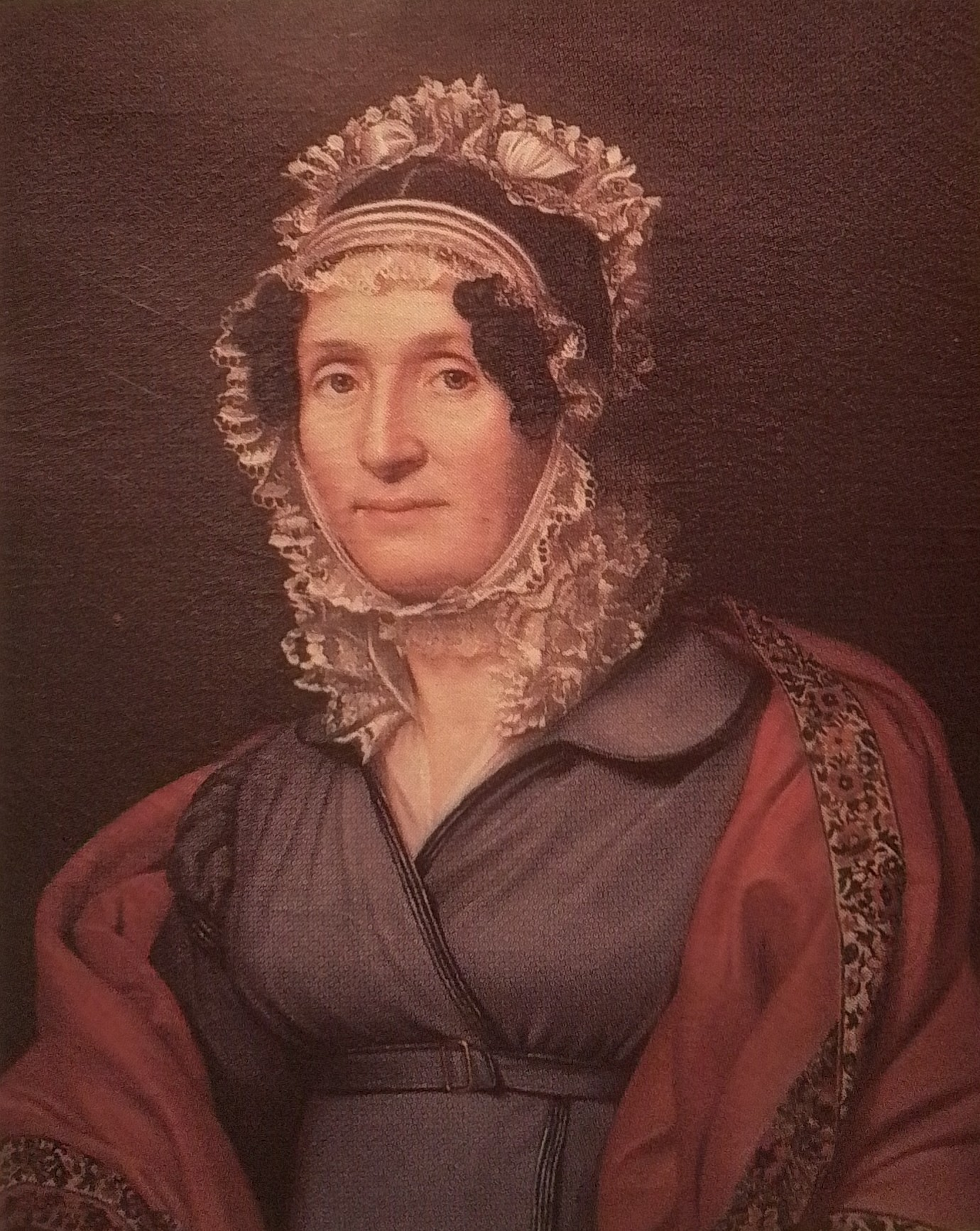
Portrait of Letizia Bonaparte by Joseph Karl Stieler, 1811

While Napoleon had granted his siblings the style of Imperial Highness, except Lucien and Jérôme, Letizia initially held no formal title. In July 1804, Cardinal Fesch wrote to Napoleon proposing that she be granted one. By imperial decree, she received the title Madame, traditionally used for daughters of the king. To distinguish her status, the designation "Mother of His Majesty the Emperor" was added. From then on, she was referred to as Madame Mère ("Madame Mother").

On 2 December 1804, when Napoleon was crowned Emperor, Letizia did not attend the coronation ceremony, though she appears in Jacques-Louis David's famous painting, The Coronation of Napoleon. When congratulated on her son's success, she is said to have replied, « Pourvu que ça dure ! » ("Let's hope it lasts!").

On 19 December 1804, Letizia left Rome and settled at the Hôtel de Brienne in Paris, a residence she purchased from Lucien for 600,000 francs. In addition, Napoleon granted her an appanage of 500,000 francs annually. Despite her son's rise, she remained distant from the Imperial court. From 1805 to 1813, she lived primarily at the Château de Pont-sur-Seine, a country estate gifted by Napoleon. During her occasional visits to Paris, she stayed at the Hôtel de Brienne.

== Later life and death ==
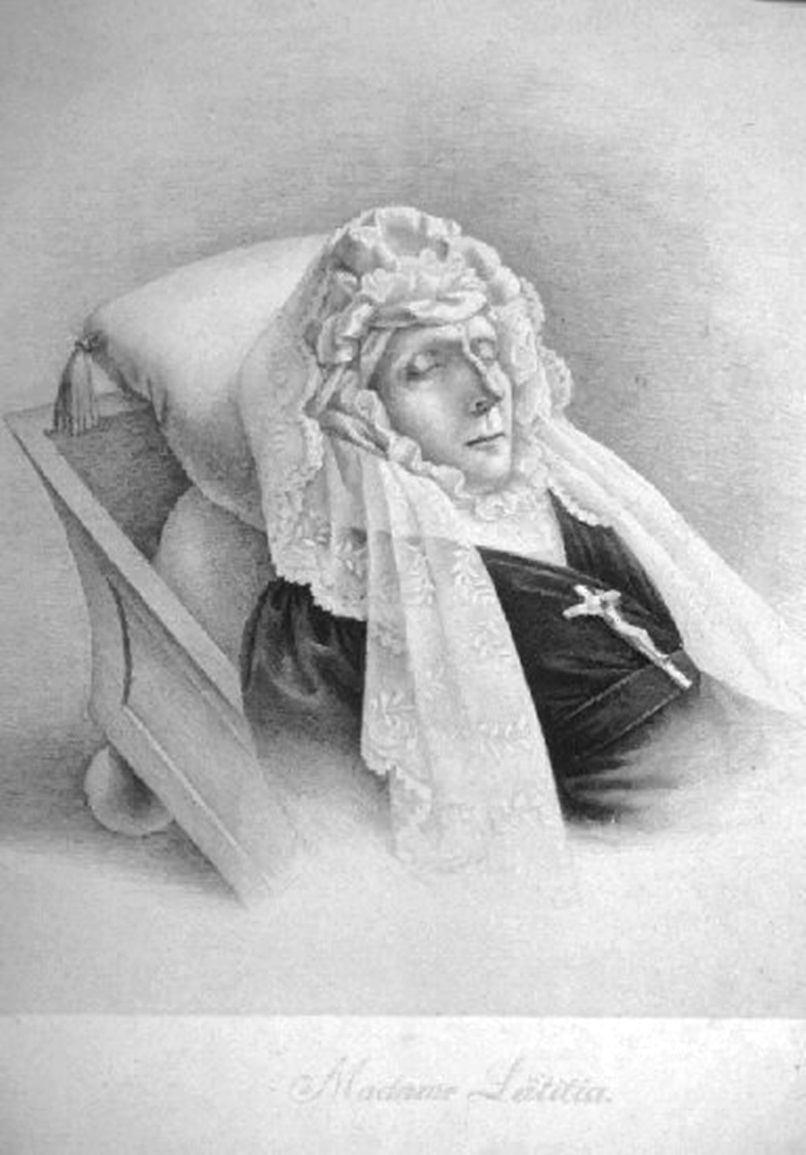
Deathbed portrait of Letizia Bonaparte

In 1814, Letizia Bonaparte accompanied Napoleon into exile on Elba, where she lived alongside Pauline. In February 1815, she returned with him to Paris during the Hundred Days. Their final meeting took place at the Château de Malmaison on 29 June 1815. After bidding him farewell, Letizia left the capital and travelled to Rome under the protection of Pope Pius VII. There, she purchased the former Palazzo Rinuccini, later renamed Palazzo Bonaparte, on the corner of Piazza Venezia and Via del Corso. She took up residence with her son Joseph Bonaparte.

Letizia spent her final years in seclusion, receiving few visitors apart from her half-brother, Cardinal Fesch, who remained with her. She lived comfortably on wealth amassed through careful investment and the sale of jewellery. For a time, she was accompanied by the painter Anna Barbara Bansi.

Letizia Bonaparte died in 1836, aged 85, three weeks before the 51st anniversary of her husband's death. Nearly blind, she had outlived Napoleon by fifteen years. In 1851, her remains were transferred to the Imperial Chapel of Ajaccio, which had been built for her. A century later, in 1951, the body of Carlo Buonaparte was also moved there to rest beside her.

== Issue ==
Letizia Bonaparte gave birth to thirteen children between 1765 and 1784.

- Napoleone Buonaparte (17 August 1765), died shortly after birth
- Maria Anna Buonaparte (3 January 1767 – 1 January 1768)
- Joseph Bonaparte (7 January 1768 – 28 July 1844), King of Naples (1806–1808) and King of Spain (1808–1813); married Julie Clary on 1 August 1794
- Napoleon Bonaparte (15 August 1769 – 5 May 1821), Emperor of the French (1804–1814, 1815); married Joséphine de Beauharnais in 1796 (annulled 1810), then Marie Louise of Austria on 1 April 1810
- Maria Anna Buonaparte (14 July 1771 – 23 November 1771)
- Stillborn child (1773)
- Lucien Bonaparte (21 March 1775 – 29 June 1840), Prince of Canino and Musignano; married Christine Boyer on 4 May 1794, then Alexandrine de Bleschamp on 26 October 1803
- Elisa Bonaparte (3 January 1777 – 7 August 1820), Grand Duchess of Tuscany (1805–1809); married Felice Pasquale Baciocchi on 5 May 1797
- Louis Bonaparte (2 September 1778 – 25 July 1846), King of Holland (1806–1810); married Hortense de Beauharnais on 4 January 1802
- Stillborn son (1779)
- Pauline Bonaparte (20 October 1780 – 9 June 1825), Duchess of Guastalla; married General Charles Leclerc on 14 June 1797 (died 1802), then Prince Camillo Borghese on 28 August 1803
- Caroline Bonaparte (25 March 1782 – 18 May 1839), Queen of Naples (1808–1815); married Joachim Murat in 1800
- Jérôme Bonaparte (15 November 1784 – 24 June 1860), King of Westphalia (1807–1813), later Prince of Montfort; married Elizabeth Patterson Bonaparte on 24 December 1803 (annulled 1806), then Catharina of Württemberg on 22 August 1807, and Justine Bartolini-Baldelli in 1840 (religious) and 19 February 1853 (civil)

== Cultural depictions ==
Letizia Bonaparte has been portrayed in several film and television productions. Dame May Whitty was the first to depict her onscreen, in the 1937 historical drama Conquest. She was later portrayed by Jane Lapotaire in the 1987 American miniseries Napoleon and Josephine: A Love Story, and by Anouk Aimée in the 2002 French-Canadian production Napoléon. Most recently, Sinéad Cusack played her in Ridley Scott's 2023 film Napoleon.

== Arms ==
Coat of arms of Letizia Bonaparte
Notes The coat of arms of Letizia Bonaparte features an eagle, head turned sinister, on an azure field, standing upon golden thunderbolts. Above the eagle is the letter "L", representing her initial. The shield is encircled by a red imperial mantle semé of bees and topped with the imperial crown.
