= Nobile (aristocracy) =

Italian title of nobility

Coronet of an Italian noble

Nobile ([ˈnɔːbile], abbreviated Nob.) is an Italian hereditary title borne by a noble who ranks similarly or just below a baron, similar to the rank of Baronet in England, Fidalgo in Portugal or Ritter in Germany. Unlike higher Italian titles which are typically referred to in lieu of an individual's name, nobile is used immediately before the given and surnames, usually in the abbreviated form Nob..

The word “nobile” is derived from the Latin “nobilis”, meaning "honourable". It is often abbreviated to "N.H." (Nobilis Homo) for men or "N.D." (Nobilis Domina) for women, just prior to the first name, and such noblemen are styled "Your/His Lordship".

The heraldic coronet of a nobile consists of a jewelled circlet of gold surmounted by eight pearls (five visible), either on stems or set directly upon the rim. The armorial shield of a nobile is surmounted by a silver helm displayed in a ¾ side-view and surmounted by the coronet already described. It is typically displayed above the shield in the full heraldic achievement associated with a noble's specific title.

== History ==
The rank of nobile had existed for centuries, used to denote either titled nobles (e.g., baron, count) or their cadets. In this connection, however, by 1800 many signori (lords of the manor) in Sicily and vassals in Piedmont were recognised as barons, whereas formerly they would have been simple nobili. The most famous holder of such a title was Nobile Giuseppe Maria Buonaparte, grandfather of Napoléon.

Prior to the creation of the Kingdom of Italy, the Heraldic Court of Milan (the legal body empowered to decide on matters regarding titles of nobility) awarded and registered the term nobile as a title of nobility, until Napoléon's army overran the Austrian Habsburg-controlled Duchy of Milan in 1796. When such a title was granted, the coat of arms of the new “nobile” was entered into the Book of Coat of Arms of Maria Teresa of Austria (subsequently kept at the State Archives of Milan {ASMi}), along with a painting of the arms concerned. The records of such grants and the depictions of their corresponding arms show that, at that period, the title of nobile did not include a corresponding coronet of rank.

Following the creation and formal proclamation of the Kingdom of Italy in 1861, the existing Consulta Araldica, thenceforth denoted as the Italian Heraldic College, recorded nobile as the lowest rank in the hierarchy of Italian titles of nobility (but compare cavaliere ereditario, patrizio and coscritto). The nobile title was transmitted to not-firstborn sons of nobles, whose main title was transmitted by firstborn rule (article 20 of Consulta Araldica's regulation).

== Law ==
The Italian Republic does not recognise titles of nobility. The Italian Constitution of 1948 abolished the Consulta Araldica, and with it any official registry of titles of nobility.

== Bibliography ==
- E. Genta, "Titoli nobiliari", in AA.VV., Enciclopedia del diritto, Varese 1992, vol. XLIV, pag. 674-684.
- Regolamento della Consulta araldica, approvato con regio decreto del 8 maggio 1870.
- Enciclopedia Storico-Nobiliare Italiana, MCMXXVIII - ANNO VII
- Archivio di Stato di Milano
- Burke's Peerage, Baronetage and Knightage of the UK.- 1914 ed.
