= Jérôme Bonaparte =

King of Westphalia from 1807 to 1813

Jérôme Napoleon I
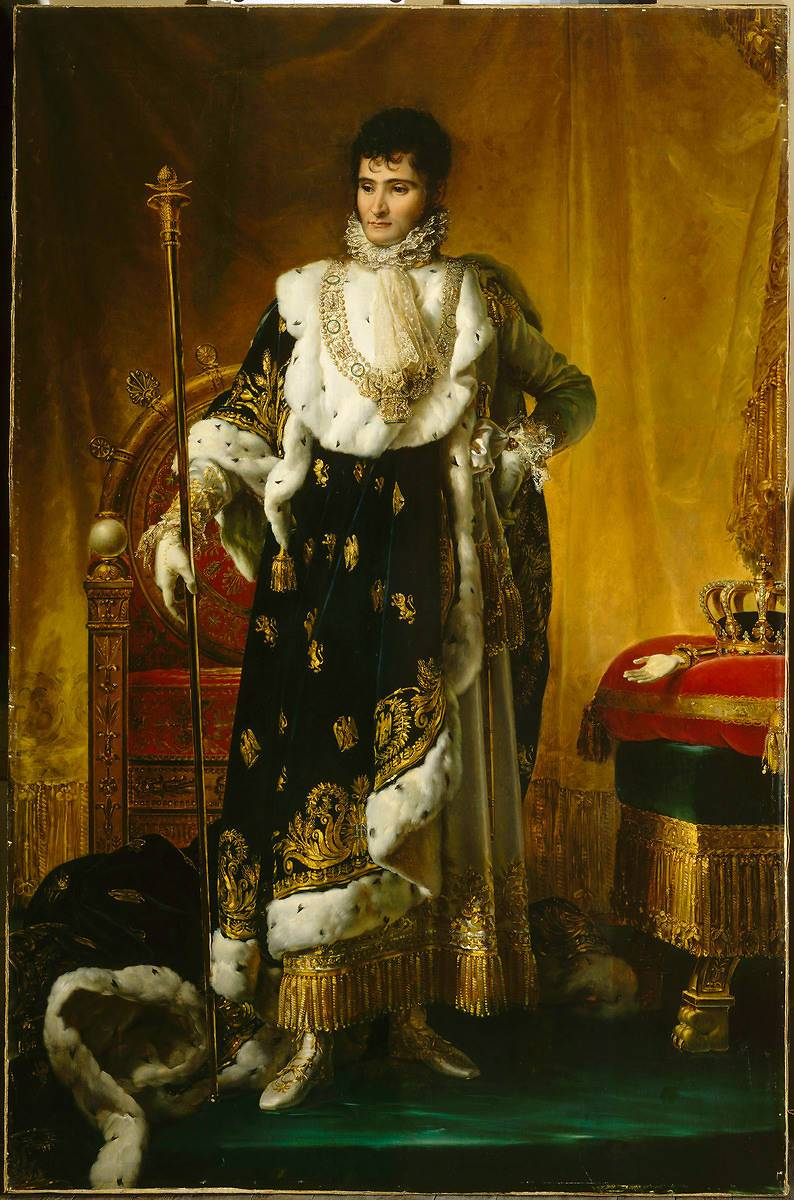
- Portrait of Jérôme Bonaparte by François Gérard, 1811

King of Westphalia
- Reign: 7 July 1807 – 26 October 1813
- First Minister: Joseph Jérôme Siméon

Prince of Montfort
- Tenure: 31 July 1816 – 24 June 1860
- Successor: Napoléon Jérôme

President of the French Senate
- In office 28 January 1852 – 30 November 1852
- Predecessor: Étienne-Denis Pasquier (Chamber of Peers)
- Successor: Raymond-Theodore Troplong
- Born: 15 November 1784; Ajaccio, Corsica, Kingdom of France
- Died: 24 June 1860 (aged 75); Vilgénis, Seine-et-Oise, France
- Burial: Les Invalides, Paris
- Spouse: Elizabeth Patterson (m. 1803; ann. 1805) Catharina of Württemberg (m. 1807; died 1835) Giustina Pecori-Suárez (m. 1840)
- Issue: Jérôme Napoléon Bonaparte; Jérôme Napoléon Charles Bonaparte; Mathilde, Princess of San Donato; Napoléon Jérôme, Prince Napoléon
- House: Bonaparte
- Father: Carlo Buonaparte
- Mother: Letizia Ramolino

Jérôme Bonaparte (born Girolamo Buonaparte; 15 November 1784 – 24 June 1860) was the youngest brother of Napoleon I who reigned as Jérôme Napoleon I (formally Hieronymus Napoleon in German), King of Westphalia, between 1807 and 1813.

From 1816 onward, he bore the title of Prince of Montfort. After 1848, when his nephew, Louis Napoleon, became President of the Second French Republic, he served in several official roles, including Marshal of France from 1850 onward, and President of the Senate in 1852. He was the only one of Napoleon's siblings who was able to eventually return to France after the forced exile of the Bonaparte family in 1815.

Historian Owen Connelly points to his financial, military, and administrative successes and concludes he was a loyal, useful, and soldierly asset to Napoleon. Others, including historian Helen Jean Burn, have demonstrated his military failures, including a dismal career in the French navy that nearly escalated into war with Britain over an incident in the West Indies, and his selfish concerns that led to the deaths of tens of thousands during the French invasion of Russia when he failed to provide military support as Napoleon had counted upon for his campaign. Further, Jérôme's addiction to spending led to both personal and national financial disasters, with his large personal debts repeatedly paid by family members, including Napoleon, his mother, and both of his first two fathers-in-law. The treasury of Westphalia was emptied. In general, most historians agree that he was the most unsuccessful of Napoleon's brothers.

== Early life ==
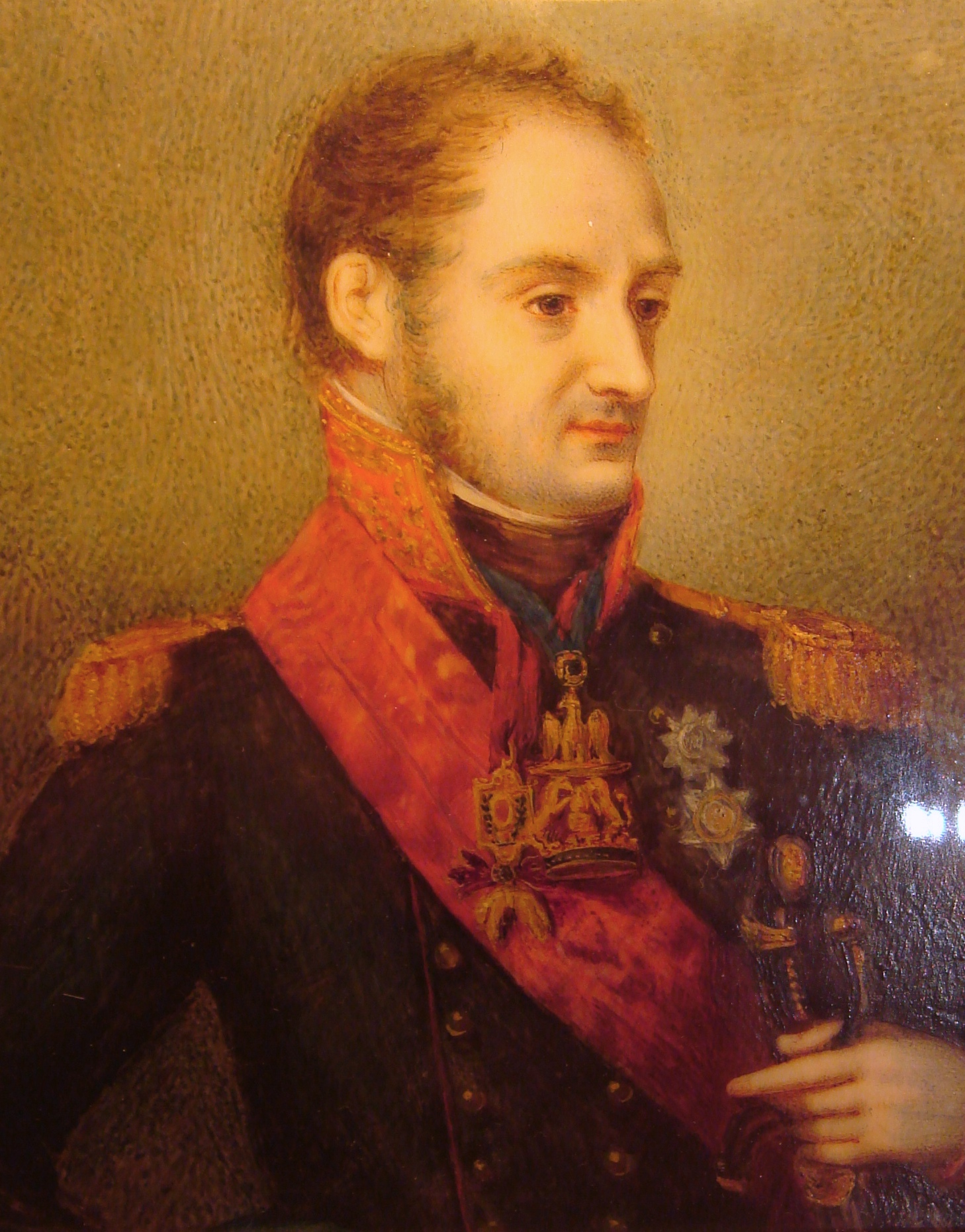
Early 19th century enamel with a portrait of Jérôme Bonaparte

Jérôme was born in Ajaccio, Corsica, the eighth and last surviving child (and fifth surviving son) of Carlo Buonaparte and his wife, Letizia Ramolino. His elder siblings were: Joseph Bonaparte, Napoleon Bonaparte, Lucien Bonaparte, Elisa Bonaparte, Louis Bonaparte, Pauline Bonaparte, and Caroline Bonaparte.

He studied at the Catholic College of Juilly and Lay College at the Irish College in Paris, and then joined the French Navy in January 1800. Napoleon put him in charge of a French frigate in the West Indies. Fleeing from an incident in which he accidentally fired on a British ship and thus could have escalated conflict between the two countries, and fearing his brother's wrath, he fled north under the assumed name of "Mr. Albert" to the United States, where he planned to remain until his brother's temper cooled. While there, he amassed considerable debts and was nearly in a duel due to ruining at least one lady's honour. Upon the boast by an old naval friend that Baltimore had the most beautiful women in the U.S., he made his way to that city (July 1803), where he met Elizabeth Patterson, reportedly the most beautiful woman in Baltimore. On Christmas Eve, 24 December 1803, nineteen-year-old Jérôme married Elizabeth Patterson (1785–1879), who herself was only eighteen. The wedding took place against the bride's father's wishes; William Patterson had received an anonymous letter beforehand which detailed Jérôme's womanizing, his massive debts, and his plans to use the marriage only as a way to stay in style in the U.S. until he could return to his family in France.

Jérôme's elder brother Napoleon was furious about the match - he wanted to marry his siblings into royal families across Europe and to expand the Bonaparte dynasty through marriage. He was unable to convince Pope Pius VII in Rome to annul the marriage, and so after becoming Emperor in 1804, he annulled the marriage himself (by a French imperial decree, on 11 March 1805), as a matter of state. At the time, Jérôme was on his way to Europe with Elizabeth, who was then pregnant. They landed in neutral Portugal, and Jérôme set off to Italy to persuade his brother to recognize the marriage. Elizabeth tried to land in Amsterdam, hoping to enter France so her baby would be born on French soil, but the Emperor barred the ship from entering the harbour. Elizabeth sailed to England instead, and gave birth to her child, Jérôme Napoléon Bonaparte (1805–1870), in London. Jérôme would not attempt to see his son for two decades.

The Emperor followed up his decree of divorce with Roman Catholic and (later) French state divorce proceedings. Jérôme submitted to the Emperor's demands and ended his marriage; in return, he was made an admiral in the French Navy (commanding the Genoa Squadron from May 1805), a general in the army, King of Westphalia (r. 1807–1813), and an imperial prince, and Napoleon arranged marriage for him to a princess. Elizabeth returned alone to America with her son; she never spoke to Jérôme again. Fearing losing control of her son and her finances to Jérôme, Elizabeth was later declared divorced from Jérôme by a special decree and act of the Maryland General Assembly in 1815.

== King of Westphalia ==
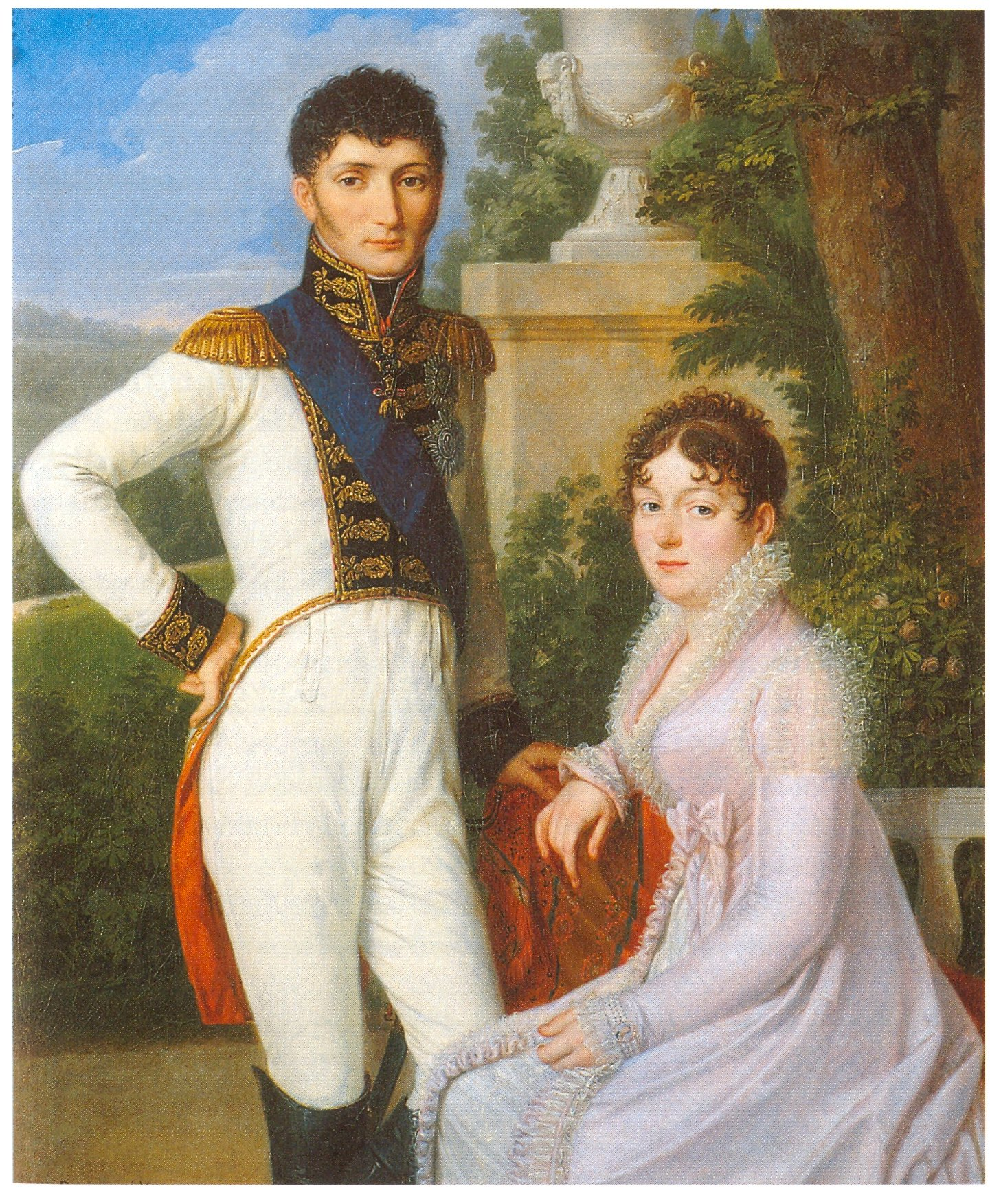
Jérôme Bonaparte, King of Westphalia, and Queen Catharina

Napoleon made his brother King of Westphalia, a short-lived realm (1807–13) created from several states and principalities in northwestern Germany that had been in the Holy Roman Empire and were now incorporated by Napoleon into the Confederation of the Rhine.

The Napoleonic realm of Westphalia had its capital in Kassel (then: Cassel). Jérôme was married, as arranged by Napoleon before he was divorced from Elizabeth, to Princess Catharina of Württemberg, the daughter of Frederick I, King of Württemberg. A marriage to a German princess was intended to boost the dynastic standing of the young French king.

When Jérôme and Catharina arrived in Kassel, they found the palaces in a plundered state. As such, they placed orders for an array of stately furniture and expensive silverware with leading Parisian manufacturers. Local artisans, eager for commissions, oriented themselves with these French models. The king also intended to refurbish his capital architecturally, and the court theatre ranks among the small number of projects realised. Jérôme had it designed by Leo von Klenze and constructed next to the summer residence, previously known as "Wilhelmshöhe", which was changed to "Napoleonshöhe". To emphasize his rank as a ruler, and pander to his own ego, Jérôme commissioned grandiose state portraits of himself and his spouse, Queen Catharina. Other paintings were to celebrate his military exploits, with many of France's most prominent painters taken into his employ. His careless spending continued and stripped the treasury of its funds, putting the new kingdom into debt. This reckless disregard for finances would continue for the rest of his life.

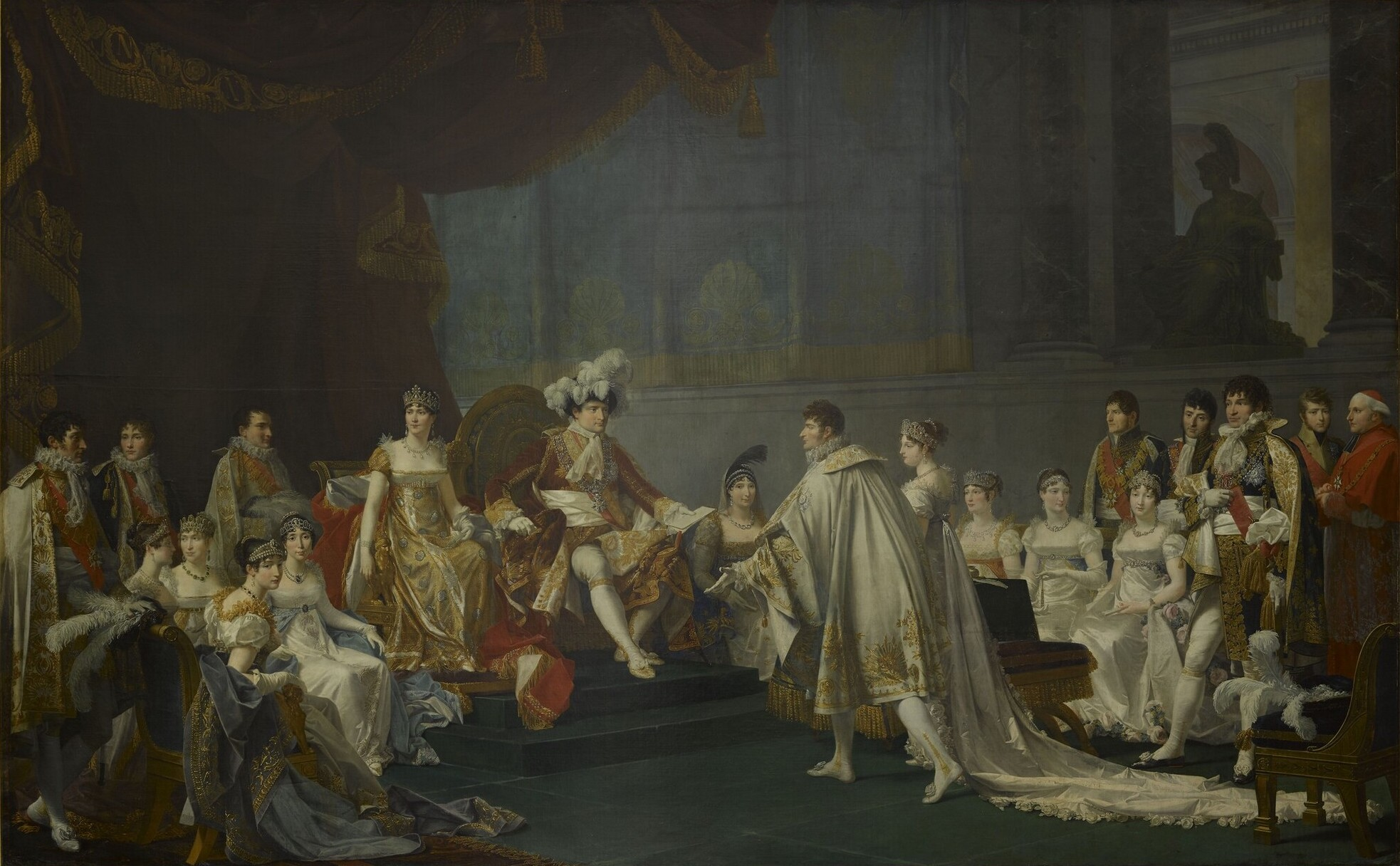
Jérôme Bonaparte and Princess Catharina of Württemberg standing before Napoleon on 22 August 1807

As a model state, the Kingdom of Westphalia was expected by Napoleon to serve as an example for the other German states. It received the first constitution and parliament to be found on German soil (decades before other parliaments, legislatures, reichstags, bundesrats, etc. such as in Frankfurt in 1848). Jérôme imported the Empire style from Paris, bestowing the new state with a modern, representative appearance. The small kingdom thus received more attention since the famous Treaty of Westphalia, which ended the Thirty Years' War a hundred and sixty years earlier in 1648. Thanks to these efforts by King Jerome, Kassel celebrated an enormous cultural upturn.

However, Jérôme's expensive habits earned him the contempt of Napoleon and bankrupted his kingdom. His court incurred expenses comparable to Napoleon's court (which oversaw a vastly larger and more important realm), and Napoleon refused to support Jérôme financially.

In 1812, Jérôme was given command of a corps in the Grande Armée, marching towards Minsk. Jérôme Insisted on travelling "in state". Napoleon reprimanded Jerome for this, ordering him to leave his court and luxurious trappings behind. After the Battle of Mir (1812), Jérome occupied Mir Castle. In pique at Napoleon's order, Jérôme returned with his entire court and train to Westphalia. As a result, tens of thousands of lives were most likely lost during the invasion of Russia. After the defeat in Russia during the following winter, Jerome petitioned Napoleon to allow his wife to go to Paris, fearing the advance of the Allied armies. On the second attempt, Napoleon granted permission.

Jérôme briefly re-entered the army in 1813, when his kingdom was being threatened from the east by the advancing allied Prussian and Russian armies during the German campaign of 1813. He led a small force to challenge their attempt at liberation. Following a clash with an enemy detachment, he made camp with his army, hoping for reinforcements from the French army in the west. However, before reinforcements arrived, the main allied force liberated the capital, Kassel. The Kingdom of Westphalia was declared dissolved, and Jérôme's kingship ended. He then fled to join his wife, the former queen, in France. After Napoleon's final defeat in 1815 during the War of the Seventh Coalition, the Allies would reorganize the former Westphalian territories along with the rest of the German states into a German Confederation with Austrian leadership.

== The Hundred Days ==
During the Hundred Days, Napoleon placed Jérôme in command of the 6th Division of the II Corps under General Honoré Charles Reille. At Waterloo, Jérôme's division was to make an initial attack on Hougoumont. It is said that Napoleon wished to draw in the Duke of Wellington's reserves. Whatever the intent, Jérôme was allowed to enlarge the assault such that his division became completely engaged attempting to take Hougoumont to the exclusion of any other possible deployment, without significantly weakening Wellington's centre. The episode became another in the long line of his military failures.

== Later years ==
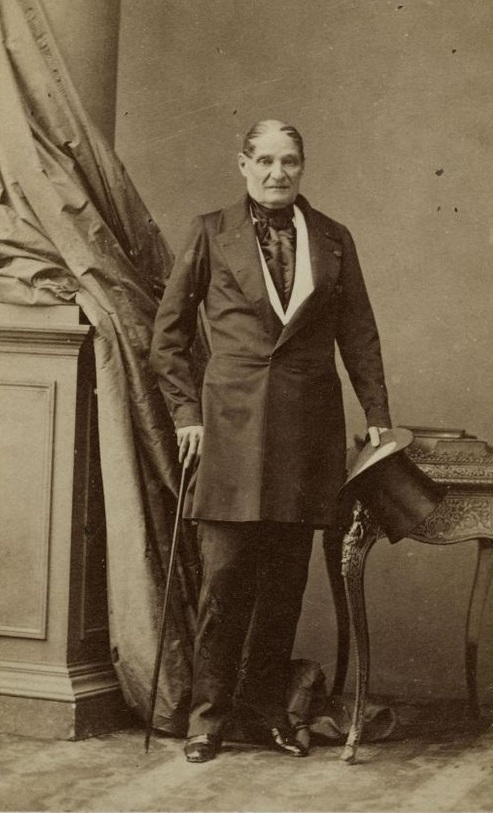
Bonaparte photographed in the 1850s by Disdéri

Although Catharina was aware of Jérôme's womanizing and many affairs, she remained true to her husband. They had two sons, Prince Jérôme Napoléon Charles Bonaparte (1814–1847) and Prince Napoléon Bonaparte (1822–1891), also known as "Prince Napoleon" or "Plon-Plon". Their second child was a daughter, Princess Mathilde Bonaparte, who was a prominent hostess during and after the Second French Empire of Napoleon III (1852–70).

After the dissolution of his kingdom, Jérôme was given the title of "Prince of Montfort" (French: prince de Montfort) by his father-in-law, King Frederick I of Württemberg, in July 1816. Previously, King Frederick had forced Jérôme and his wife to leave the country in 1814. During their exile, they visited the United States (his second time there). Jérôme later returned to France and joined Napoleon during an attempt to restore the Empire during the "Hundred Days".

Later, Jérôme moved to Italy, where he married his third wife, Giustina Pecori-Suárez. She was the widow of an Italian Marquess, Luigi Bartolini-Baldelli and his mistress during his second marriage.

In 1848, his nephew, Prince Louis Napoleon, became President of the French Second Republic. Jérôme was made Governor of Les Invalides in Paris, which was the burial place of Napoleon I--a position which provided a large salary for little work due to his debts and his complete lack of success at previous leadership endeavours. When Louis Napoleon became emperor as Napoleon III, Jérôme was recognized as the heir presumptive to the re-established imperial throne until the birth of Napoléon Eugène, Prince Imperial. Jérôme was named a Marshal of France in 1850, served as President of the Senate (the upper house in the French Republic's parliament, compared with the lower house of the National Assembly) in 1852, and received the title of "Prince Français".

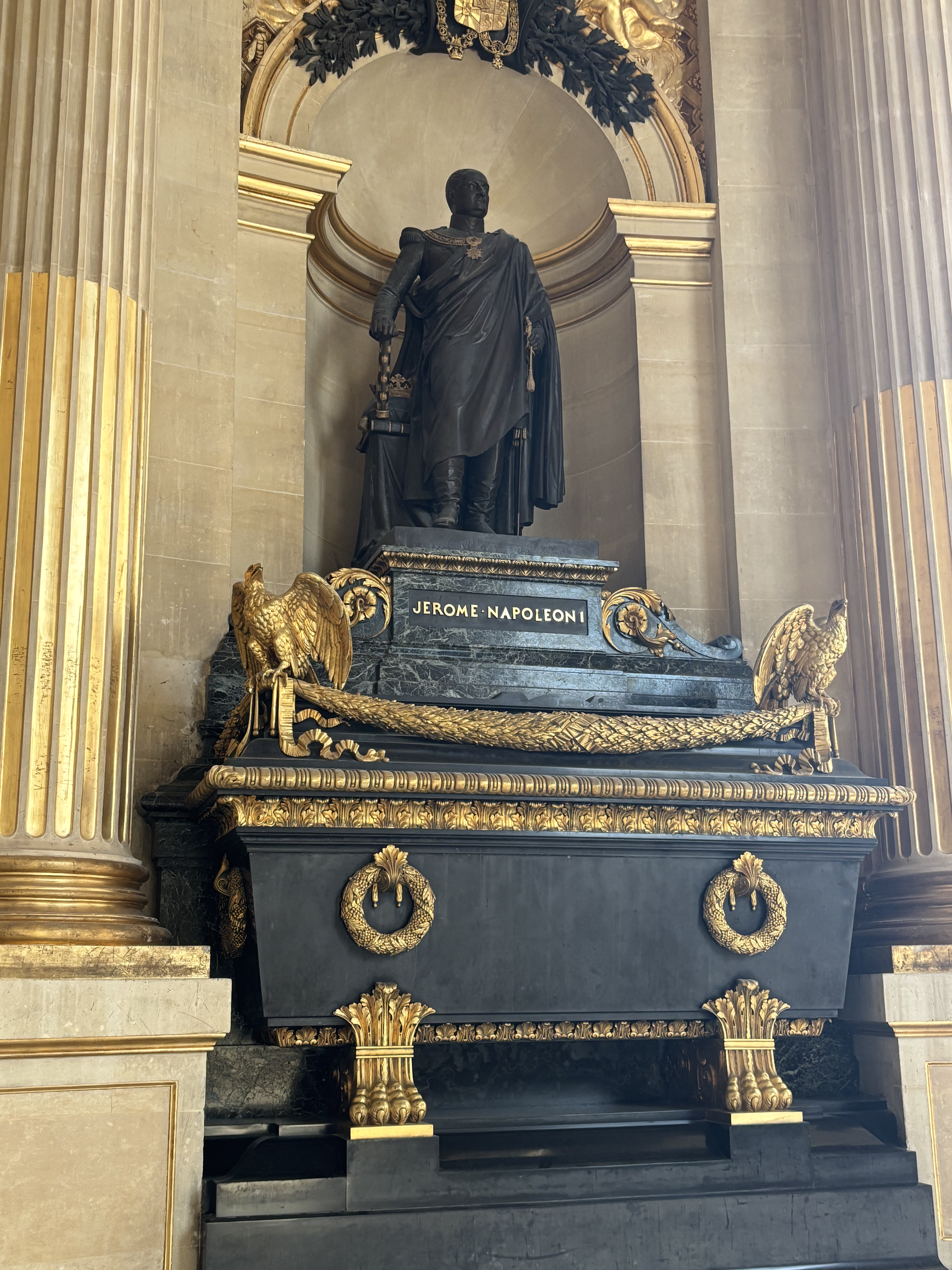
Tomb of Jérôme Bonaparte at Les Invalides

Jérôme Bonaparte died on 24 June 1860, at Villegenis, France (today known as Massy in Essonne). He is buried in Les Invalides.

His grandson, Charles Joseph Bonaparte (son of Jerome "Bo" Napoleon Bonaparte, 1805–1870), served as United States Secretary of the Navy and United States Attorney General in President Theodore Roosevelt's administration, 1901–1909, and addressed the Supreme Court over 500 times. In 1908, he established a Bureau of Investigation within the 38-year-old Department of Justice. The bureau grew under director J. Edgar Hoover and was renamed the Federal Bureau of Investigation (F.B.I) in 1935.

Another grandson was Jerome Napoleon Bonaparte II, (1829–1893). In the early 1850s, he graduated from the United States Military Academy at West Point, was commissioned an officer in the United States Army, and served with the Mounted Rifles in Texas on the American southwestern frontier. He eventually resigned his commission and joined the forces of his cousin, the Emperor Napoleon III in his Second French Empire.

Among Jérôme Bonaparte's illegitimate children was Baroness Jenny von Gustedt, born as Jeromée Catharina Rabe von Pappenheim (1811–1890). She became the grandmother of the German Socialist and Feminist writer Lily Braun.

== In fiction and popular culture ==
The 1923 German comedy film The Little Napoleon is loosely based around his life. He is played by Paul Heidemann.

The 1928 part-talkie Vitaphone film "Glorious Betsy" provides a semi-historical narrative depicting the courtship, marriage, and forced breakup of Jérôme Bonaparte (played by Conrad Nagel) and Elizabeth "Betsy" Patterson (played by Dolores Costello).

In the Hornblower television series, he was portrayed by British actor David Birkin. The last episode (Duty) introduces Jérôme and Elizabeth ('Betsy'). Adrift in an open boat, they are picked up by Captain Hornblower's ship; Jérôme poses as a harmless Swiss citizen, but Hornblower identifies him. After many diplomatic manoeuvres, the British government decides that Jérôme is of no political importance after all, and he is allowed to return to France while Elizabeth is put aboard a passing American ship.

Jerome and Betsy's marriage is portrayed in the historical novel "The Ambitious Madame Bonaparte" by Ruth Hull Chatlien, published in 2013.

In the 1936 film Hearts Divided, Jerome was portrayed by Dick Powell. Elizabeth Patterson was played by Marion Davies, with Claude Rains as Napoleon.

== Family ==
Descendants of Jérôme Bonaparte and Elizabeth Patterson

- Jérôme Napoléon Bonaparte (1805–1870)
  - Jerome Napoleon Bonaparte II (1830–1893)
    - Louise-Eugénie Bonaparte (1873–1923)
    - Jerome Napoleon Charles Bonaparte (1878–1945)
  - Charles Joseph Bonaparte (1851–1921)

Descendants of Jérôme Bonaparte and Catharina of Württemberg

- Jérôme Napoléon Charles Bonaparte (1814–1847)
- Mathilde Bonaparte (1820–1904), married Anatole Demidoff, 1st Prince of San Donato
- Napoléon-Jérôme Bonaparte (1822–1891), married Princess Maria Clotilde of Savoy
  - Napoléon Victor Bonaparte (1862–1926), married Princess Clémentine of Belgium
    - Clotilde Bonaparte (1912–1996), married Count Serge de Witt
    - Louis Bonaparte (1914–1997), married Alix de Foresta
      - Charles Bonaparte (1950–), married Princess Béatrice of Bourbon-Two Sicilies, Jeanne-Françoise Valliccioni
        - Caroline Napoléon Bonaparte (1980–)
        - Jean-Christophe Napoléon Bonaparte (1986–), married Olympia von und zu Arco-Zinneberg
          - Louis Charles Napoléon Bonaparte (2022–)
        - Sophie Cathérine Bonaparte (1992–)
      - Catherine Bonaparte (1950–), married 1stly Marquis Nicola di San Germano (div), 2ndly Jean Dualé
      - Laura Bonaparte (1952–), married Jean-Claude Leconte
      - Jérôme Xavier Bonaparte (1957–)
  - Napoléon Louis Joseph Jérôme Bonaparte (1864–1932)
  - Maria Letizia Bonaparte (1866–1926), married Amedeo, 1st Duke of Aosta

== Honours ==
Styles of Jérôme I of Westphalia
- Reference style: His Majesty
- Spoken style: Your Majesty

- Second French Empire: Baton of Maréchal de France
- Second French Empire: Médaille militaire
- Second French Empire: Grand Croix of the Legion of Honour
- First French Empire: Grand Croix of the Legion of Honour
- First French Empire: Grand Croix of the Order of the Iron Crown
- First French Empire: Grand Croix of the Order of the Reunion
- Netherlands: Grand Croix of the Order of the Union
- Westphalia: Grand Master and Grand Croix of the Order of the Crown of Westphalia
- Belgium: Grand Cordon of the Order of Leopold, 9 June 1855
- Württemberg: Grand Cross of the Military Merit Order, 18 January 1807
- Württemberg: Grand Cross of the Order of the Württemberg Crown
- Grand Duchy of Hesse: Grand Cross of the Ludwig Order, August 1810
- Kingdom of Saxony: Knight of the Order of the Rue Crown, 1807
- Denmark: Knight of the Order of the Elephant, 22 March 1811
- Sardinia: Knight of the Order of the Annunciation, 29 November 1855

== See also ==
- House of Bonaparte
- Kingdom of Westphalia
- List of works by Eugène Guillaume

Jérôme Bonaparte House of Bonaparte Born: 15 November 1784 Died: 24 June 1860
Regnal titles
| New title | King of Westphalia; 8 July 1807 – 26 October 1813 | Kingdom dissolved |
Titles in pretence
| Kingdom dissolved | — TITULAR — King of Westphalia; 26 October 1813 – 24 June 1860; Reason for succession failure: Kingdom dissolved in 1813 | Succeeded by Napoléon-Jérôme |
French royalty
| Preceded by Robert, Duke of Chartres | Heir to the French Throne as Heir presumptive 18 December 1852 – 16 March 1856 | Succeeded by Louis Napoléon, Prince Imperial |
