= Frederick I of Württemberg =

Ruler of Württemberg from 1797 to 1816

Frederick I
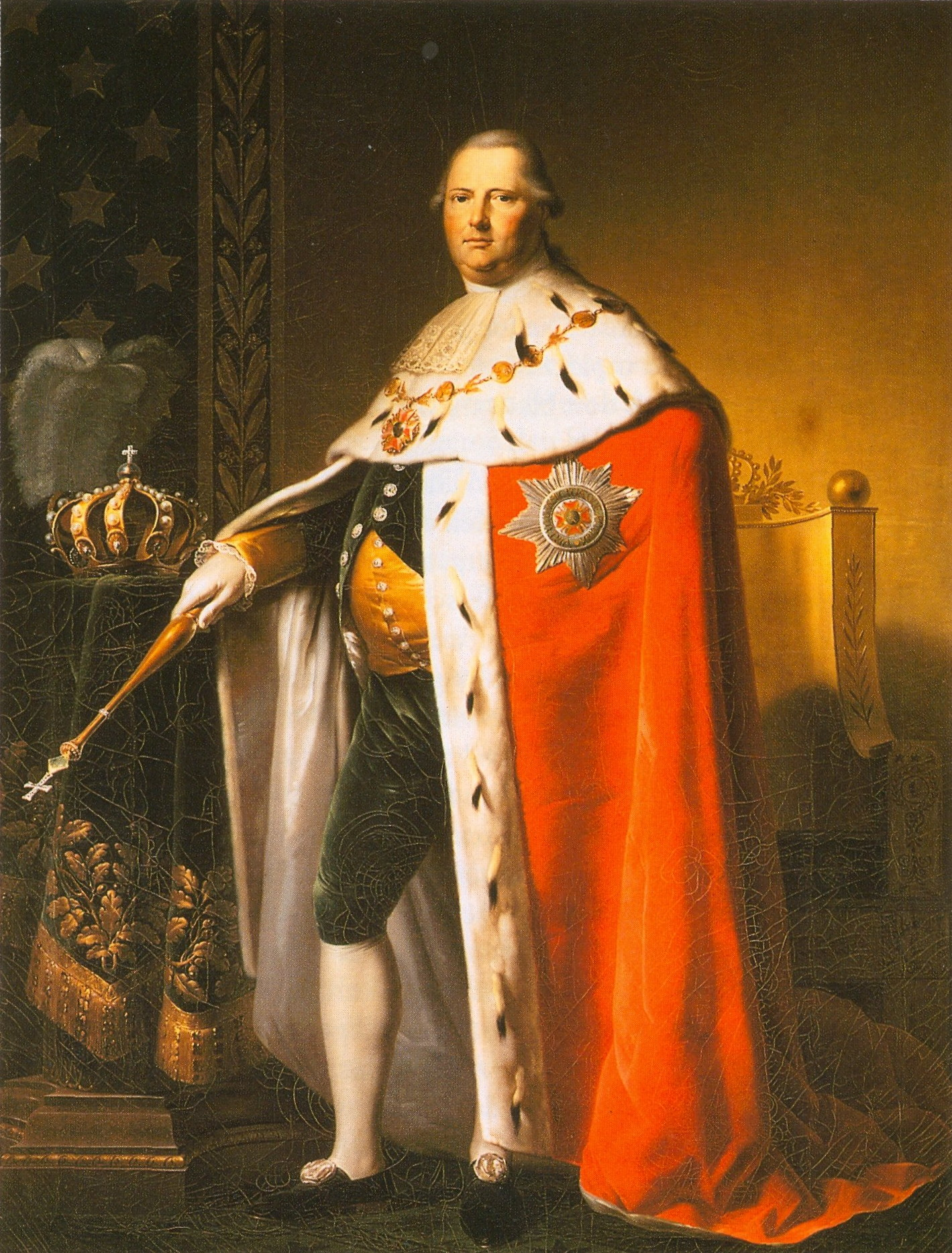
- Portrait by Johann Baptist Seele

Duke/Elector/King of Württemberg (Note: Duke until 25 February 1803, then Elector until 6 August 1806; King from 1 January 1806)
- Reign: 23 December 1797 – 30 October 1816
- Coronation: 1 January 1806
- Predecessor: Frederick II Eugene (as Duke)
- Successor: William I (as King)
- Born: 6 November 1754; Treptow an der Rega, Prussia (now Trzebiatów, Poland)
- Died: 30 October 1816 (aged 61); Stuttgart, Kingdom of Württemberg, Germany
- Burial: 1 November 1816; Schlosskirche, Ludwigsburg, Germany
- Spouses: Augusta of Brunswick-Wolfenbüttel (m. 1780; died 1788) Charlotte, Princess Royal (m. 1797)
- Issue: William I, King of Württemberg; Catharina, Queen of Westphalia; Prince Paul
Names
- German: Friedrich Wilhelm Karl
- Father: Frederick II Eugene, Duke of Württemberg
- Mother: Sophia Dorothea of Brandenburg-Schwedt
- Religion: Lutheranism

Frederick I (Frederick William Charles, German: Friedrich Wilhelm Karl; 6 November 1754 – 30 October 1816) was the ruler of Württemberg from 1797 to his death. He was the last duke of Württemberg (as Frederick III) from 1797 to 1803 and then the only elector of Württemberg from 1803 to 1806. With the approval of Napoleon, he became the first king of Württemberg in 1806.

== Early life ==
=== In Prussia ===
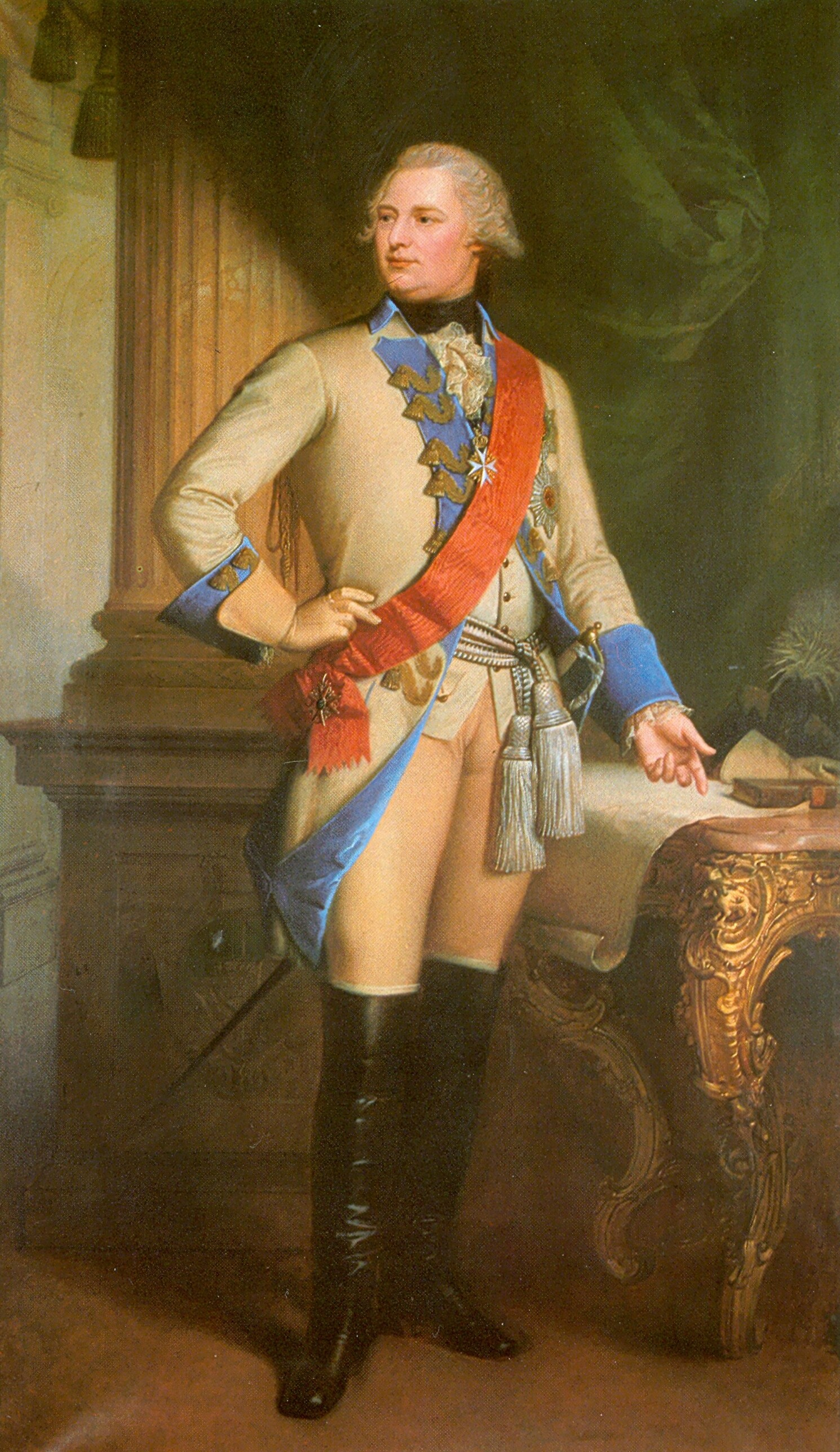
Copy by Georg Friedrich Erhardt of an English portrait of Frederick as a young man

Born in Treptow an der Rega, today Trzebiatów, Poland, Frederick was the eldest son of Frederick II Eugene, Duke of Württemberg, and Sophia Dorothea of Brandenburg-Schwedt. Frederick's father was the third son of Charles Alexander, Duke of Württemberg, and Frederick was thus the nephew of the long-reigning Duke Charles Eugene (German: Karl Eugen). Since neither Duke Charles Eugene nor his next brother, Louis Eugene (German: Ludwig Eugen), had any sons, it was expected that Frederick's father (also named Frederick) would eventually succeed to the duchy, and would be succeeded in turn by Frederick.

That eventuality was, however, many years in the future, and the birth of a legitimate son to either of his uncles would preempt Frederick's hopes conclusively. Further, his uncle the Duke was not disposed to give any member of his family any role in affairs of government. Frederick therefore determined—like his father—on a military career at the court of Frederick the Great. This later drew Frederick and his family into the Prussian king's network of marriage alliances—in 1776 his sister Sophie would marry the future emperor Paul I of Russia, son of Empress Catherine II. These family ties to Russia had immediate consequences for Frederick and far-reaching ones for Württemberg during the reorganisation of Europe in the wake of the 1814 Congress of Vienna.

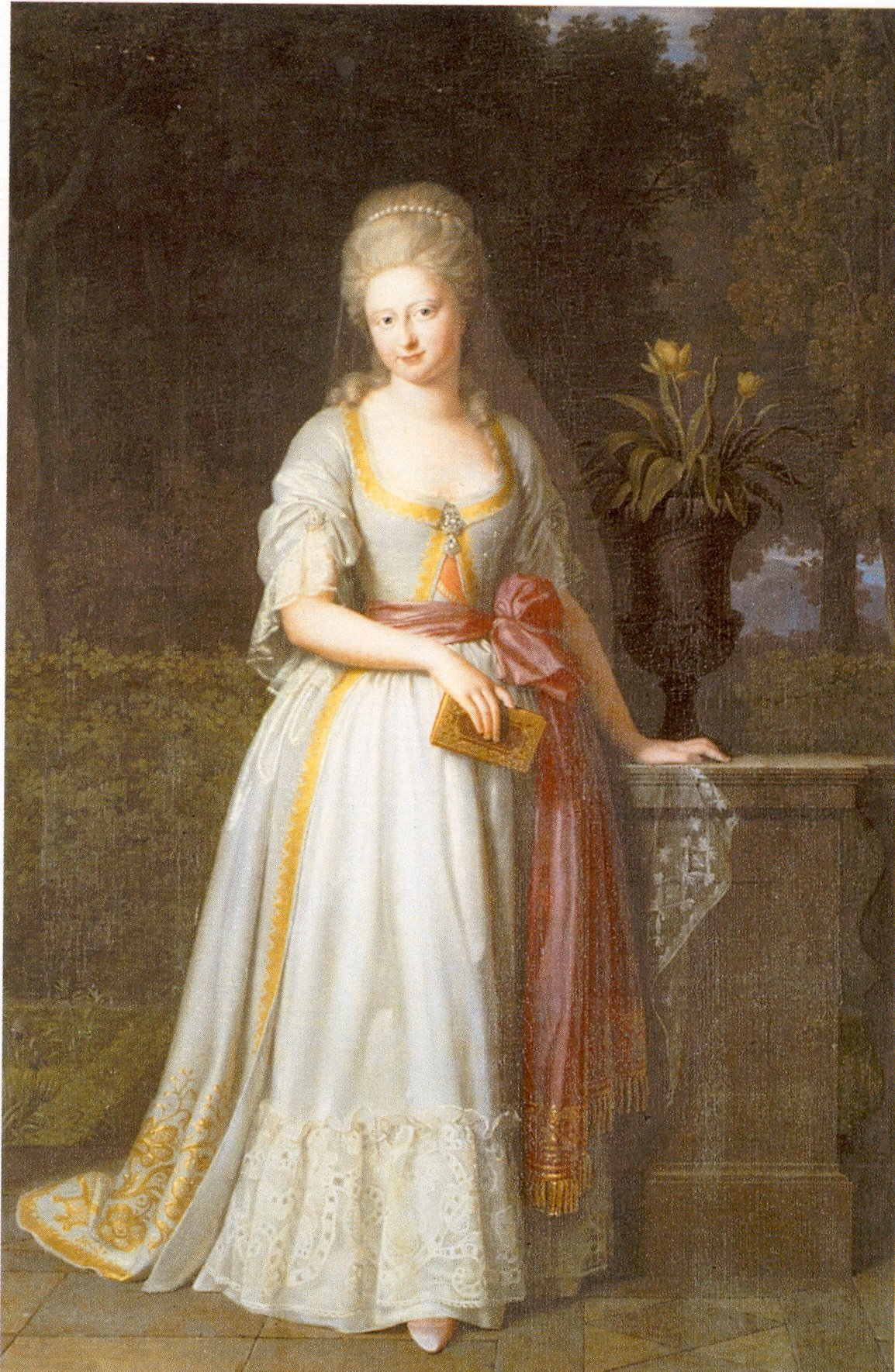
Augusta of Brunswick

In June 1774 he entered the Prussian Army as an oberst in the Kürassierregiment Lölhöffel, rising to a commander in the same unit in December 1776. He fought with it in the War of the Bavarian Succession. In 1780 he took over the 2nd Dragoon Regiment (Krockow).

Frederick married Duchess Augusta of Brunswick-Wolfenbüttel (aged sixteen, and thus ten years his junior) on 15 October 1780 at Braunschweig. She was the eldest daughter of Charles William Ferdinand, Duke of Brunswick-Luneburg and Princess Augusta of Great Britain, and thus a niece of George III of Great Britain and sister to Caroline of Brunswick, the future wife of George IV. The marriage was not a happy one—even during her first pregnancy in 1781 she wished to separate but was persuaded to stay with Frederick by her father. Though they had four children, Frederick was rumoured to be bisexual, with a coterie of young noblemen.

He had a good relationship with the King of Prussia and regularly took part in cabinet meetings, though this was clouded by his sister Elizabeth's 1788 marriage to Archduke Francis of Austria, later the last Holy Roman Emperor and the first Emperor of Austria. Frederick the Great feared that Prussia would become isolated by a closer relationship between Russia and Austria, whose heirs were both married to Frederick of Württemberg's sisters and (probably wrongly) blamed him for Francis's marriage.

=== In Russia ===
In 1781 Frederick resigned from the Prussian Army as a major general and the following year he accompanied his sister Sophie and her husband Paul to Russia, after a Grand Tour of Europe that the imperial couple had undertaken in France and Italy. Pleased with the well-spoken and confident young man, Catherine II appointed Frederick Governor of Eastern Finland, with his seat at Viipuri. From June to October 1783 he was also in command of a 15,000- to 20,000-strong corps in Kherson during the Russo-Turkish War, but he was not significantly involved in combat.

Frederick's relationship with his wife became more and more strained. He was reportedly violent towards her and after a play during a visit to Saint Petersburg in December 1786, Augusta asked for protection from Empress Catherine. She gave Augusta asylum and ordered Frederick to leave Russia. When Sophie protested at the treatment of her brother, Catherine replied, "It is not I who cover the Prince of Württemberg with opprobrium: on the contrary, it is I who try to bury abominations and it is my duty to suppress any further ones." Catherine's relationship with Frederick's brother-in-law, her own son Paul, had also broken down and so Frederick had to help protect his sister Sophie as she came under fire from Catherine. Augusta was sent to live at Lohde Castle in Western Estonia but died on 27 September 1788 from complications of amenorrhea, which she had been suffering from for several years, and although rumours were spread about a death from miscarriage they were disproven through an exhumation later. In the same year, Frederick sold his residence in Vyborg, known as Monrepos.

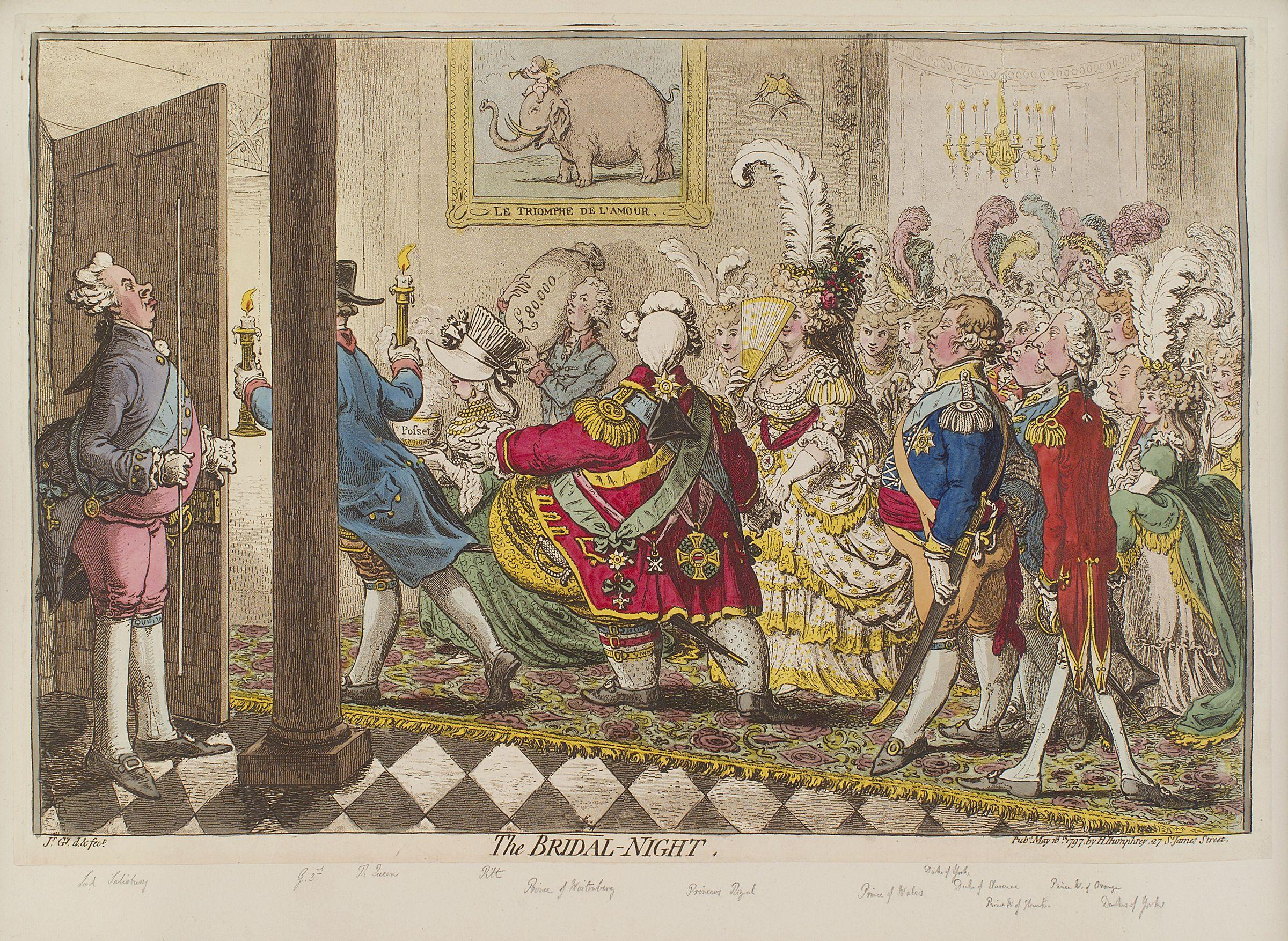
'The Bridal Night' by James Gilray, satirising Frederick's marriage to the Princess Royal

In the meantime, Frederick's succession to the throne of Württemberg had become more and more likely. In June 1789 he traveled to Paris to see the first stages of the French Revolution at first hand, before moving to Ludwigsburg the following year, much to the displeasure of his uncle Carl Eugen, who was still on the throne. His father came to the throne in 1795 and finally Frederick gained his long-wished political influences. His Brunswick-born father helped him make contact with the British royal family—Frederick's first wife had been a niece of George III. On 18 May 1797, Frederick married George's eldest daughter Charlotte at the Chapel Royal in St James's Palace.

== Reign ==
=== Duke and elector ===
On 23 December 1797, Frederick's father, who had succeeded his brother as Duke of Württemberg two years before, died, and Frederick became Duke of Württemberg as Frederick III. He was not to enjoy his reign undisturbed for long, however. In 1800, the French army occupied Württemberg and the Duke and Duchess fled to Vienna. In 1801, Duke Frederick ceded the enclave of Montbéliard to the French Republic, and received Ellwangen in exchange two years later.

In the Reichsdeputationshauptschluss, which reorganized the Empire as a result of the French annexation of the west bank of the Rhine, the Duke of Württemberg was raised to the dignity of Prince-elector. Frederick assumed the title Prince-Elector (German: Kurfürst) on 25 February 1803, and was thereafter known as the Elector of Württemberg. The reorganization of the Empire also secured the new Elector control of various ecclesiastical territories and former free cities, thus greatly increasing the size of his domains.

=== King ===
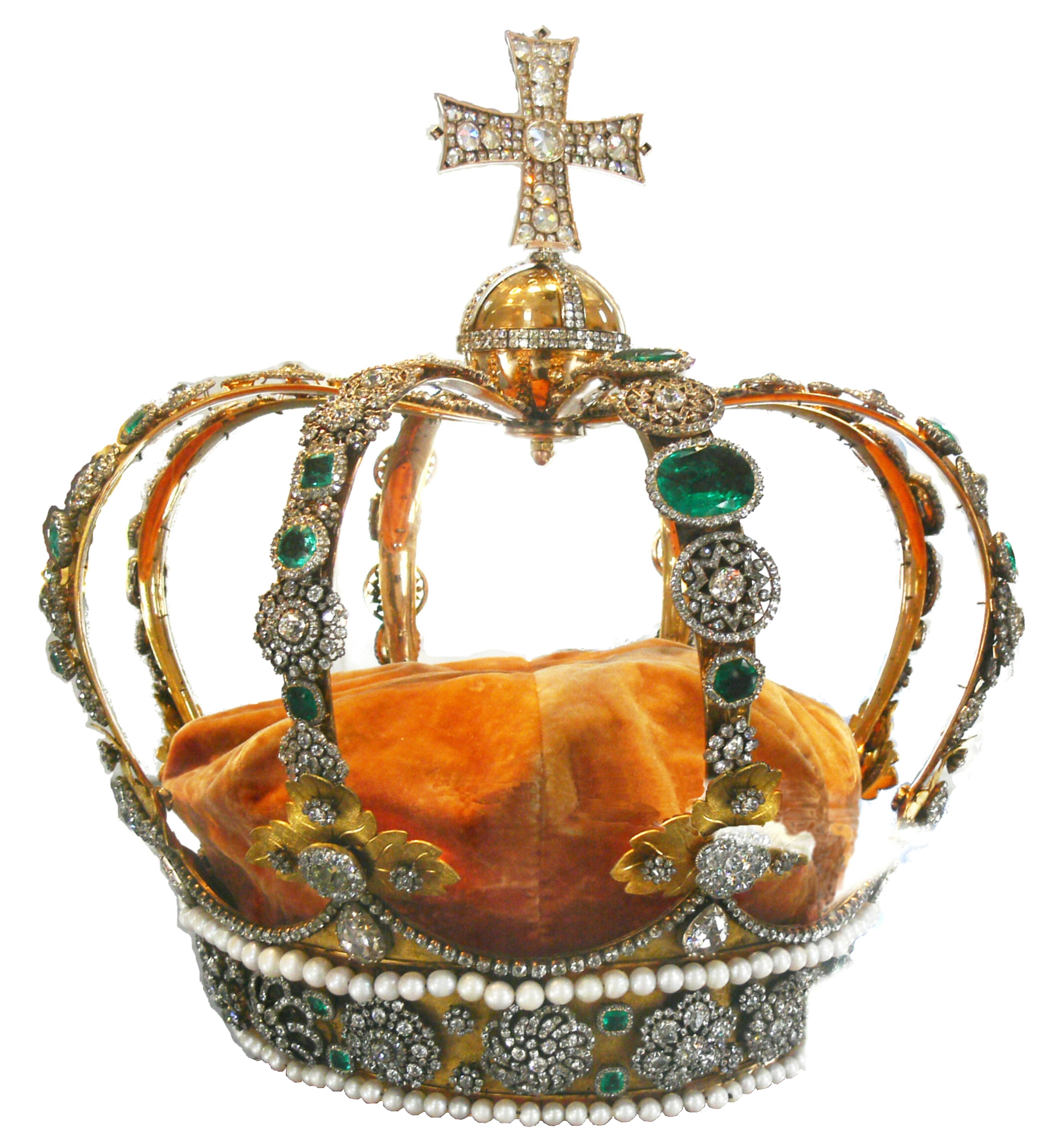
Crown of the Kingdom of Württemberg

In exchange for providing France with a large auxiliary force, Napoleon allowed Frederick to raise Württemberg to a kingdom on 26 December 1805. Fredrick was formally crowned king at Stuttgart on 1 January 1806, and took the regnal name of King Frederick I. Soon after, Württemberg seceded from the Holy Roman Empire and joined Napoleon's Confederation of the Rhine. Once again, the assumption of a new title also meant territorial expansion, as the territories of various nearby princes were mediatized and annexed by Württemberg. As a symbol of his alliance with Napoleon, Frederick's daughter, Princess Catharina, was married to Napoleon's youngest brother, Jérôme Bonaparte.

The newly elevated king's alliance with France technically made him the enemy of his father-in-law, George III. However, the king's dynastic connections would enable him to act as a go-between with Britain and various continental powers. In 1810, Frederick banished the composer Carl Maria von Weber from Württemberg on the pretext that Weber had mismanaged the funds of Frederick's brother, Louis, for whom Weber had served as secretary since 1807.

During the German campaign of 1813, Frederick changed sides and went over to the Allies, where his status as the brother-in-law of the British Prince Regent (later George IV) and uncle to the Russian emperor Alexander I helped his standing. After the fall of Napoleon, he attended the Congress of Vienna and was confirmed as king. At Vienna, Frederick and his ministers were very concerned to make sure that Württemberg would be able to retain all the territories it had gained in the past fifteen years. Frederick's harsh treatment of the mediatized princes within his domain made him one of the principal targets of the organization of dispossessed princes, which hoped to gain the support of the Powers in regaining their lost sovereignty. In the end, however, Austria, which was seen as the natural ally of the princes, was more interested in alliance with the medium-sized German states like Württemberg than in asserting its traditional role as protector of the smaller sovereigns of the old Empire; and Frederick was allowed to retain his dubiously acquired lands. Frederick, along with the other German princes, joined the new German Confederation in 1815. He died in Stuttgart in October of the next year.

When he became king, he granted his children and further male-line descendants the titles Princes and Princesses of Württemberg with the style Royal Highness, and he styled his siblings as Royal Highnesses with the titles Dukes and Duchesses of Württemberg.

He was very tall and obese: behind his back he was known as "The Great Belly-Gerent". Napoleon remarked that God had created the Prince to demonstrate the utmost extent to which the human skin could be stretched without bursting. In return, Frederick wondered how so much poison could fit in such a small head as Napoleon's.

== Marriages and issue ==
He married twice:

- Firstly on 15 October 1780, to Augusta of Brunswick-Wolfenbüttel, by whom he had four children:
  - King William I of Württemberg (1781–1864), who succeeded his father as king.
  - Princess Catharina of Württemberg (1783–1835), who on 22 August 1807 married Jérôme Bonaparte, King of Westphalia, youngest brother of Emperor Napoleon I of France, and had issue.
  - Duchess Sophia Dorothea of Württemberg (1783–1784), died in infancy.
  - Prince Paul of Württemberg (1785–1852), whose grandson was King William II of Württemberg.
- Secondly on 18 May 1797 he married Charlotte, Princess Royal, the eldest daughter of King George III of Great Britain, by whom he had only one child, a stillborn daughter delivered on 27 April 1798.

== Honours ==
The then Erbprinz of Württemberg was awarded most of his honorary titles on his trip to England in 1797:

- Honorary Member of the Academy of Fine Arts Vienna, 8 of February 1815
- Honorary Doctor of Law by University of Oxford, 15 May 1797
- Honorary Citizen of Portsmouth, 20 April 1797
- Honorary Citizen of Newport, 22 April 1797
- Honorary Citizen of Bath, 27 April 1797
- Honorary Citizen of New Sarum, 1 May 1797
- Honorary Citizen of Oxford, 3 May 1797
- Honorary Citizen of Windsor, 23 May 1797

Military ranks Frederick held before rising to the throne:

- Prussia
  - Honorary Colonel of Infantry, 28 January 1759
  - Honorary General Major of Cavalry, 15 August 1769
  - Colonel of Cavalry, 2 July 1774
  - General Major of Cavalry, 9 June 1780
  - Left service, 1781
- Russia
  - General Lieutenant, 10 November 1780
  - General Governor of Finland, 6 April 1782
  - Expelled 1787
- Swabian Circle
  - Colonel, 13 July 1776
  - General Major, 10 June 1780
  - General of Cavalry, 12 October 1795
  - Took the throne, 1797

== Ancestry ==
Ancestors of Frederick I of Württemberg

8. Frederick Charles, Duke of Württemberg-Winnental
4. Charles Alexander, Duke of Württemberg
9. Princess Eleonore Juliane of Brandenburg-Ansbach
2. Frederick II Eugene, Duke of Württemberg
10. Anselm Franz, Prince of Thurn and Taxis
5. Princess Marie Auguste of Thurn and Taxis
11. Princess Maria Ludovika of Lobkowicz
1. Frederick I of Württemberg
12. Philip William, Margrave of Brandenburg-Schwedt
6. Frederick William, Margrave of Brandenburg-Schwedt
13. Princess Johanna Charlotte of Anhalt-Dessau
3. Princess Friederike of Brandenburg-Schwedt
14. Frederick William I of Prussia
7. Princess Sophia Dorothea of Prussia
15. Princess Sophia Dorothea of Hanover

== Notes ==
Frederick I of Württemberg House of Württemberg Born: 6 November 1754 Died: 30 October 1816
Regnal titles
| Preceded by Frederick II Eugene | Duke of Württemberg; 1797–1803 | Change of title |
| New title Elevation in rank | Elector of Württemberg; 1803–1806 | Change of title |
| New title Elevation in rank | King of Württemberg; 1806–1816 | Succeeded by William I |
