= Catharina of Württemberg =

Queen of Westphalia from 1807 to 1813

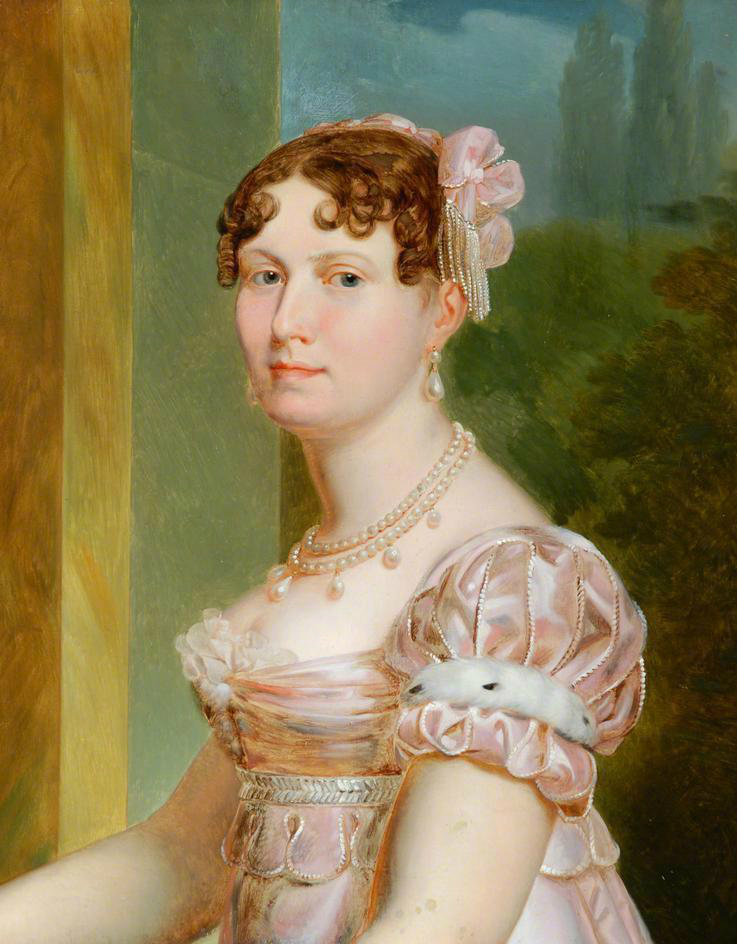
- Catharina, circa 1810-1820

Queen consort of Westphalia
- Tenure: 22 August 1807 – 26 October 1813
- Born: 21 February 1783; Saint Petersburg, Russian Empire
- Died: 29 November 1835 (aged 52); Lausanne, Switzerland
- Burial: Schlosskirche, Ludwigsburg Palace
- Spouse: Jérôme Napoleon I of Westphalia (m. 1807)
- Issue: Prince Jérôme; Mathilde, Princess of San Donato; Napoléon, 2nd Prince of Monfort
Names
- German: Friederike Katharina Sophie Dorothea
- House: Württemberg
- Father: Frederick I of Württemberg
- Mother: Augusta of Brunswick-Wolfenbüttel

Catharina of Württemberg (full name: Friederike Katharina Sophie Dorothea; 21 February 1783 – 29 November 1835) was Queen of Westphalia by marriage to Jérôme Bonaparte, who reigned as King of Westphalia between 1807 and 1813.

== Life ==
Catharina was born in Saint Petersburg, Russian Empire, to the later King Frederick I of Württemberg and his first wife, Duchess Augusta of Brunswick-Wolfenbüttel. Her mother, who died when Catharina was five years old, was a sister of Caroline of Brunswick and a niece of King George III of the United Kingdom. After the death of Catharina's mother, her father married Charlotte, Princess Royal, eldest daughter of George III and thus a first cousin of his first wife.

In 1803, Württemberg entered into an alliance with France under Emperor Napoleon I, and one of the terms of the treaty was the marriage of Catharina with Jérôme Bonaparte, Napoleon's younger brother. The wedding was held four years later, on 22 August 1807, at the Royal Palace of Fontainebleau in France. Upon marriage, Catharina became Queen consort of the Kingdom of Westphalia. Reportedly, Catharina and Jérôme bonded strongly and had a happy marriage, remaining firmly attached to each other. King Jérôme, however, was unfaithful with multiple partners, including a three-year relationship with Diana Rabe von Pappenheim, but Catharina chose to turn a blind eye.

When the kingdom of Westphalia was dissolved in 1813, she followed Jerome to France. During the war, she and Désirée Clary took refuge with Julie Clary at Mortefontaine, and when the allied troops took Paris, they took refuge in the home of Desirée Clary in the capital.

After the downfall of the Napoleonic Empire in 1814, her father expected her to separate from Jerome, as Empress Marie Louise had done from Napoleon, but instead she followed him into exile to Trieste in Austrian Italy.

During the Hundred Days in 1815, she helped Jerome to escape and join Napoleon, and was as a consequence deported to Württemberg, where she was placed under house arrest. After the defeat of Napoleon, she was joined by her spouse in house arrest.

Catharina and Jerome were eventually released from house arrest and spent their remaining life together in Trieste and Switzerland, under the name of the Princess and Prince of Montfort. In November 1835, Catharina died in Lausanne, Switzerland.

== Issue ==
Catharina and Jérôme had three children:

- Jérôme Napoléon Charles Bonaparte (1814–1847), served in the army of his maternal uncle, King William I of Württemberg.
- Mathilde Bonaparte (1820–1904), married Anatoly Demidov, Prince of San Donato. She was prominent during and after the Second Empire as a hostess to men of arts and letters.
- Napoléon Joseph Charles Paul Bonaparte (1822–1891), was a close advisor to his cousin Napoleon III and, in particular, was seen as a leading advocate of French intervention in Italy and of the Italian nationalists (he was son-in-law of King Victor Emmanuel II of Italy).
