= Église Saint-Leu-Saint Gilles (Saint-Leu-la-Forêt) =

Church located in Saint-Leu-la-Forêt, France

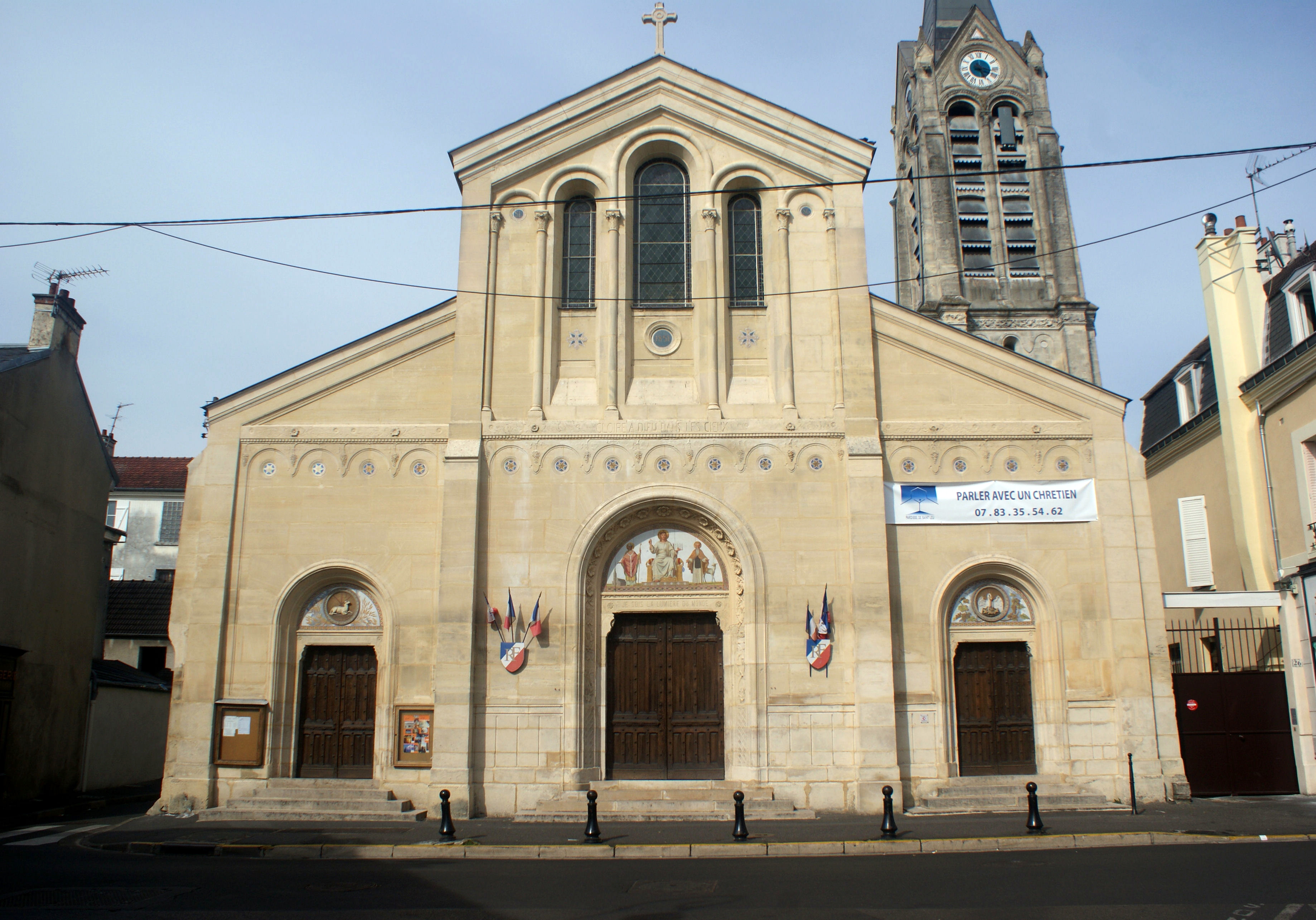
- T

Religion
- Affiliation: Roman Catholic
- Province: Archdiocese of Paris

Location
- Location: Saint-Leu-la-Forêt, France
- Interactive map of Église Saint-Leu-Saint Gilles
- Coordinates: 49°01′05″N 2°14′43″E

Architecture
- Architect: Eugène Lacroix
- Completed: 1851

The Église Saint-Leu-Saint Gilles is a Roman Catholic church on the Rue Général Leclerc in the French town of Saint-Leu-la-Forêt, about 14 kilometers north of Paris. Commissioned by Emperor Napoleon III, the church houses the tomb of his father, Louis Napoleon Bonaparte, King of Holland, as well as those of his two brothers.

== History ==
The church was built in 1849 by Prince Louis-Napoléon Bonaparte, then President of France and subsequently Emperor. It replaced an earlier church from the seventeenth century, inaugurated on November 7, 1690. The church was in turn a replacement of the original church from the twelfth century, located in the forest near Montmorency and demolished in 1686.

The architect Eugène Lacroix was inspired by the Italian basilicas, in particular the Basilica of Sant'Apollinare Nuovo in Ravenna. A large portal with a semicircular archivolt and a tympanum decorated with a mosaic provides access to the ship. Smaller gates flank the main entrance on both sides. The upper part of the facade of the nave is decorated with five semicircular arches. The strongly distinctive bell tower of the main building is placed in front of the lateral northeast façade. The edges between the first and second floor as well as the walls are decorated with decorative frames in the style of the Italian Renaissance.

At the back of the choir, as a tribute to the Bonaparte family and especially Louis Napoleon, the brother of Emperor Napoleon I and Napoleon III's father, there is a tomb for Louis Bonaparte, King of Holland, made by Louis Petitot. On the front of the tomb are the faces of his sons Napoléon Charles Bonaparte and Napoléon Louis Bonaparte and his father Carlo Buonaparte. Behind the monument is a fresco by Sébastien-Melchior Cornu with four angels carrying Saint Louis, St. Charles and St. Napoleon. This wall has recently been restored using the Napoleon Foundation.

Also of interest are the graves in the chapel on the right side of the choir to commemorate the Baroness (Madame) de Broc, one of Queen Hortense de Beauharnais matrons (Head Sister) of honor, and Baroness Broc's sister, the wife of Marshal Michel Ney .

The church of Saint-Gilles in St-Leu was consecrated on 31 October 1851 by Monsignor Gros, bishop of Versailles, accompanied by members of his family and other important figures in the presence of President Napoleon III. In 1869 the emperor offered a beautiful Cavaillé-Coll organ. Napoleon III initially had plans for enormous murals, but this was postponed by the Franco-German War of 1870 and the fall of the Second French Empire.

== Family Bonaparte ==
It was intended that the entire Bonaparte family, including Emperor Napoleon I, would be buried in the church. There are four sarcophagi in the crypt. Louis Napoleon was reburied here in 1851 after first buried in Livorno and on 29 September 1847 in the chapel of Saint Leu, of Baroness de Broc (1784-1813), as well as his sons Napoleon Charles Bonaparte, Prince of Holland, and Napoleon Louis Bonaparte, who was King of Holland from 1 July 1810 to 9 July 1810.

The fourth crypt is empty. Here from 1851 Carlo Maria Buonaparte (French: Charles-Marie Bonaparte) was buried, whose remains were transferred on 28 April 1951 to the Imperial Chapel of Ajaccio. Charles-Marie (Carlo Maria) Bonaparte Born March 27, 1745, February 24, 1785 died in Montpellier from stomach cancer. He was buried in Montpellier in the vaults of the Convent of the Cordeliers. His body was buried in 1803 in the gardens of Mortefontaine, property of Joseph Bonaparte. When the area was returned to the Prince of Condé, in 1819, his remains were transferred to the Chapel of Saint-Leu and in 1851 to the Église Saint-Leu-Saint Gilles. The sarcophagus of Charles bears the wrong date of death, namely 24 April 1785 instead of 24 February.

Emperor Napoleon I was reburied in December 1840 in the Dôme des Invalides in Paris, as were his other brothers Jérôme Bonaparte and Joseph Bonaparte. On December 15, 1940, the chest of Napoleon II, was transferred by Adolf Hitler to Paris and buried in the crypt of the Dôme des Invalides. A major restoration of crypts in the Église Saint-Leu-Saint Gilles was carried out in 1995/1996 with the support of the international club Skal.

== Worth knowing ==
- The church and the crypt can only be visited through the Saint-Leu-la-Foret Syndicat D'Initiative (local tourist office) 13 Avenue du Général Leclerc 95320 Saint-Leu-La Forêt (diagonally opposite the church) [3]
- With support from a club for managers in tourism, an amount of NLG 45,000 was raised in 1997 for the restoration of the church.

== Images ==
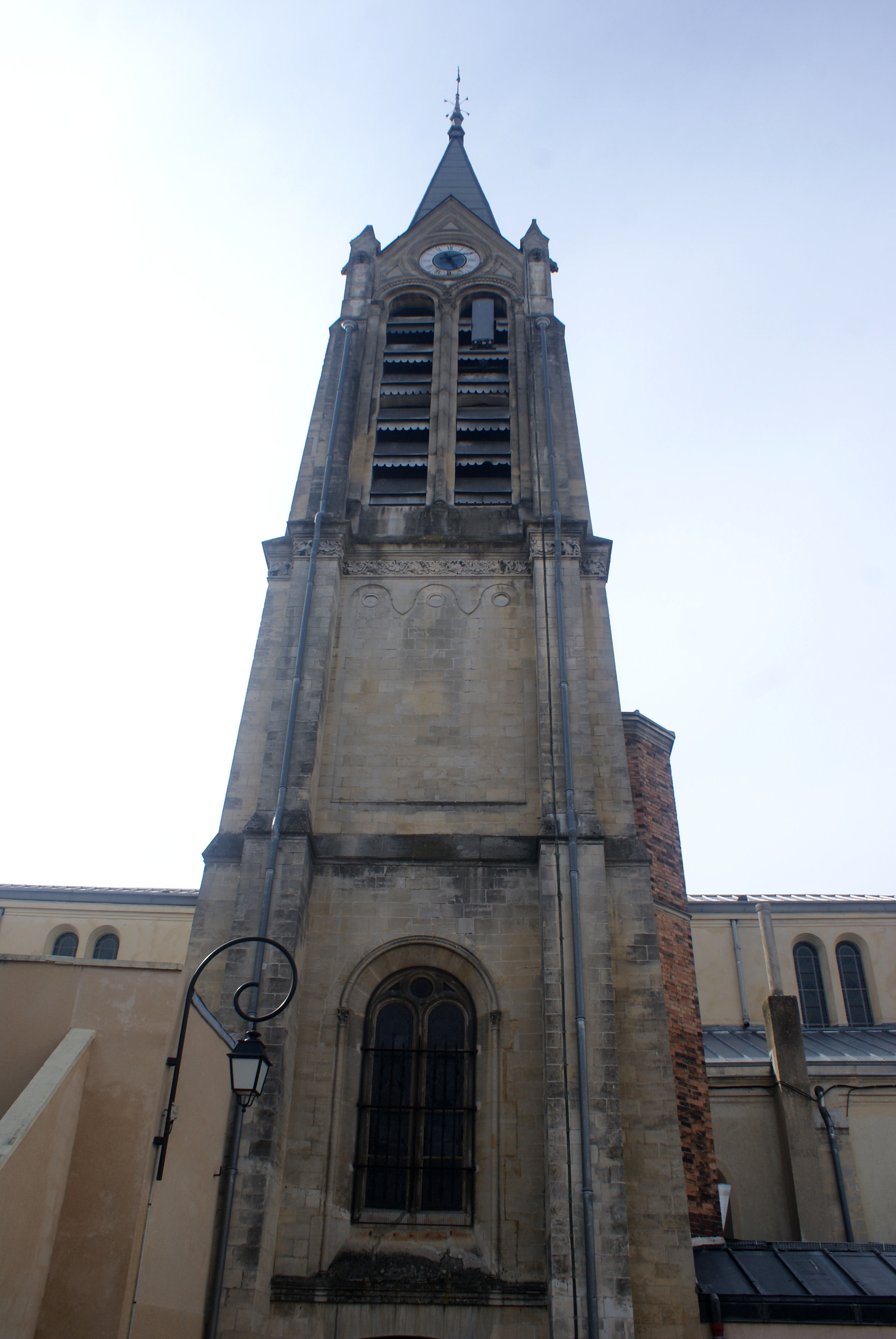
Bell tower

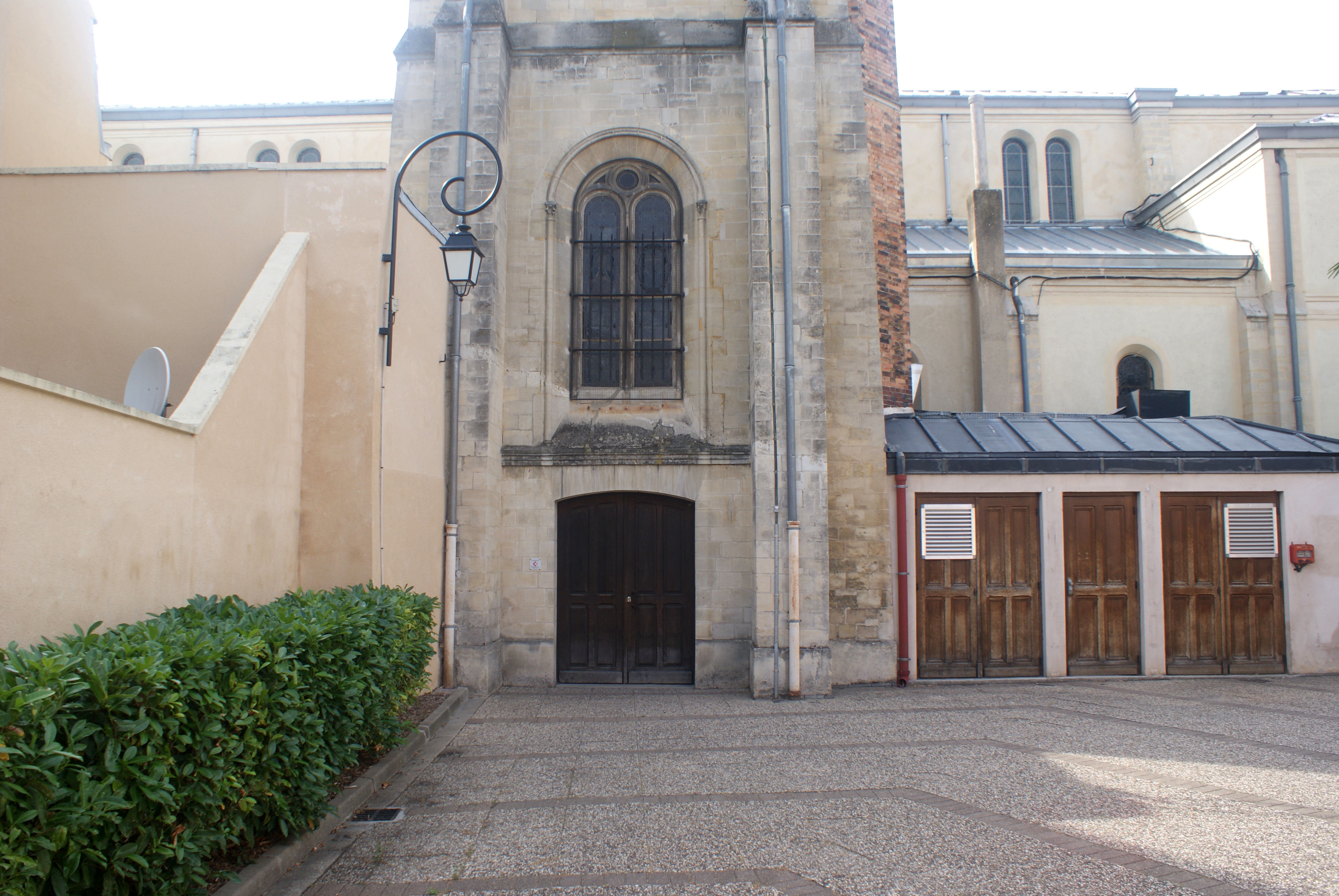
Side entrance church

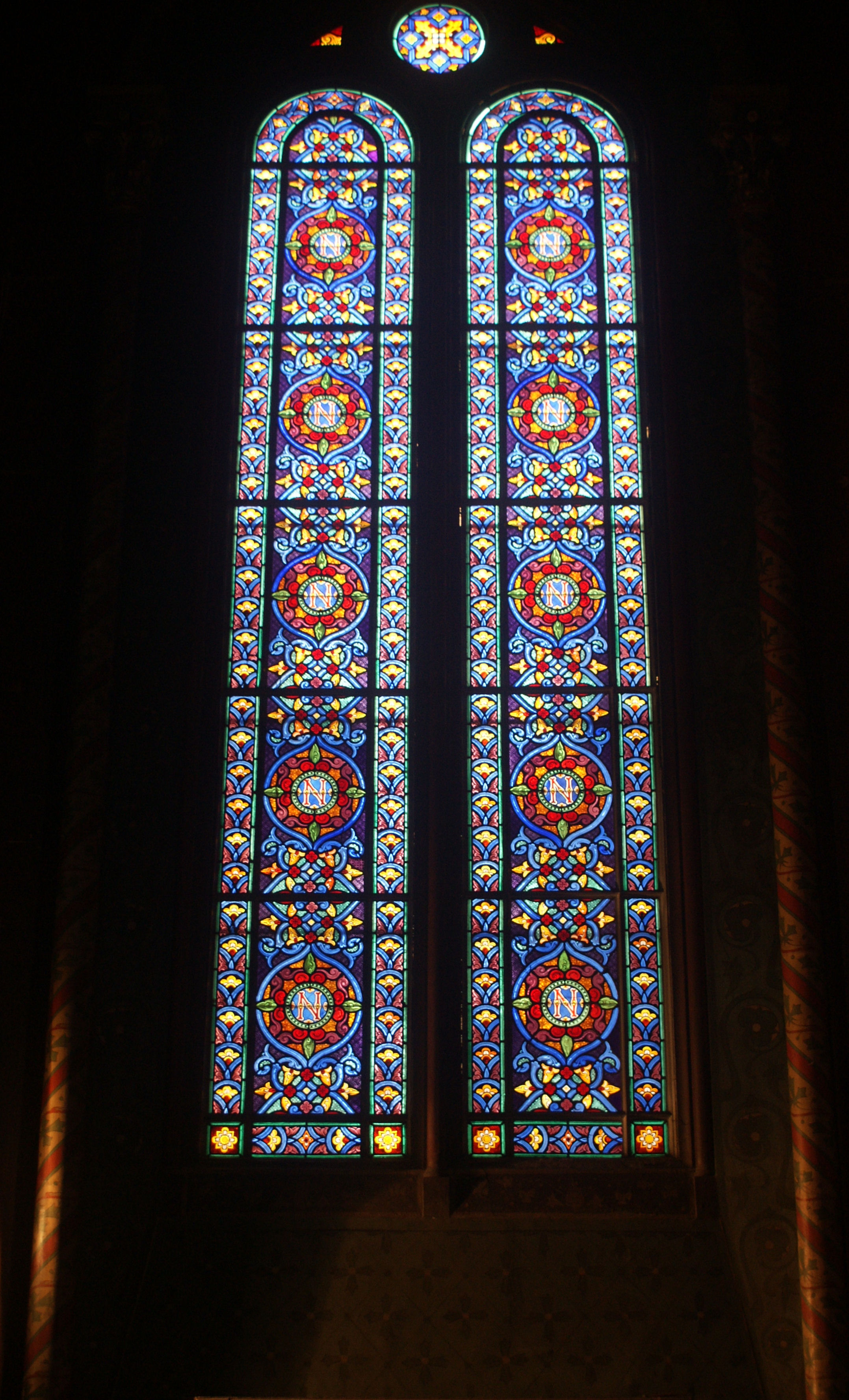
Glass in Lead with the letter 'N' from Napoleon

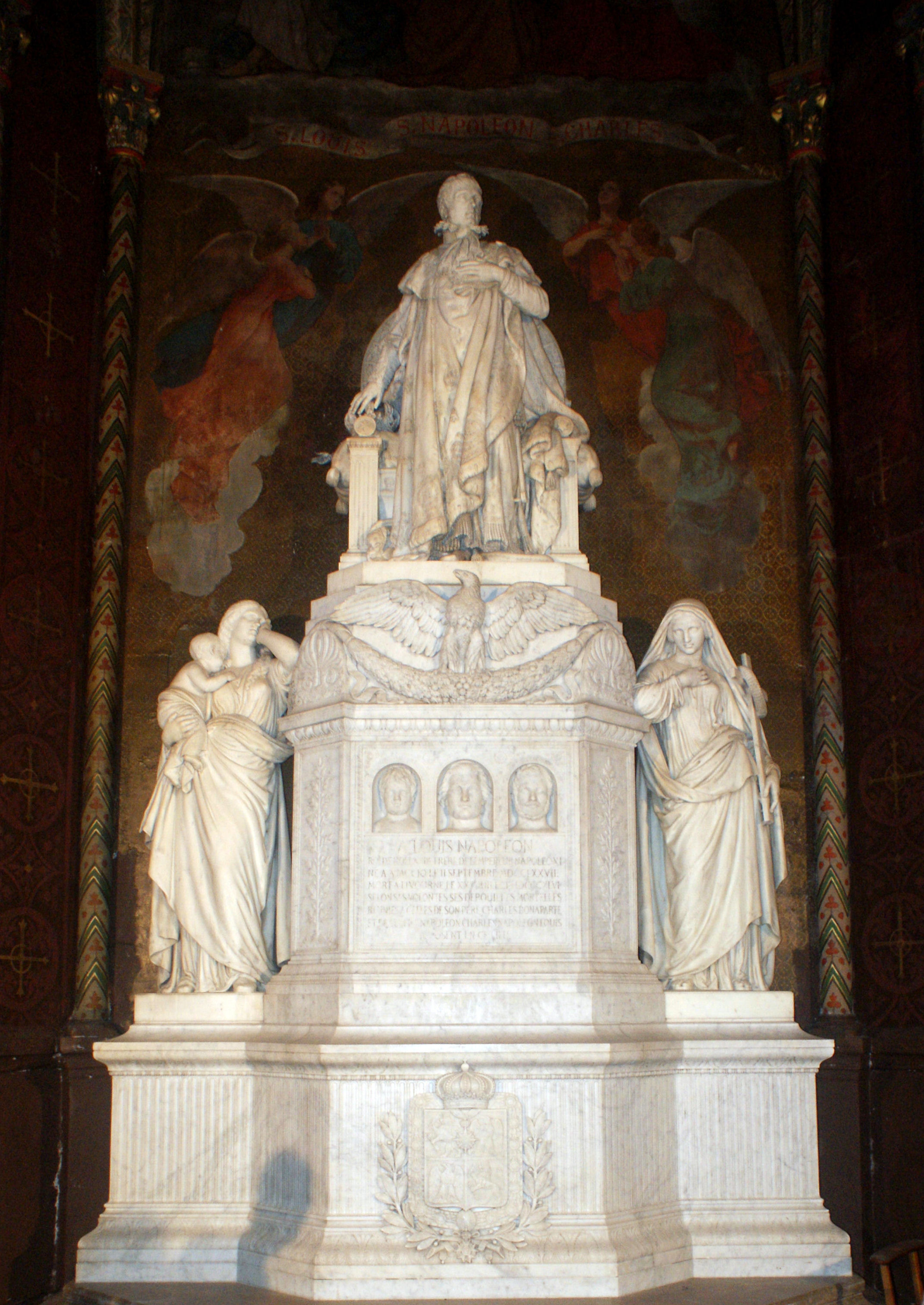
Tomb of Louis Napoleon

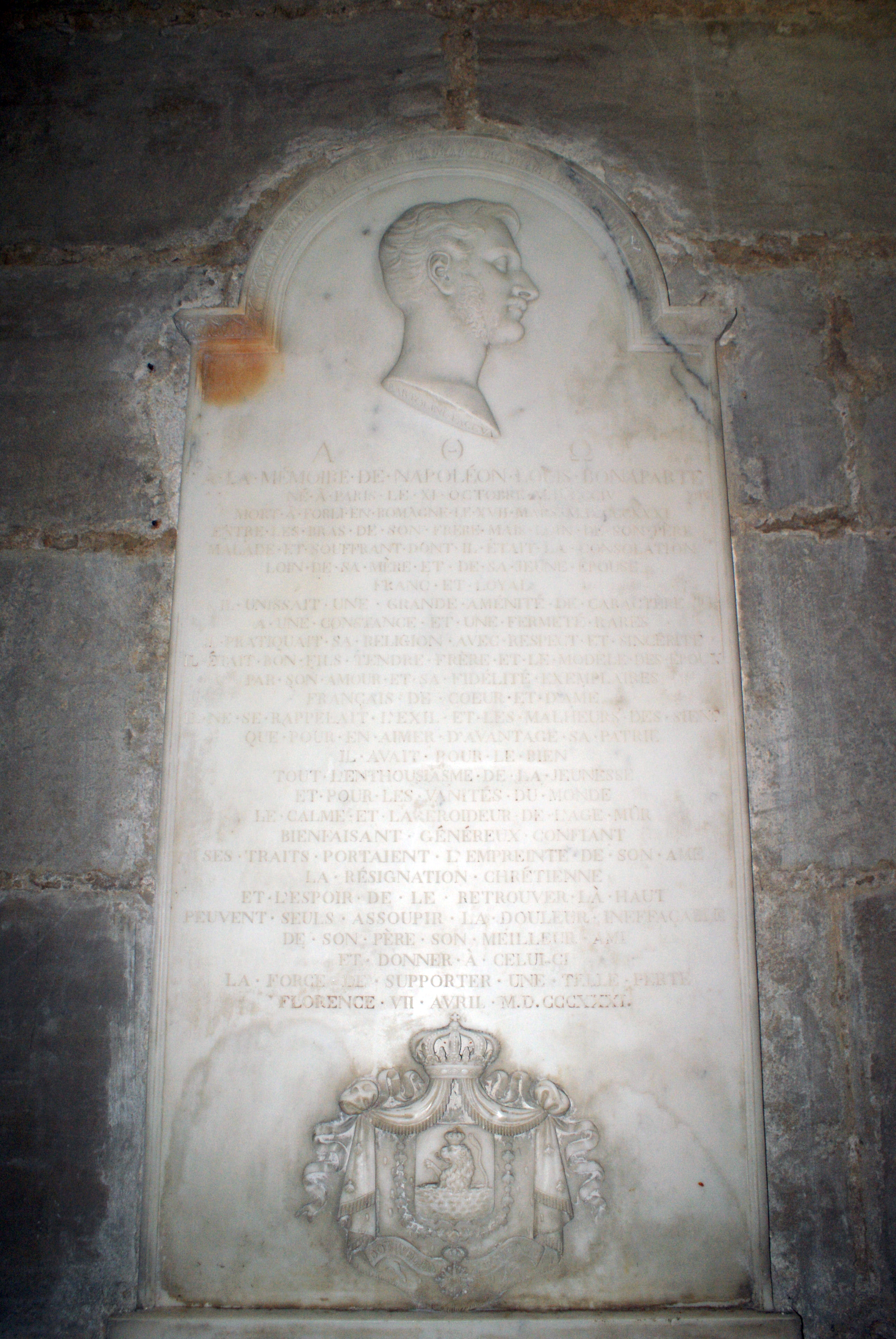
Memorial plaque of Louis Napoleon, with the Dutch Lion in his coat of arms, in a room next to the crypt

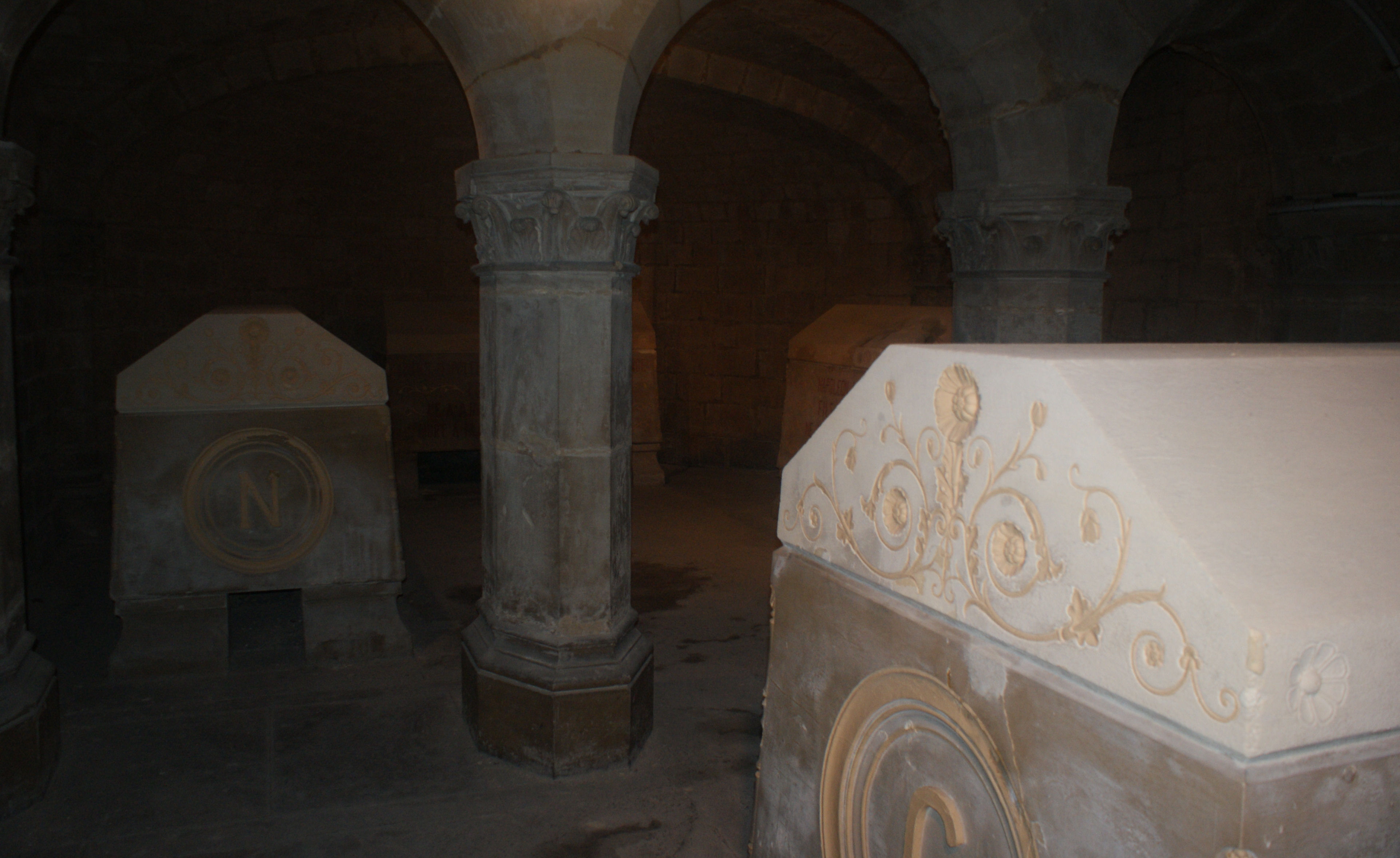
Crypte Familie Bonaparte

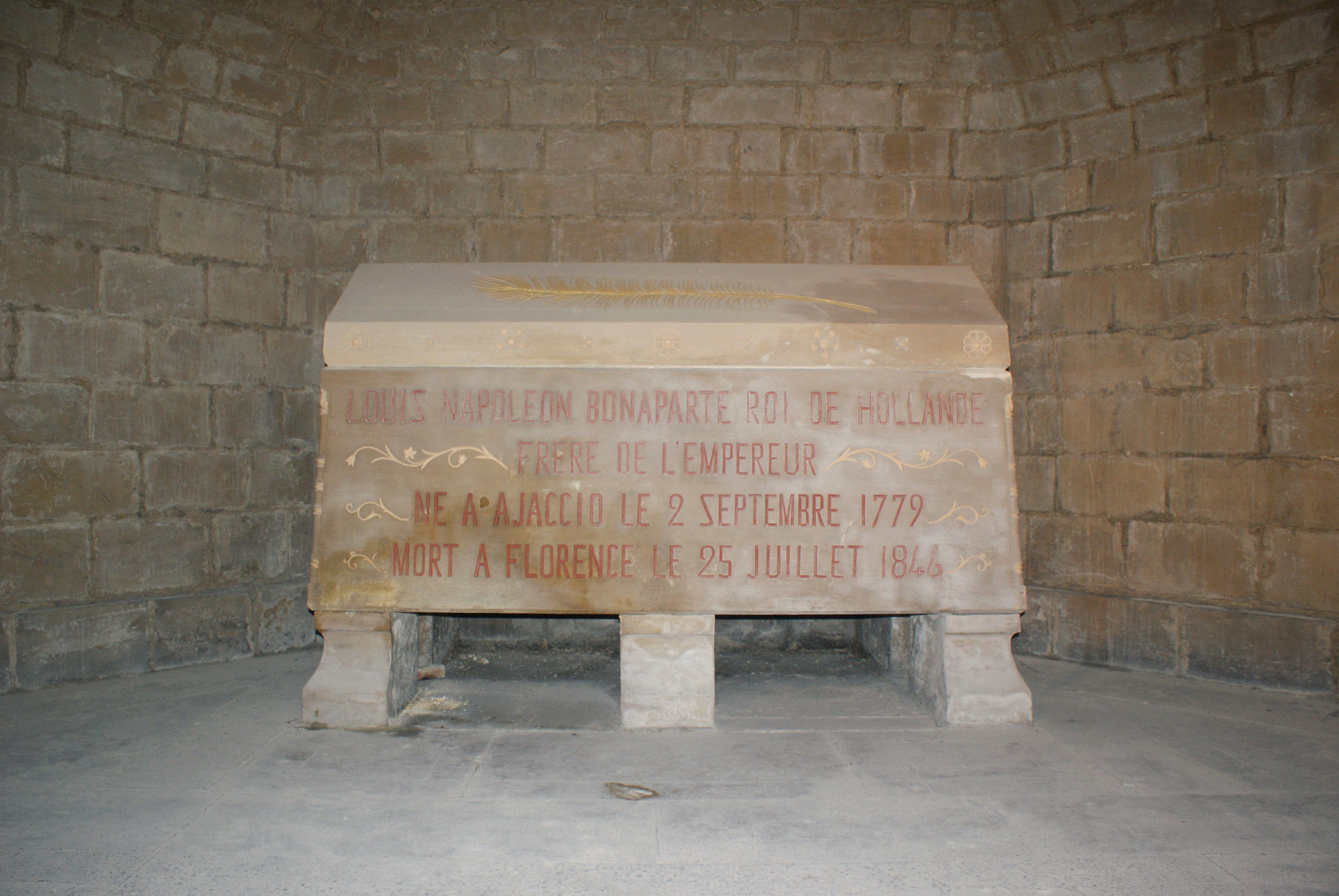
Sarcophagus Lodewijk Napoleon Bonaparte, King of Holland

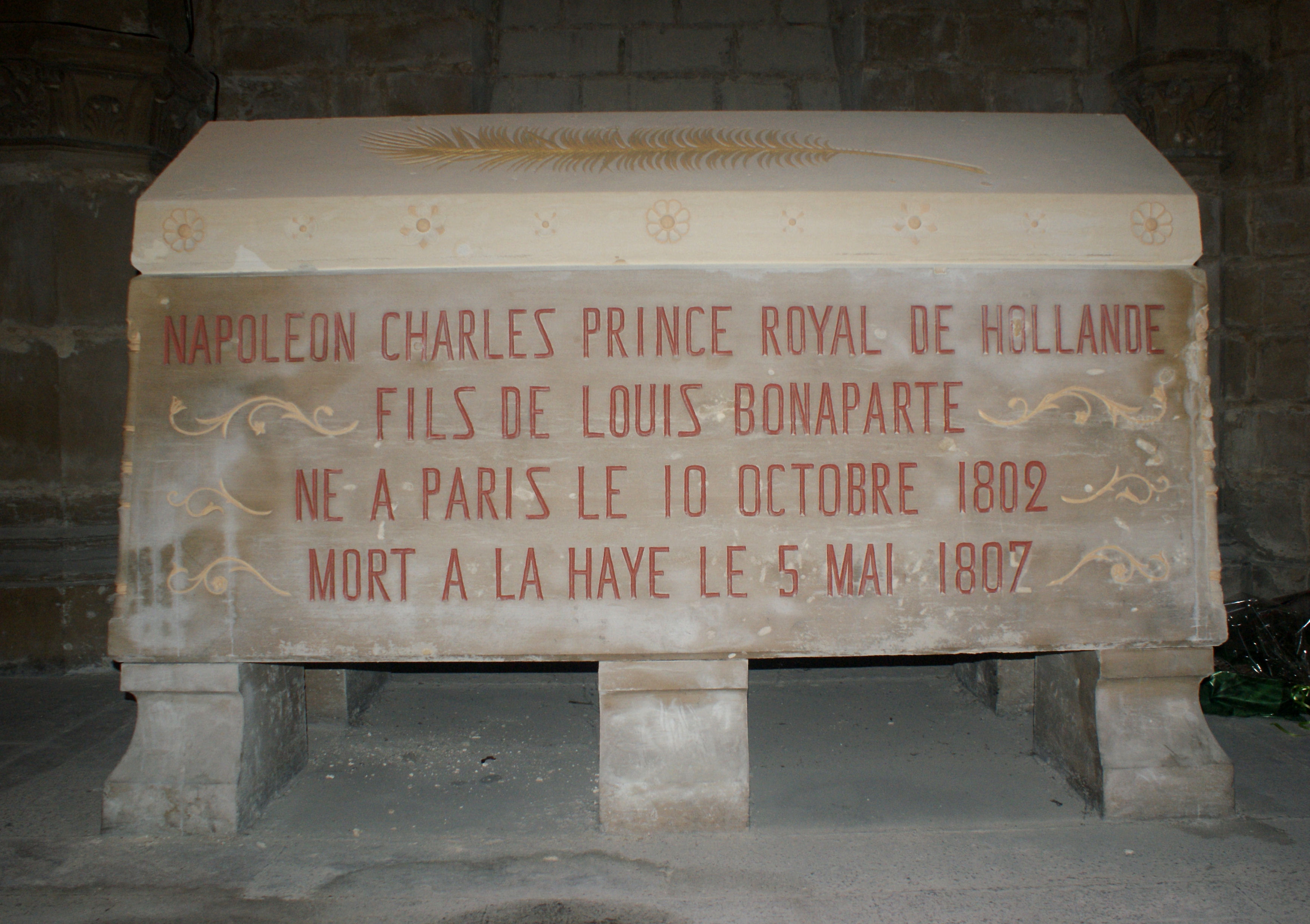
Sarcophagus Napoleon Karel Bonaparte, Prince of Holland

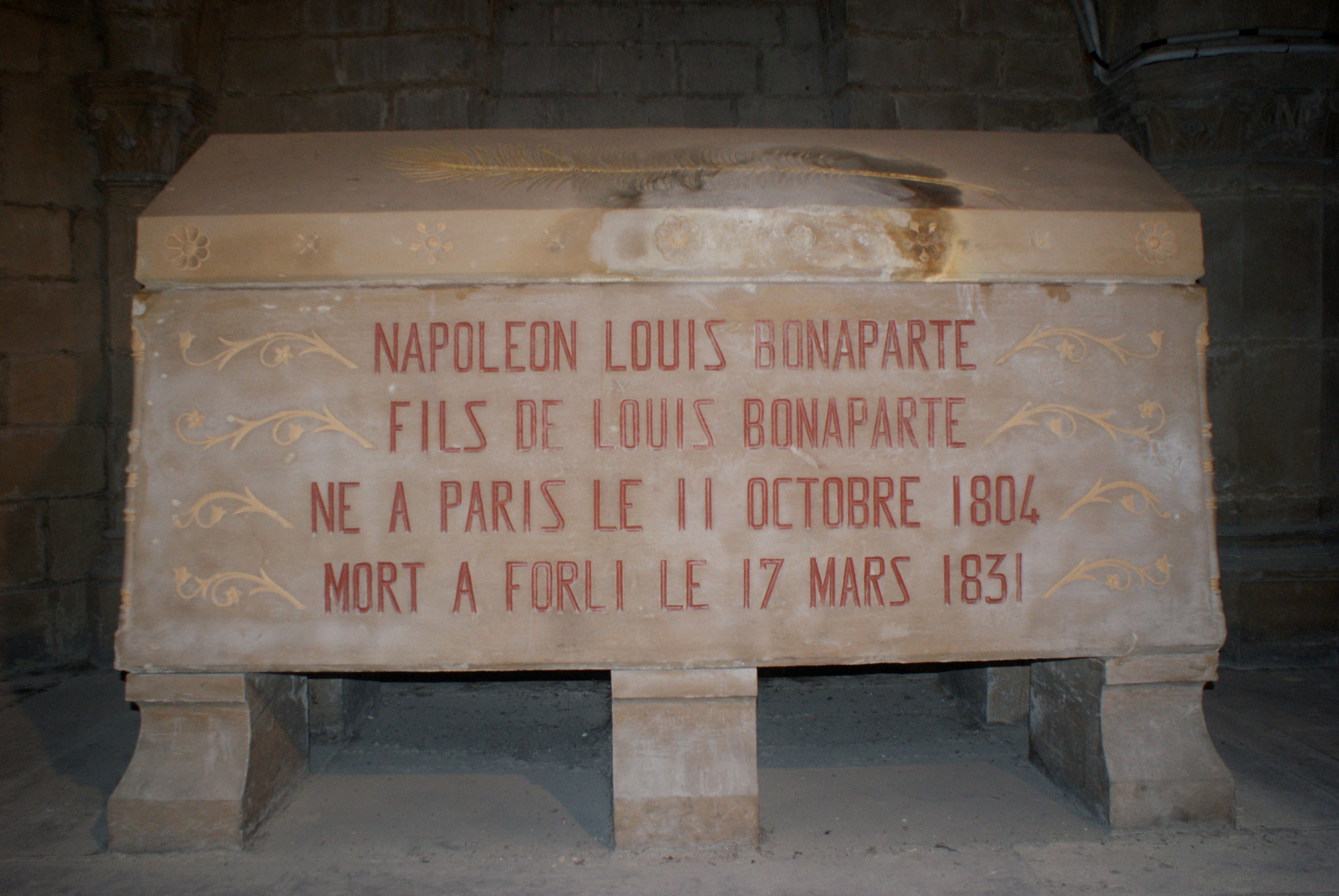
Sarcophagus Napoleon Lodewijk Bonaparte, King of Holland

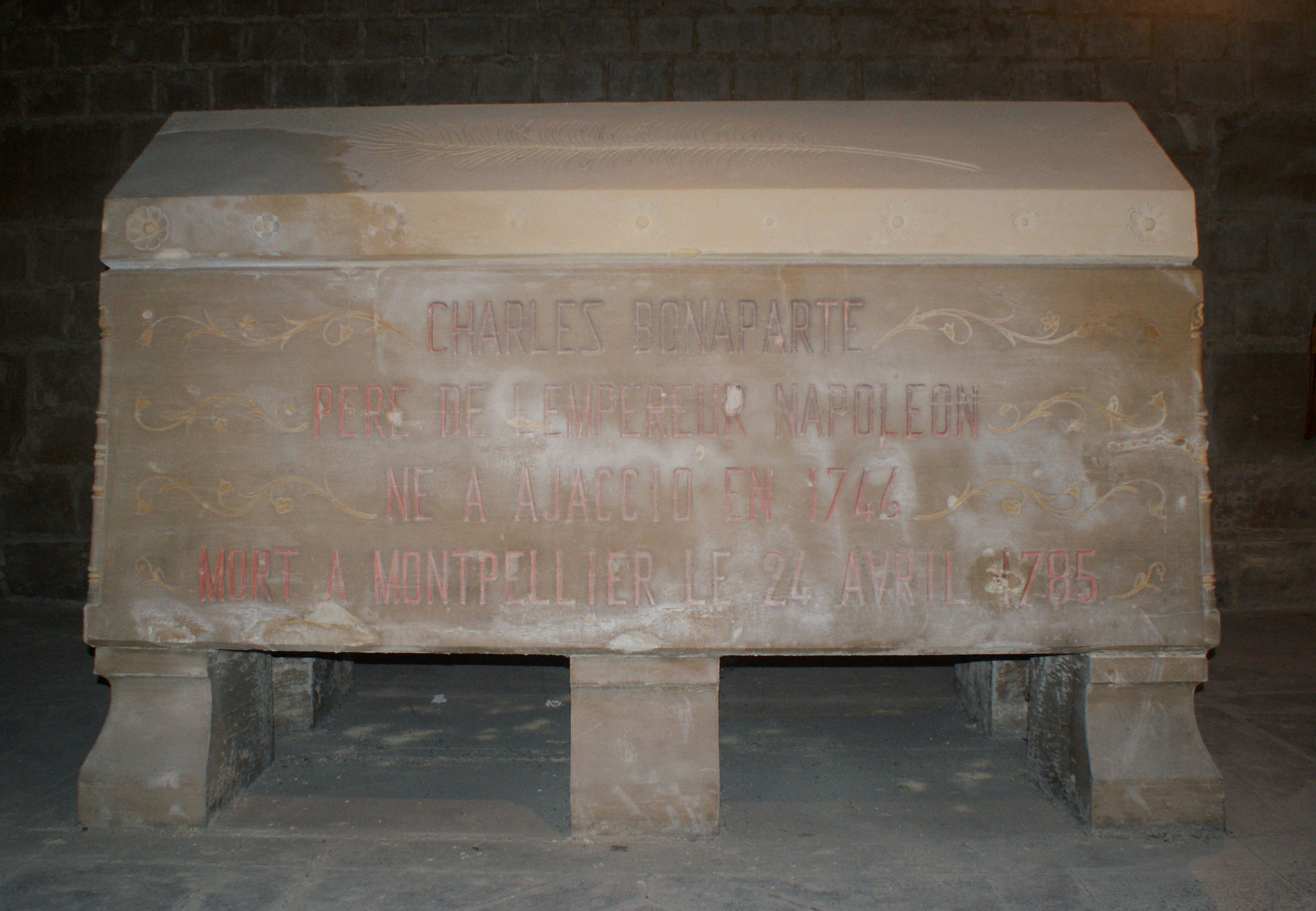
Sarcophagus Carlo Maria Buonaparte

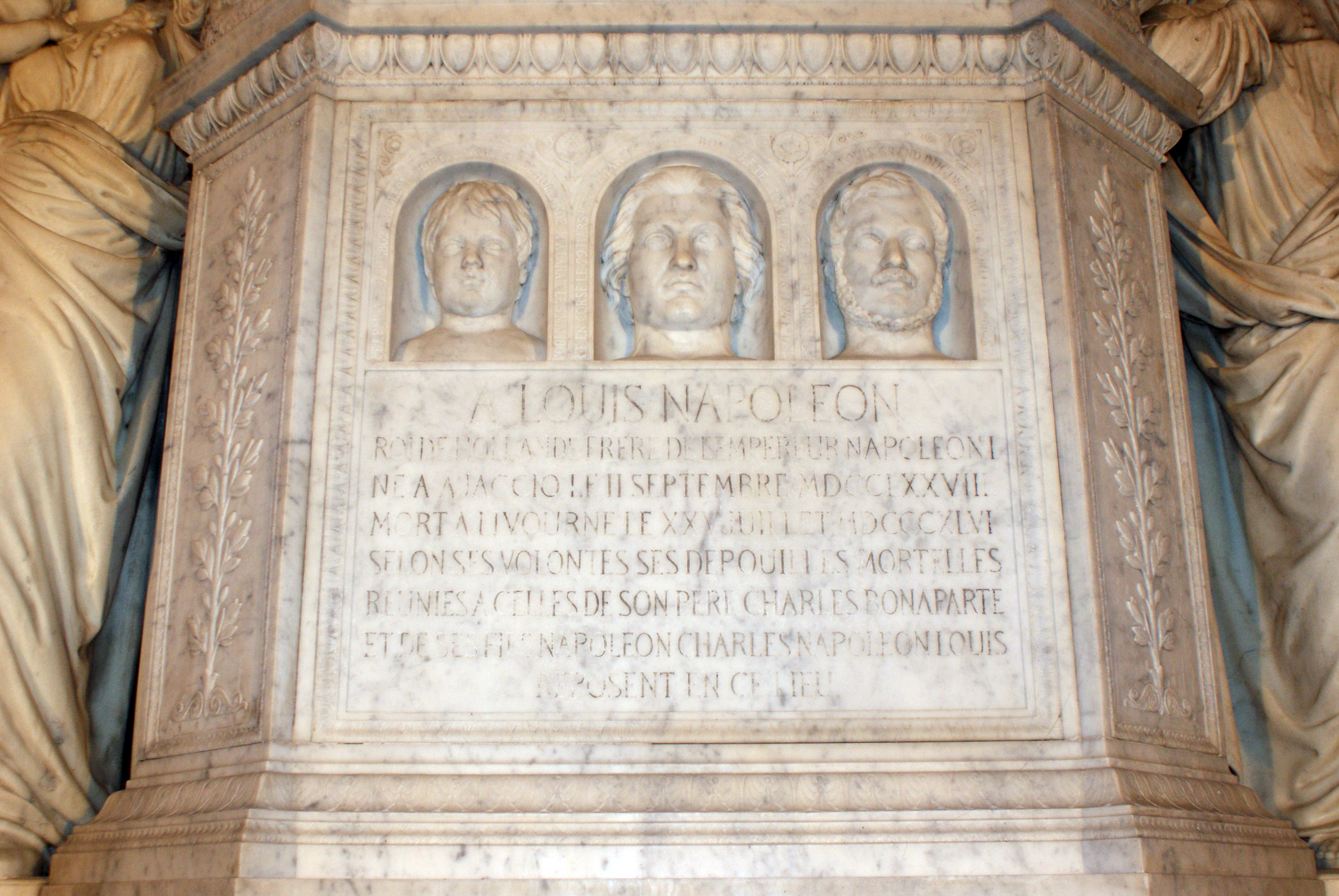
Tomb Lodewijk Napoleon with the faces of Napoleon Charles Bonaparte, Napoleon Louis Bonaparte and Carlo
