= Louis Bonaparte =

King of Holland from 1806 to 1810

Louis I
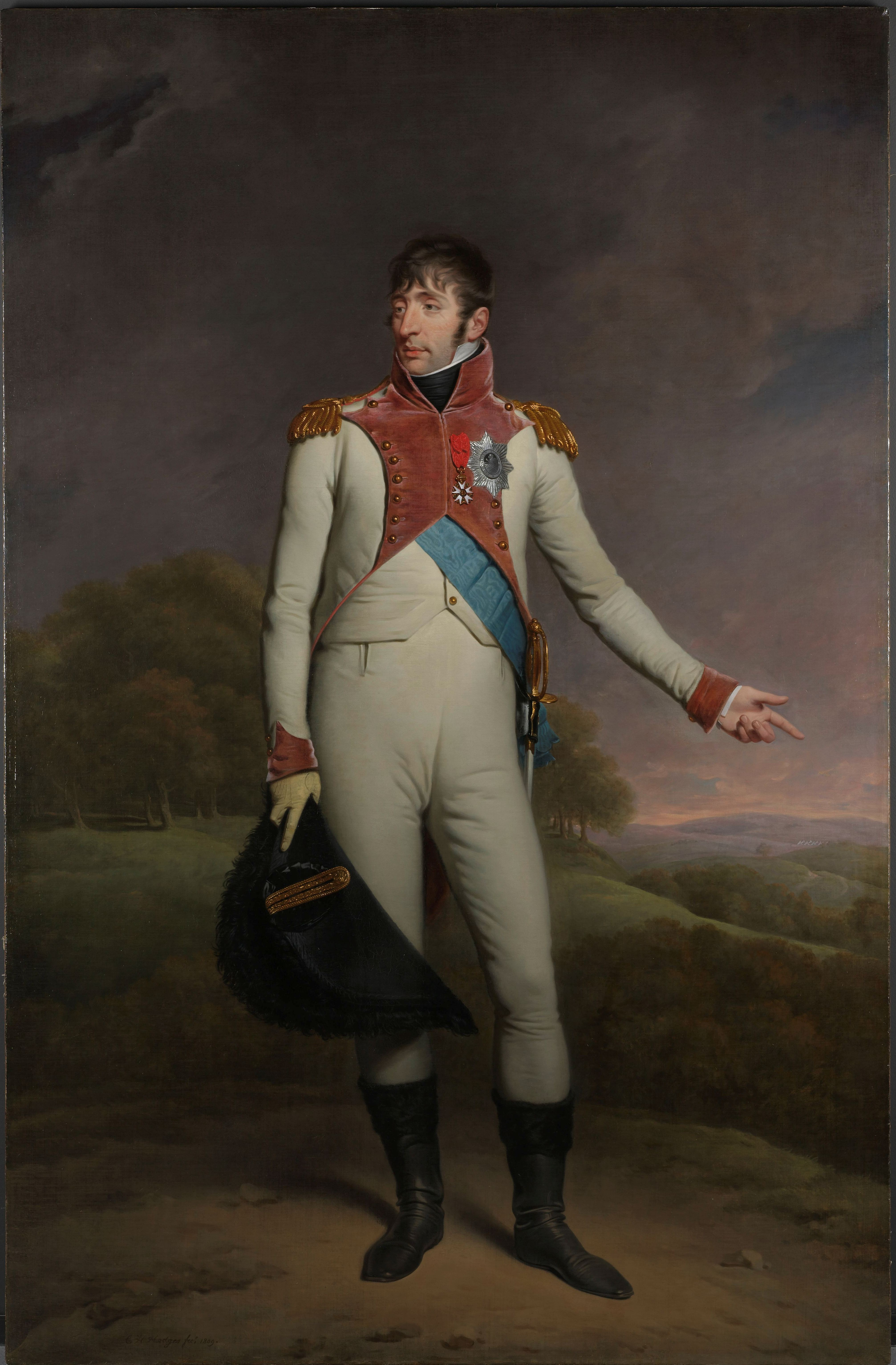
- Portrait of Louis Bonaparte (1809)

King of Holland
- Reign: 5 June 1806 – 1 July 1810
- Predecessor: Monarchy established (Rutger Jan Schimmelpenninck as Grand pensionary of the Batavian Commonwealth)
- Successor: Louis II

Head of the House of Bonaparte
- Tenure: 28 July 1844 – 25 July 1846
- Predecessor: Joseph, Count of Survilliers
- Successor: Napoleon III
- Born: Luigi Buonaparte; 2 September 1778; Ajaccio, Corsica, Kingdom of France
- Died: 25 July 1846 (aged 67); Livorno, Grand Duchy of Tuscany
- Burial: Église Saint-Leu-Saint Gilles, Saint-Leu-la-Forêt, Paris
- Spouse: Hortense de Beauharnais (m. 1802; died 1837)
- Issue: Napoléon-Charles; Napoléon-Louis; Napoleon III, Emperor of the French
- House: Bonaparte
- Father: Carlo Buonaparte
- Mother: Letizia Ramolino

Louis Bonaparte (born Luigi Buonaparte; 2 September 1778 – 25 July 1846) was a younger brother of Napoleon I, Emperor of the French. He was a monarch in his own right from 1806 to 1810, ruling over the Kingdom of Holland (a French client state roughly corresponding to the modern-day Netherlands). In that capacity, he was known as Louis I (Dutch: Lodewijk I [ˈloːdəʋɛik]).

Louis was the fifth surviving child and fourth surviving son of Carlo Buonaparte and Letizia Ramolino, out of eight children who lived past infancy. He and his siblings were all born in Corsica, which had been conquered by France less than a decade before his birth. Louis followed his older brothers into the French Army, where he benefited from Napoleon's patronage. In 1802, he married his step-niece Hortense de Beauharnais, the daughter of Empress Joséphine (Napoleon's wife).

In 1806, Napoleon I established the Kingdom of Holland in place of the Batavian Commonwealth, appointing Louis as the new king. Napoleon had intended for Holland to be little more than a puppet state, but Louis was determined to be as independent as possible and became quite popular amongst his new people. Growing tired of his brother's wilfulness, Napoleon annexed Holland into the French Empire in 1810, and Louis went into exile.

His youngest son, Louis-Napoléon, established the Second French Empire in 1852, proclaiming himself Napoleon III.

== Early life ==
Louis was born in Ajaccio, Corsica. He was a younger brother of Joseph, Napoleon, Lucien, and Elisa Bonaparte, and the older brother of Pauline, Caroline, and Jérôme Bonaparte. Louis' godparents were the island's governor, Mr de Marbeuf, and the wife of the intendant, Bertrand de Boucheporn, whom Letizia and her husband, Carlo, had befriended.

Louis Bonaparte's early career was spent in the Army, and he served with Napoleon in the French campaign in Egypt and Syria. Thanks to his older brother, Napoleon, Louis was given a commission in the French Military, and was promoted to Lieutenant in the 4th Artillery Regiment, and from there he was made Aide-de-Camp on Napoleon's staff. Napoleon, during his Italian Campaign, recommended Louis to Carnot, and Louis was consequently made a captain. He later became a General by the age of 25, although he felt that he had risen too high in too short a time.

Upon Louis's return to France, he was involved in Napoleon's plot to overthrow the Directory. After becoming the First Consul, Napoleon arranged for a marriage between Louis and Hortense de Beauharnais, the daughter of Empress Josephine, and hence Napoleon's stepdaughter. Hortense was opposed to the marriage at first. She was soon persuaded by her mother to marry Louis for the sake of the family.

== King of Holland (1806–1810) ==
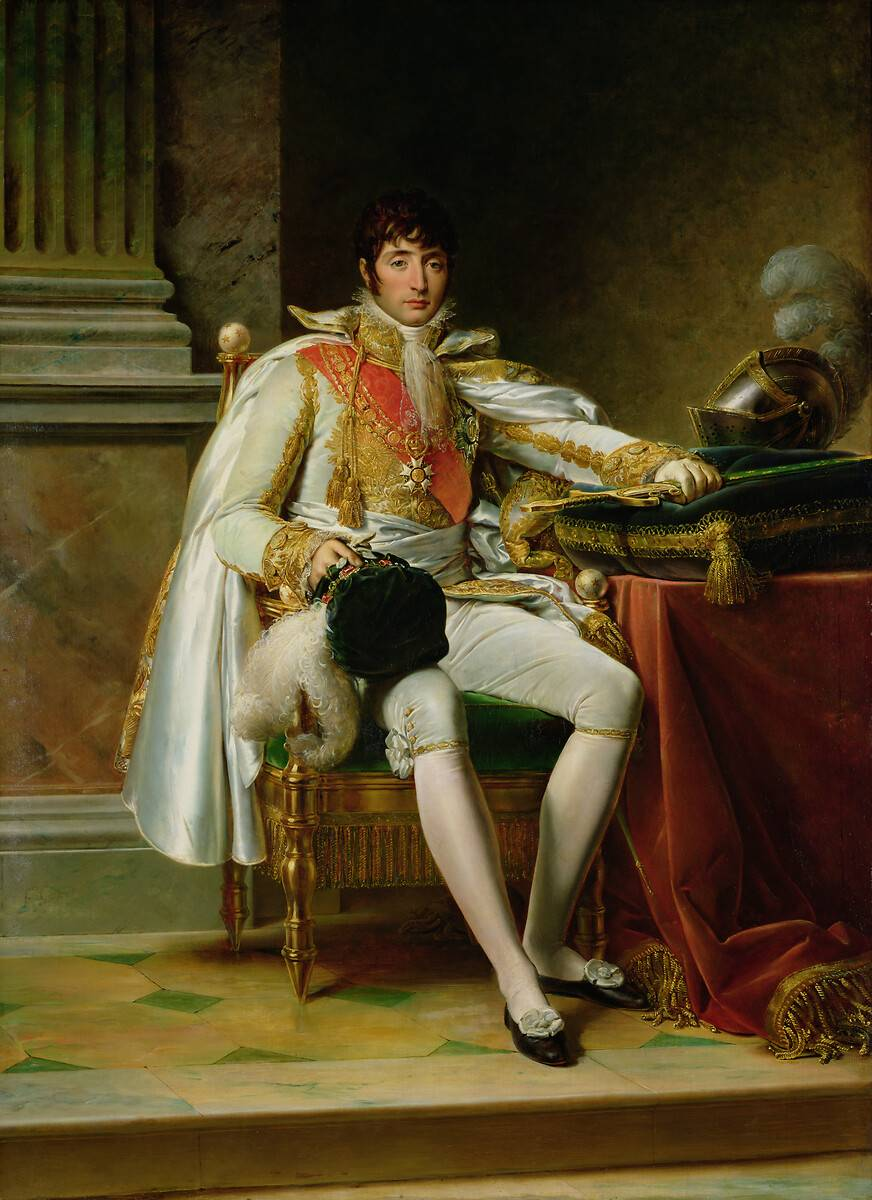
Louis Bonaparte, Constable of the Empire by François Gérard, 1806

Feeling that the Batavian Commonwealth was too independent for his liking, Napoleon I replaced it with the Kingdom of Holland on 5 June 1806 and placed Louis on the throne. Napoleon had intended for his younger brother to be little more than a French prefect of Holland. However, Louis had his own mind and tried to be a responsible and independent ruler. To endear himself to his adopted country, he tried to learn the Dutch language; he called himself Lodewijk I (adopting the Dutch form of his name) and declared himself Dutch rather than French. Allegedly, his Dutch was initially so poor that he told the people he was the Konijn van 'Olland ("Rabbit of 'Olland"), rather than Koning van Holland ("King of Holland"). However, his sincere effort to learn Dutch earned him respect from his subjects.

Having declared himself Dutch, Louis tried to make his court Dutch as well. He forced his court and ministers (mostly provided by Napoleon) to speak only Dutch and to renounce their French citizenships. This latter was too much for his wife Hortense who, in France at the time of his demands, refused his request. Louis and Hortense had never gotten along, and this demand further strained their relationship. She only came to Holland reluctantly and deliberately tried to avoid Louis as much as possible.

Louis could never settle on the location of his capital city while he was in Holland. He changed capitals over a dozen times, trying Amsterdam, The Hague, Utrecht, and other places. On one occasion, after visiting the home of a wealthy Dutch merchant, he liked the place so much that he had the owner evicted so he could take up residence there. Then, Louis moved again after seven weeks. His constant moving kept the court in upheaval since they had to follow him everywhere. The European diplomatic corps went so far as to petition Bonaparte to remain in one place so they could keep up with him.

Hortense bore Louis's sons Napoléon-Charles Bonaparte and Napoléon Louis Bonaparte in Paris, while Louis was in Holland. In 1806, Louis called for his son to be sent to him in Holland, but he was again refused by Hortense, who believed that her son would never be returned to France. When Louis appealed to his brother Napoleon for help, Napoleon sided with Hortense. Napoleon kept the boy in his court, and he even had him named the heir to the French throne before the birth of his son.

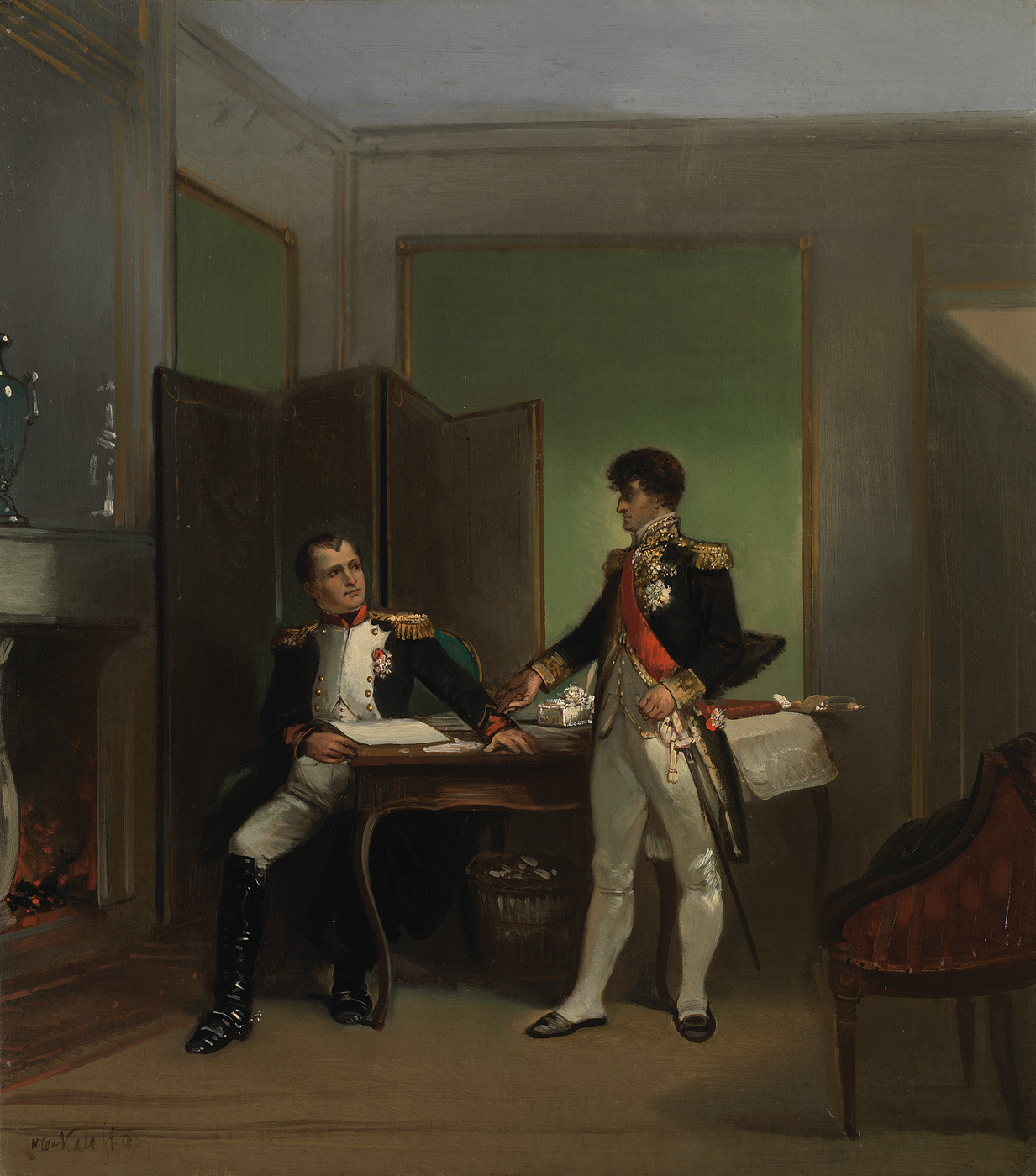
Louis defends Dutch independence against Napoleon. Painted by ten Kate

Two major tragedies occurred during the reign of Louis Bonaparte: the explosion of a cargo ship loaded with gunpowder in the heart of the city of Leiden in 1807, and a major flood in Holland in 1809. In both instances, Louis personally and effectively oversaw local relief efforts, which helped earn him the title of Louis the Good. Napoleon appeared disappointed and commented: "Brother, when they say of some king or other that he is good, it means that he has failed in his rule."

Louis Bonaparte's reign was short-lived due to two factors. The first was that Napoleon wanted to reduce the value of French loans from Dutch investors by two-thirds, meaning a serious economic blow to the Netherlands. The second became the pretext for Napoleon's demand of Louis's abdication. As Napoleon was preparing an army for his invasion of Russia, he wanted troops from the entire region under his control, this included troops from the Netherlands. Louis, confronted by his brother's demand, refused point-blank. Napoleon then accused Louis of putting Dutch interests above those of France, and removed most of the French forces in Holland for the coming war in the east, leaving only about 9,000 garrison soldiers in the country. Unfortunately for Louis, the British landed an army of 40,000 in 1809 in an attempt to capture Antwerp and Flushing. With Louis unable to defend his realm, France sent 80,000 militiamen, commanded by Maréchal d'Empire The 1st Prince Bernadotte, the future King Karl XIV Johan of Sweden, and successfully repelled the invasion. Napoleon then suggested that Louis should abdicate, citing Louis's inability to protect Holland as a reason. Louis refused and declared the occupation of the Kingdom by a French army as unlawful. On 1 July 1810, Louis abdicated in favour of his second son, Napoleon Louis Bonaparte. He fled from Haarlem on 2/3 July and settled in Austria. Marshal Nicolas Oudinot invaded Holland on 4 July. Napoleon incorporated Holland into France by the Decree of Rambouillet on 9 July.

== Exile ==
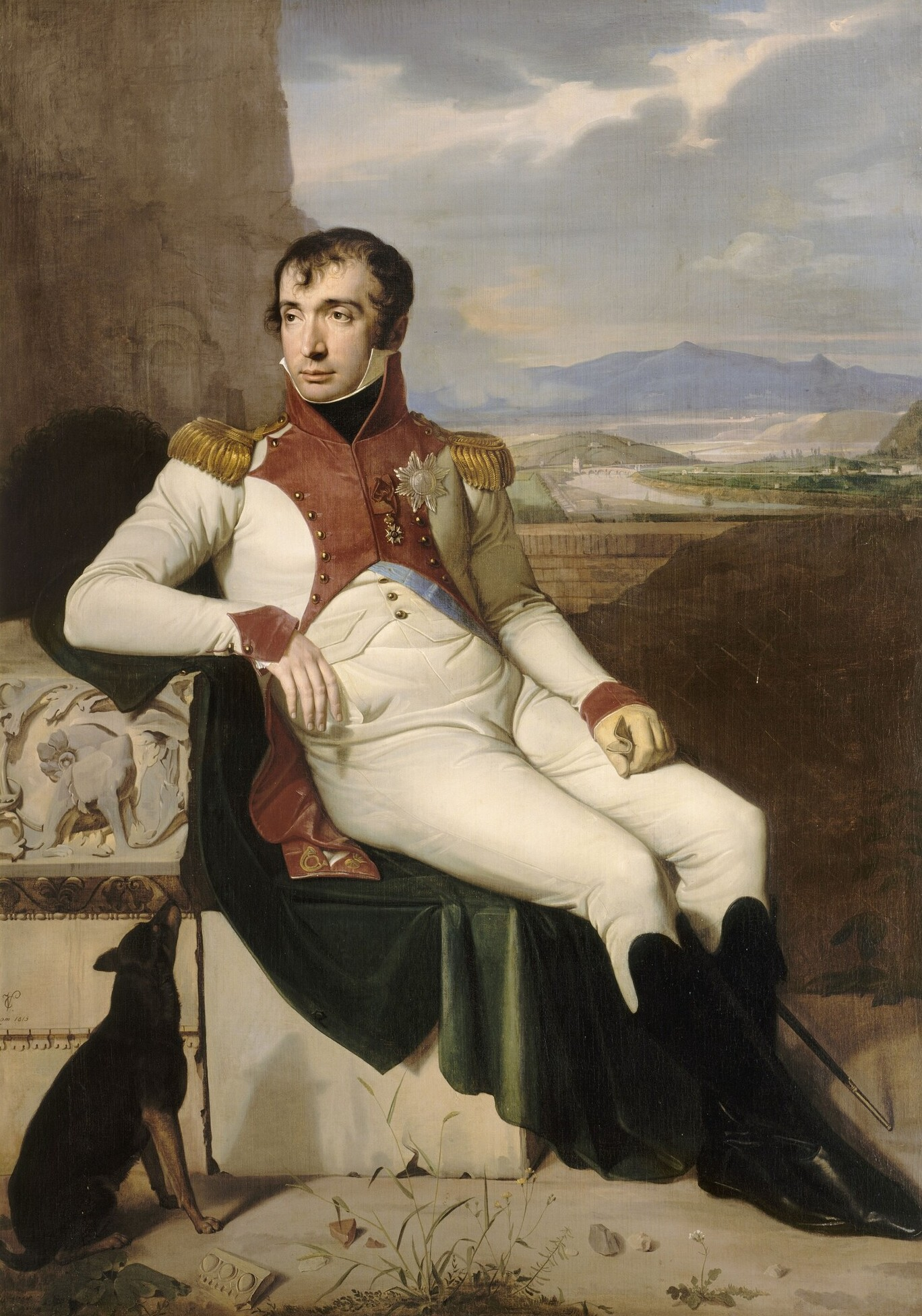
Portrait of Louis Bonaparte in Rome after his abdication, wearing the uniform of a Dutch cavalry general (Carl Christian Vogel von Vogelstein, c. 1813)

After his abdication, Louis Bonaparte assumed the title of Count of Saint-Leu (comte de Saint-Leu), which was a reference to his property at Saint-Leu-la-Forêt near Paris. He was appointed as the Constable of France in 1808, a strictly honorary title.

After his Dutch kingdom was taken away from him, the Austrian Emperor Francis I offered him asylum. Between 1811 and 1813, he found refuge in Graz, where he turned to writing and poetry. Louis wrote to Napoleon after the latter's defeat in Russia to request that the Dutch throne be restored to him; however, Napoleon refused. His request to visit the Netherlands was denied several times by King William I of the Netherlands, but King William II allowed him a visit in 1840. Although traveling in the Netherlands under a false name, some people found out that it was their former king, which led to a cheering crowd gathering under the window of his hotel room. It is said that he was quite moved by this demonstration of affection from his former subjects.

After the death of his eldest brother Joseph in 1844, Louis was seen by the Bonapartists as the rightful Emperor of the French, although Louis took little action himself to advance the claim. Louis's son and heir, the future Emperor Napoleon III, on the other hand, was at that time being imprisoned in France for having attempted a Bonapartist coup d'état against King Louis Philippe I.

Louis Bonaparte died from stroke on 25 July 1846 in Livorno, and his remains were buried at Saint-Leu-la-Forêt, Île-de-France.

== Marriage and children ==
Louis was married on 4 January 1802 to Hortense de Beauharnais, the daughter of the deceased general Alexandre, Vicomte de Beauharnais, and his wife Josephine Tascher de la Pagerie. Josephine was the first wife of Louis's brother Napoleon. Thus Hortense was also Louis's step-niece.

This marriage had been forced upon them and was rather loveless, though they supposedly consummated it and interacted often enough to produce three sons. As a rule, the Bonapartes, except Napoleon, loathed the Beauharnaises. Hortense also certainly had extra-marital lovers.

Hortense de Beauharnais gave birth to three sons who were officially claimed by Louis Bonaparte, despite his doubts about their paternity:

1. Napoleon Charles Bonaparte, born 10 October 1802, Prince Royal of Holland. When he died on 5 May 1807 at 4½ years of age, his body lay in state at Notre Dame Cathedral in Paris. He is buried at Saint-Leu-La-Foret, Ile-de-France.
2. Napoleon Louis Bonaparte, born 11 October 1804. Became Prince Royal of Holland on his brother's death, and was King for eight days in 1810, between his father's abdication (1 July) and the fall of Holland to Napoleon Bonaparte's invading army (9 July). Sovereign of the Grand Duchy of Berg in 1809-1813 (under regency). Napoleon Louis Bonaparte died from measles on 17 March 1831, and his remains were buried at Saint-Leu-La-Foret, Île-de-France.
3. Charles Louis-Napoleon Bonaparte, (1808–73). Born in Paris, he was the third and last son, and became Sovereign of the Second French Empire (1852–1870) as Emperor Napoleon III.

== See also ==
- List of Corsican people

Louis Bonaparte House of Bonaparte Born: 2 September 1778 Died: 25 July 1846
Regnal titles
| New title | King of Holland; 5 June 1806 – 1 July 1810 | Succeeded by Louis II |
Titles in pretence
| Preceded by Joseph I | — TITULAR — Emperor of the French; King of Italy; 28 July 1844 – 25 July 1846 | Succeeded by Napoleon III |
