= Partant pour la Syrie =

Anthem of the Second French Empire (1852–1870)

English: 'Leaving for Syria'
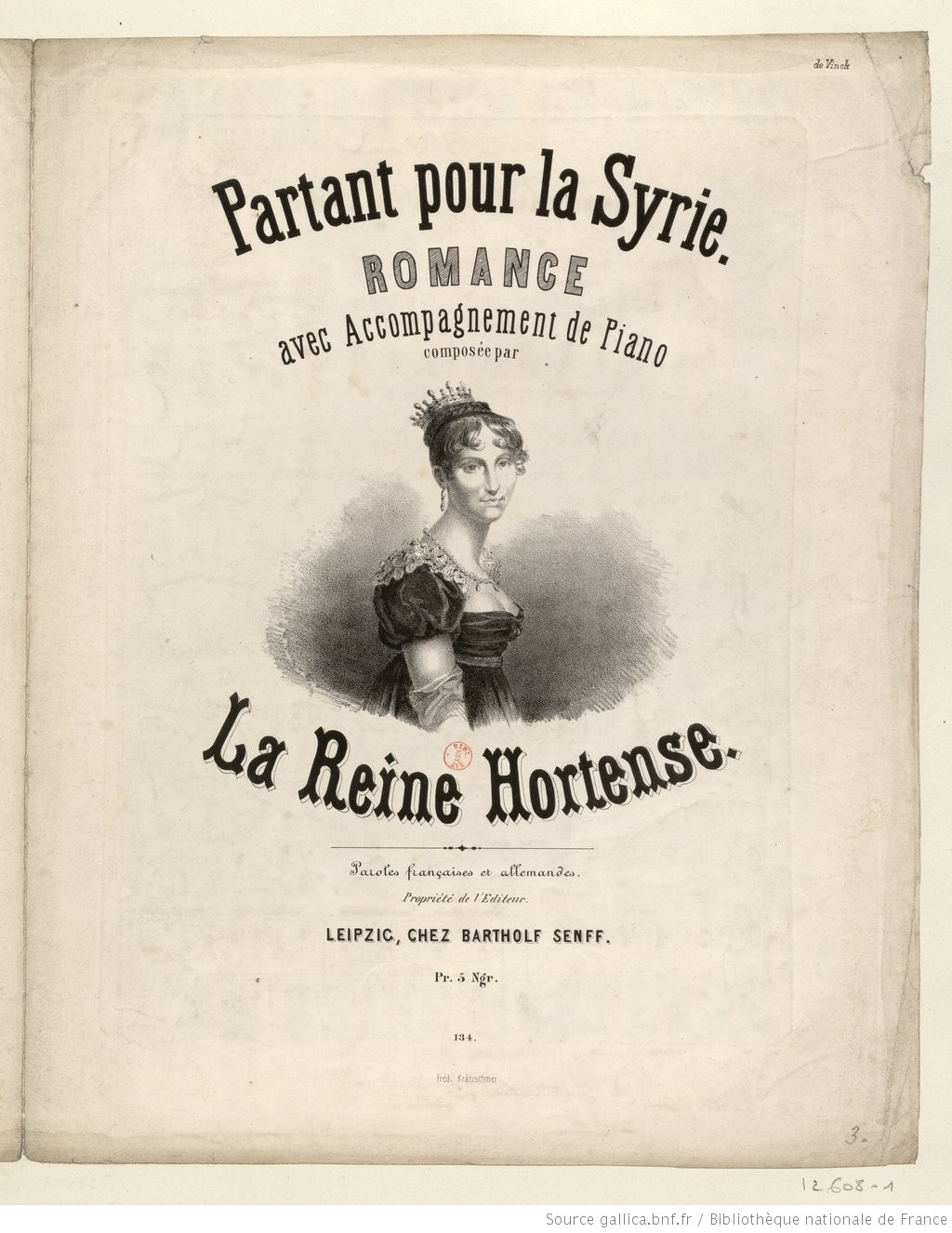
- 19th century cover
- Former de facto anthem of France
- Also known as: Le beau Dunois
- Lyrics: Alexandre de Laborde
- Music: Hortense de Beauharnais, 1807
- Adopted: 1852
- Relinquished: 1870

Audio sample
- Partant pour la Syrie, instrumental: file; help

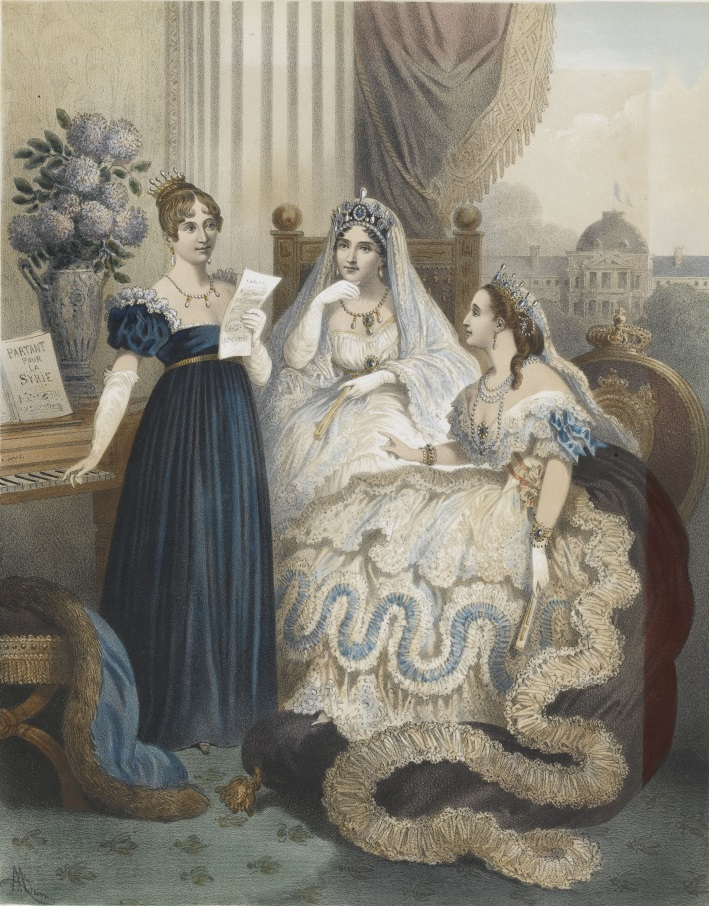
Fictional scene of Queen Hortense singing "Partant pour la Syrie" before Empress Joséphine and Empress Eugénie.

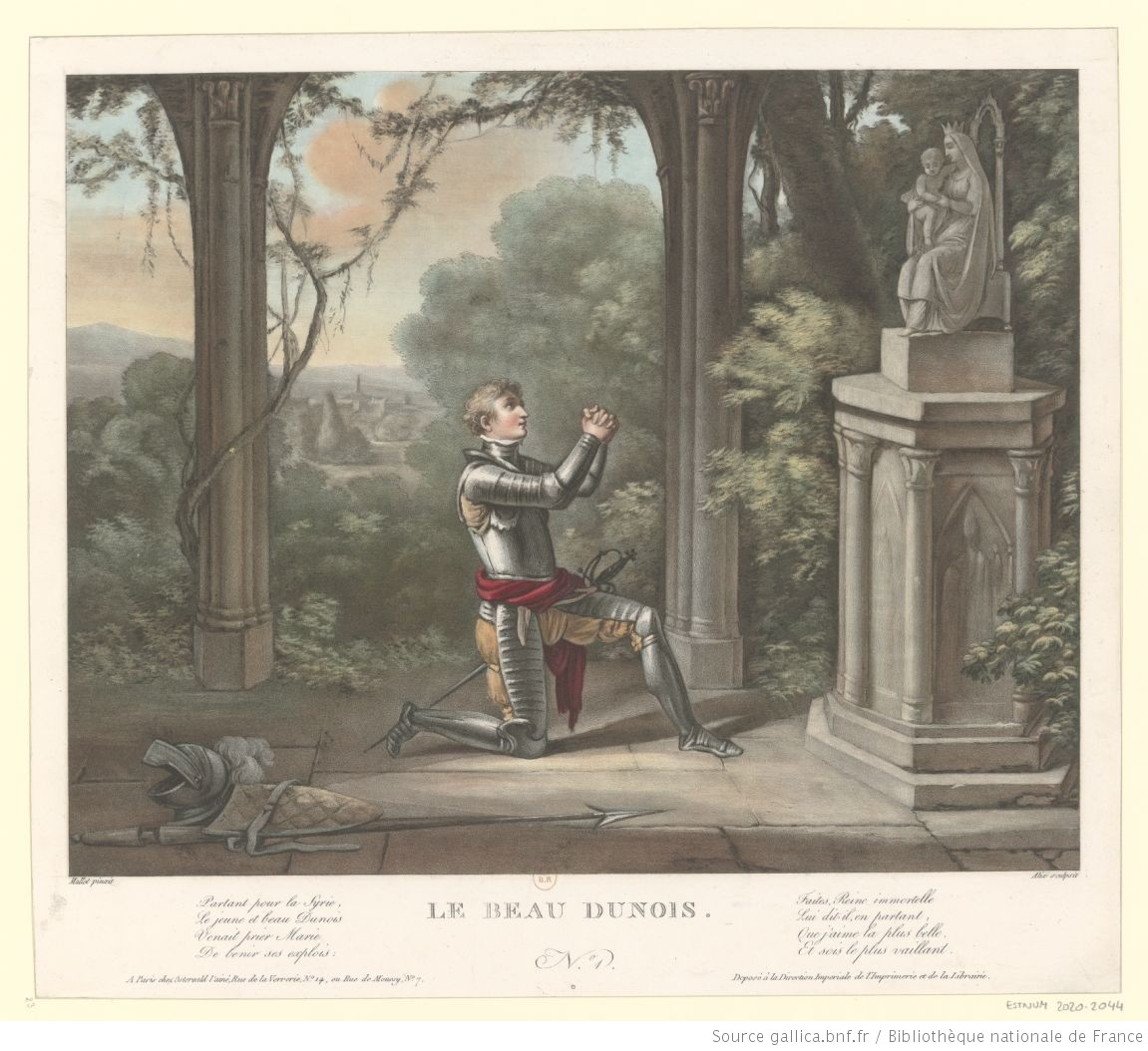
Illustration of Dunois at prayer.

"Partant pour la Syrie" (French: [paʁtɑ̃ puʁ la siʁi]; lit. 'Leaving for Syria') was the de facto national anthem of the Second French Empire, used between 1852 and 1870. The music was composed by Hortense de Beauharnais, and the lyrics were written by Alexandre de Laborde, in or around 1807.

== Background ==
The song was inspired by Napoleon I's campaign in Egypt and Syria. It represents a chivalric composition of the aspirations of a crusader knight in a style typical of the First French Empire. Hortense (Napoleon I's stepdaughter and the mother of Napoleon III) indicated in her Memoires that she wrote the music when she lived at Malmaison. During its popularity in the 19th century, the song was arranged for numerous instruments by various composers.

The poem by Laborde was originally titled Le beau Dunois, telling the story of the handsome crusader Dunois. Prior to his departure to Syria, he prays to the Virgin Mary that he will love the most beautiful woman and that he himself may be the bravest, and his prayers are answered. On his return, the brave warrior wins the hand of Isabelle, the daughter of his liege lord, and love and honor prevail.

== Popularity ==
The song was popular during the remainder of the First Empire, with Hortense in her exile at Arenenberg, and with the Bonapartists during the Bourbon Restoration. "Partant pour la Syrie" was the unofficial national anthem during the Second Empire, an era when "La Marseillaise" was regarded with suspicion. After the collapse of the Second Empire, the song was played to the Emperor Napoleon III as he departed from Schloss Wilhelmshöhe to his exile in England in 1871, but by the time of Empress Eugénie's funeral in 1920, the band did not know it and played "La Marseillaise" instead. "Partant pour la Syrie" did, however, achieve a posthumous fame as one of the quoted tunes in "Fossils" from Camille Saint-Saëns's Carnival of the Animals, written in 1886 but not published until 1922.

It remains part of the repertoire of French military music.

== Lyrics ==
French original

I
Partant pour la Syrie,
Le jeune et beau Dunois,
Venait prier Marie
De bénir ses exploits :
Faites, Reine immortelle,
Lui dit-il en partant,
Que j'aime la plus belle
Et sois le plus vaillant.

II
Il trace sur la pierre
Le serment de l'honneur,
Et va suivre à la guerre
Le Comte son seigneur ;
Au noble vœu fidèle,
Il dit en combattant :
Amour à la plus belle,
Honneur au plus vaillant.

III
On lui doit la Victoire.
Vraiment, dit le seigneur ;
Puisque tu fais ma gloire
Je ferai ton bonheur.
De ma fille Isabelle,
Sois l'Epoux à l'instant,
Car elle est la plus belle,
Et toi le plus vaillant.

IV
A l'Autel de Marie,
Ils contractent tous deux
Cette union Chérie
Qui seule rend heureux.
Chacun dans la chapelle
Disait en les voyant :
Amour à la plus belle,
Honneur au plus vaillant.

English translation

I
Leaving for Syria,
The young and handsome Dunois
Went to ask the Virgin Mary,
His heroic deeds to bless,
Make it so, immortal Queen
He said on his leaving,
"I love the most gorgeous
And be the bravest."

II
On stone he writeth
The oath of honour
And into war followeth
The count, his Lord.
Faithful to his noble vow,
He said while fighting,
"Love to the most gorgeous,
Honour to the bravest."

III
We owe thee the victory
Truly! saith the Lord,
Since thou hast established my glory,
I shall make thee happy!
My daughter Isabelle
Will be thy wife
For she is the most gorgeous
And thou the bravest.

IV
At the altar of Mary,
They pledged both
This dear union
Which alone bringeth happiness.
Everyone in the chapel
Said seeing them,
"Love to the most gorgeous,
Honour to the bravest."
