= Hortense de Beauharnais =

Queen of Holland from 1806 to 1810

- Duchess of Saint-Leu
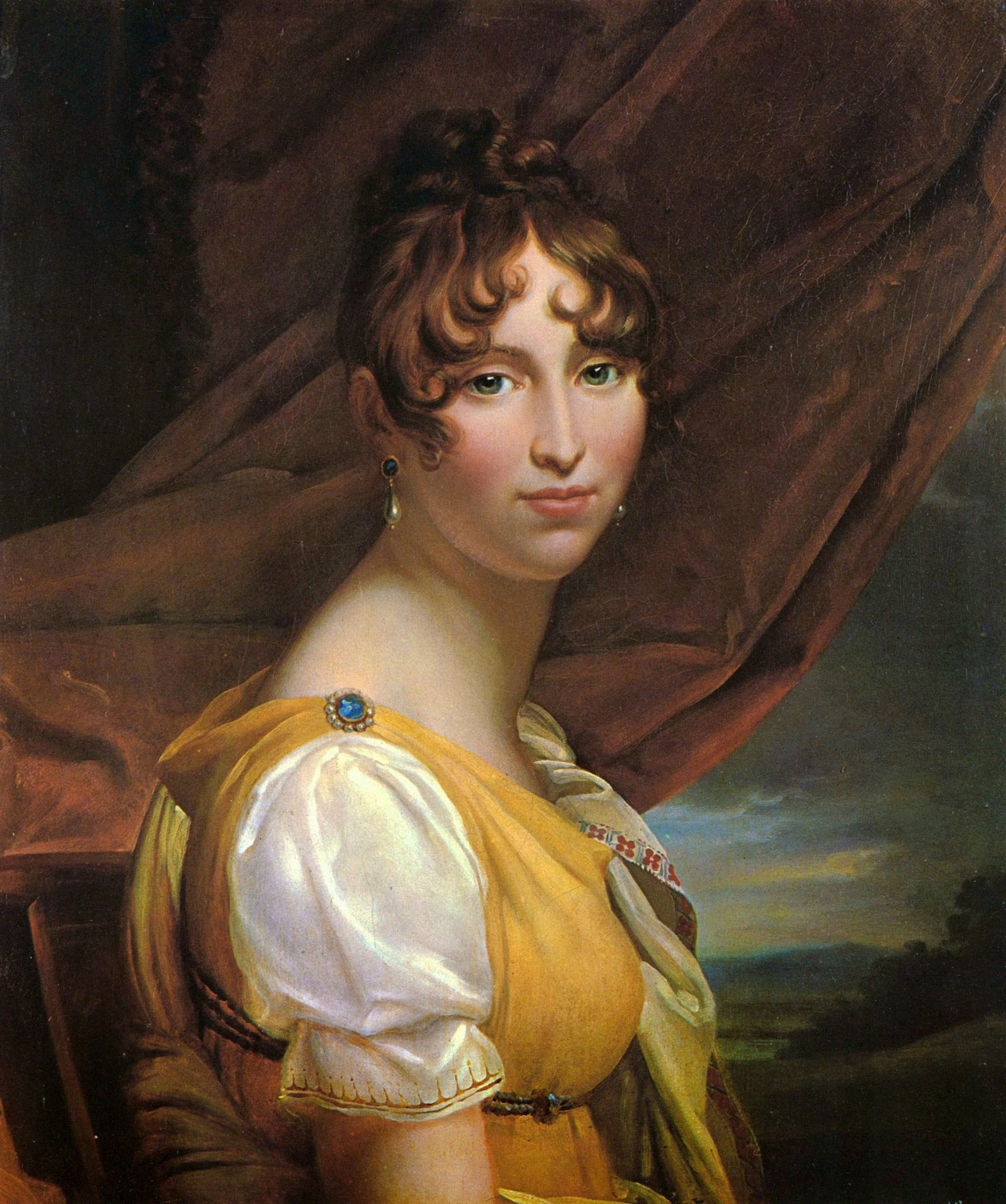
- Portrait by François Gérard, c. 1800–10

Queen consort of Holland
- Tenure: 5 June 1806 – 1 July 1810
- Born: 10 April 1783; Paris, France
- Died: 5 October 1837 (aged 54); Arenenberg, Thurgau, Switzerland
- Burial: St Pierre-St Paul Church, Rueil-Malmaison, France
- Spouse: Louis Bonaparte (m. 1802)
- Issue: Napoléon-Charles; Napoléon-Louis; Napoleon III; Charles, Duc de Morny (ill.)
- House: Beauharnais
- Father: Alexandre de Beauharnais
- Mother: Joséphine Tascher de la Pagerie

Royal styles of Queen Hortense of Holland
- Reference style: Her Majesty
- Spoken style: Your Majesty

Hortense Eugénie Cécile Bonaparte (French pronunciation: [ɔʁtɑ̃s øʒeni sesil bɔnapaʁt]; née de Beauharnais, pronounced [də boaʁnɛ]; 10 April 1783 – 5 October 1837) was Queen of Holland as the wife of King Louis Bonaparte. She was the stepdaughter of Emperor Napoléon I as the daughter of his first wife, Joséphine de Beauharnais. Hortense later married Napoléon I's brother, Louis, making her Napoleon's sister-in-law. She became queen consort of Holland when Louis was made King of Holland in 1806. She and Louis had three sons: Napoléon-Charles Bonaparte; Napoleon III, Emperor of the French; and Napoléon Louis Bonaparte (titular King Louis II of Holland). She also had an illegitimate son, Charles, Duc de Morny, with her lover, the Comte de Flahaut.

== Early life ==
Hortense Eugénie Cécile Bonaparte was born in Paris, France, on 10 April 1783. She was born as the second child and first daughter to Alexandre François Marie, Vicomte de Beauharnais, and Joséphine Tascher de la Pagerie. Alexandre assumed her legal paternity, but when Joséphine announced him the birth of Hortense he wrote her that he knew for certain that baby was the result of adultery. Her parents separated when she was five years old and, between the ages of five and ten, she was sent to live in Martinique. Her father was executed on 23 July 1794, at the time of the French Revolution, a few days before the end of the Reign of Terror. Her mother was imprisoned in the Carmelites’ prison, from which she was released on 6 August 1794, due to the intervention of her friend Thérèse Tallien. Two years later, her mother married Napoléon Bonaparte.

Hortense was described as having been an amusing and pretty child with long, pale golden-blonde hair and blue eyes. She received her education at the school of Madame Jeanne Campan in St-Germain-en-Laye together with Napoléon's youngest sister Caroline Bonaparte, who later married Joachim Murat. She was sent to boarding school when her mother, Josephine, decided that she did not have enough time to raise children. There, she developed a love for fine art and music. Hortense was an accomplished amateur musical composer and supplied the army of her stepfather with rousing marches, including Partant pour la Syrie. She also enjoyed playing games and excelled at billiards particularly.

In 1802, at Napoléon's request, Hortense married his brother Louis Bonaparte. Hortense was reluctant to marry at first, but her mother persuaded her to accept the proposal for the political wellbeing and prosperity of the family.

== Queen of Holland ==
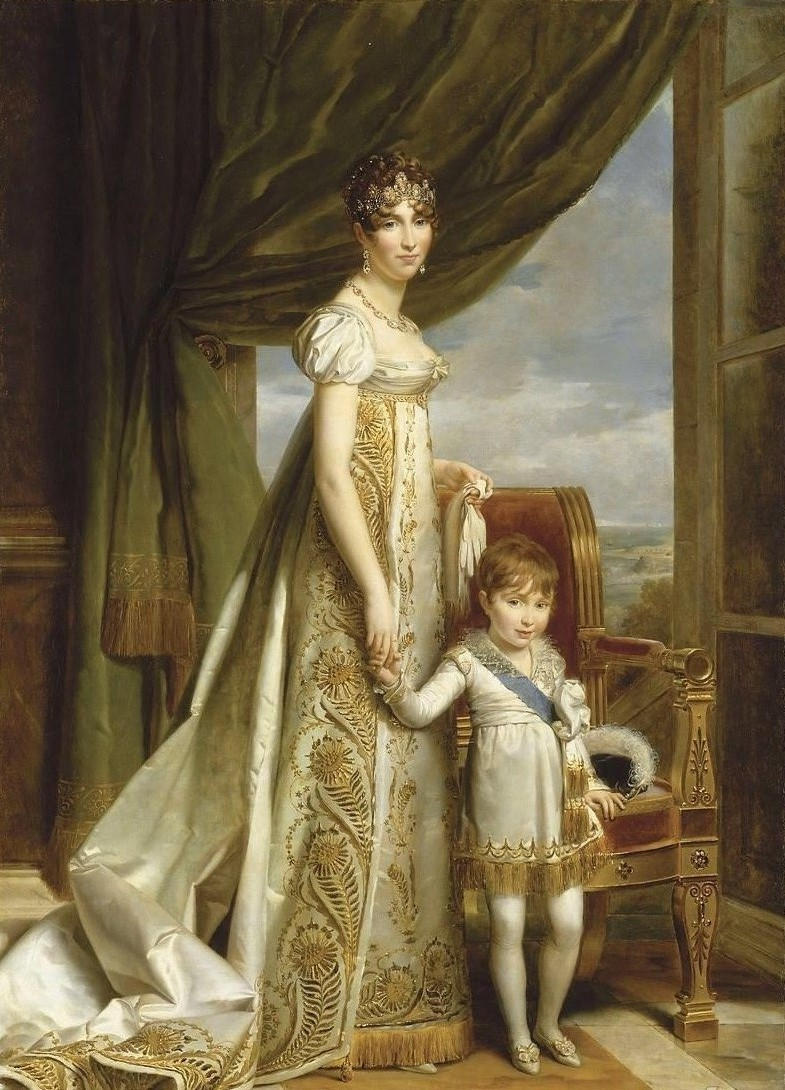
Portrait Hortense with her second son, Napoléon Louis, by François Gérard, 1807

Napoléon appointed his brother Louis as King of Holland in 1806 and Hortense accompanied her husband to The Hague. Hortense's reaction to her appointment as Queen of Holland was negative for two reasons. First, it was necessary for her to move there with Louis, with whom she did not get along. Second, she had to leave her life as a celebrated member of Parisian society. She had hoped to be "a Queen of Holland in Paris," but Napoléon did not agree. She was forced to depart to the Netherlands with Louis eventually, where she arrived on 18 June 1806.

Queen Hortense was pleasantly surprised when the Dutch public welcomed her warmly. She quickly became accustomed to life in the Netherlands and came to like the country. She attended official celebrations and ceremonies, visited the marketplaces where she made large purchases, and was much liked by the public, which annoyed her husband. She learned water-colour painting and made trips around the countryside. Nevertheless, she hated her stay there because of her relationship with King Louis. The couple lived in different parts of the palace and avoided each other at every opportunity, with Hortense describing herself as a prisoner. She also refused to give up her French citizenship and declare herself Dutch as Louis did.

In 1807 her first son died; she was allowed to stay in France subsequently, as the climate there was considered better for raising her other son Louis-Napoléon. She remained in France, again pleased by her status as a queen at the French court, until 1810, when Napoléon remarried to Marie Louise of Austria.

This forced Hortense to return to the Netherlands and reconcile with her husband. When Napoleon married Marie Louise, Hortense returned to the Netherlands temporarily, but found that the Dutch did not welcome her. She considered this the end of her marriage and left for France shortly before her husband abdicated the throne to their oldest living son, Napoléon Louis Bonaparte, making him Louis II of Holland.

== Personal life ==
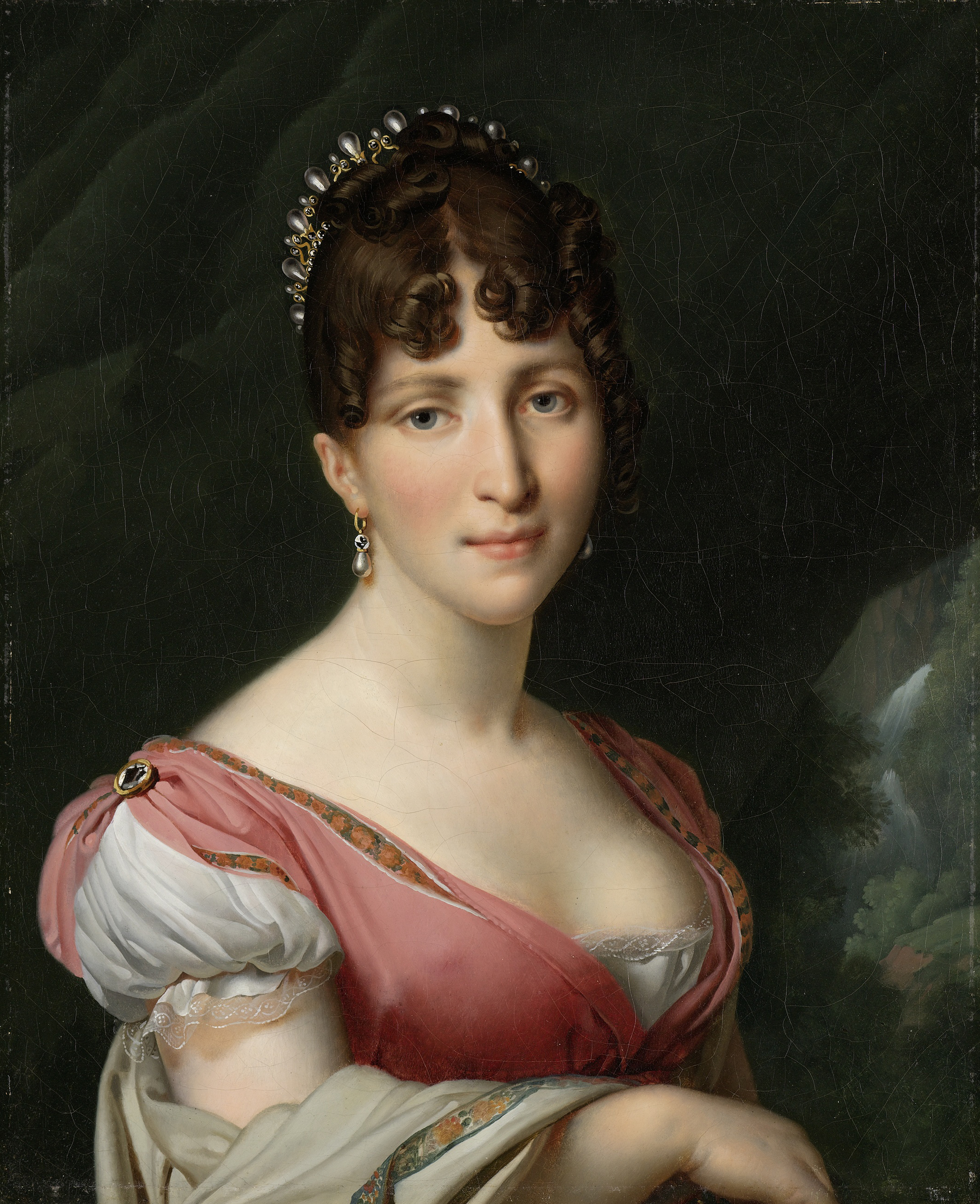
Hortense in 1808 (portrait by Anne-Louis Girodet-Trioson)

Hortense was now free to respond to the romantic overtures of the man whom she had long admired, Colonel Charles Joseph, Comte de Flahaut, a sophisticated, handsome man, who was an illegitimate son of Talleyrand. They soon became lovers. In 1811, at an unspecified inn in Switzerland, close to Lake Geneva, Hortense gave birth to a son by Comte de Flahaut secretly, Charles Auguste Louis Joseph (21 October 1811 – 10 March 1865), created Duke of Morny by his half-brother, Napoléon III, in 1862.

Only her brother Eugène, her closest companions, and Adélaïde Filleul de Souza (Charles de Flahaut's mother) were aware of her pregnancy and the subsequent birth. She had used poor health to explain her prolonged visit to Switzerland, which Adélaïde arranged. Hortense disguised her pregnancy cleverly (she was, by then, in her sixth month) during the baptism of Napoléon's son, Napoleon II, when Napoléon I made her one of the child's godmothers, an honour she shared with Madame Mère, mother of the Emperor.

In 1814 Flahaut had an affair with the Comédie-Française actress Mademoiselle Mars. When Hortense read Mars’ "passionate outpourings" in one of her letters to Charles, she ended the affair. Although Hortense still had a deep attachment to Charles and remained in correspondence with him initially, she then made up her mind to release him. When, months later, he had mentioned that he had met "a rich young woman who seemed to like him,” Hortense begged him to forget the promises he had made to her. In October that year she went on a pilgrimage to the Benedictine shrine of Our Lady of the Hermits at Einsiedeln Abbey in the Swiss canton of Schwyz. After renouncing her claims on Charles, she presented a bouquet of diamond hydrangeas to the Virgin and a ring for the abbot, having been blessed, she wrote, with "so many consolations, such happiness at Einsiedeln not to wish that my memory remain there after I had left."

=== Composer ===
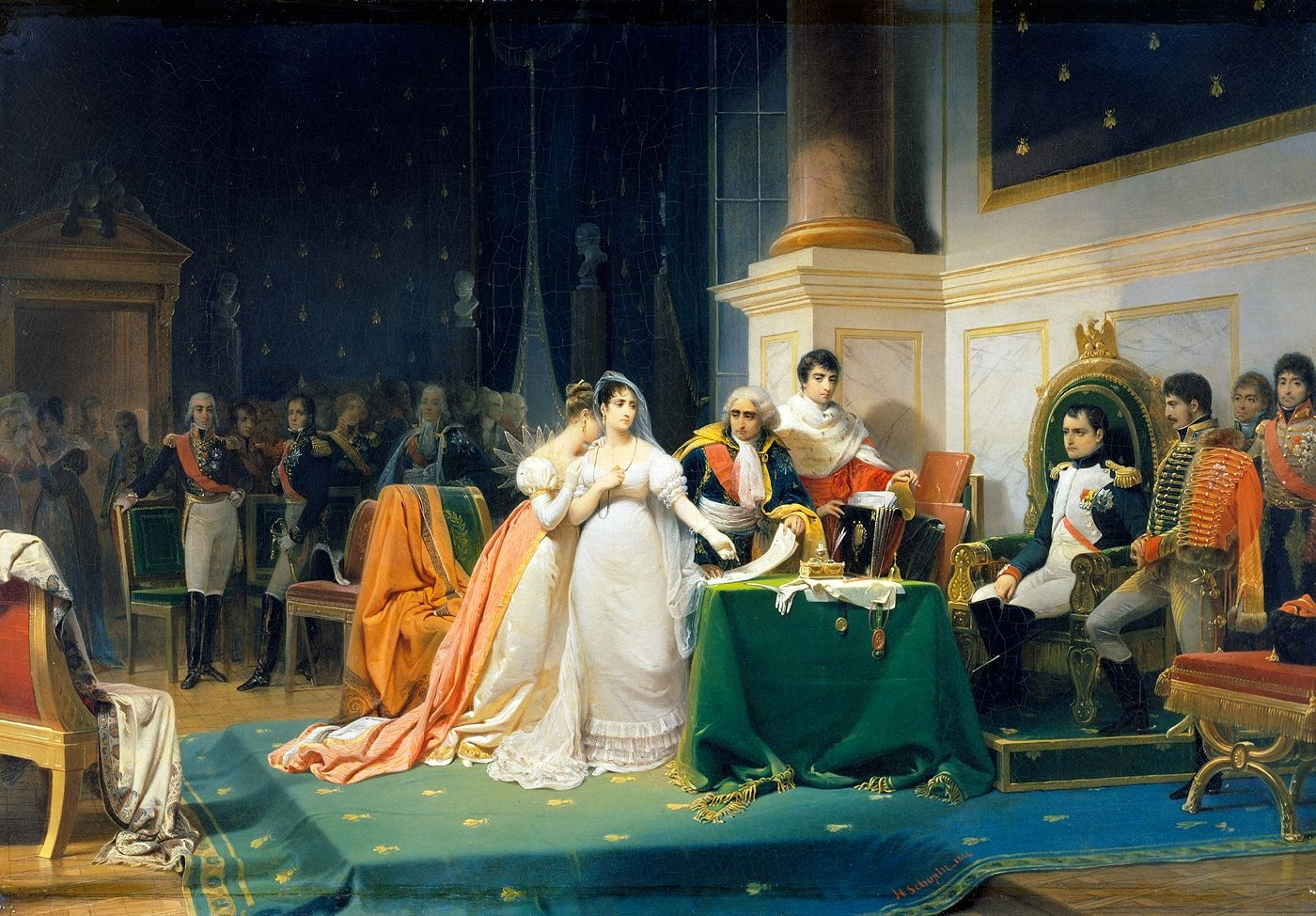
The Divorce of the Empress Josephine by Henri Frédéric Schopin, 1846. Hortense accompanies her mother for the signing of the official divorce from Napoleon in 1809.

Hortense de Beauharnais found love for music during her time in boarding school and she became a self-acclaimed amateur composer there. Though she did not have any known education in composition, it is said that she was a very talented singer and pianist. Fétis wrote about her in his article, Biographie Universelle des Musiciens, the following lines:

“Plantade was Queen Hortense’s singing-master when she was at Mad. Campan’s school; what her Majesty gained more especially from her lessons was a great capability of stint, she composed several pieces of this kind, among which is the one beginning with the words: ‘Partant pour la Syrie.’ This romance, which enjoyed a great vogue about 1810, again became popular in France after 1852.” While her stepfather, Napoleon, ruled over France, she wrote marches and the French Troops sung some of her songs.

Hortense was banished when Napoleon was defeated and there she wrote numerous pieces, mostly notably her 12 Romances she wrote for her brother Eugene. Although she was banished, Hortense’s home exemplified the spirit of French art culture. There she presented her arts for her many visitors. Famous contemporary artists like Franz Liszt, Alexandre Dumas, pere, and Lord Byron came to visit and listen to her piano performances. Hortense’s most famous composition ‘Partant pour la Syrie’ became the national hymn of France after her son Emperor Napoleon III instated it as such. French composer Camille Saint-Saens quotes “Partant pour la Syrie” in “Fossils” from his Carnival of the Animals.

A collection of some of her writing, art, and compositions can be found in her “Livre d’art de la reine Hortense.”

=== Charities ===
Hortense donated to the poor often and was also known to be a favourite amongst them. She states in her memoirs, “Going to one of the mulatto houseservants I announced, ‘John, look at all this money granny gave me for the poor black people. Take me round to their cabins so I can give it to them.’”

== Later years ==
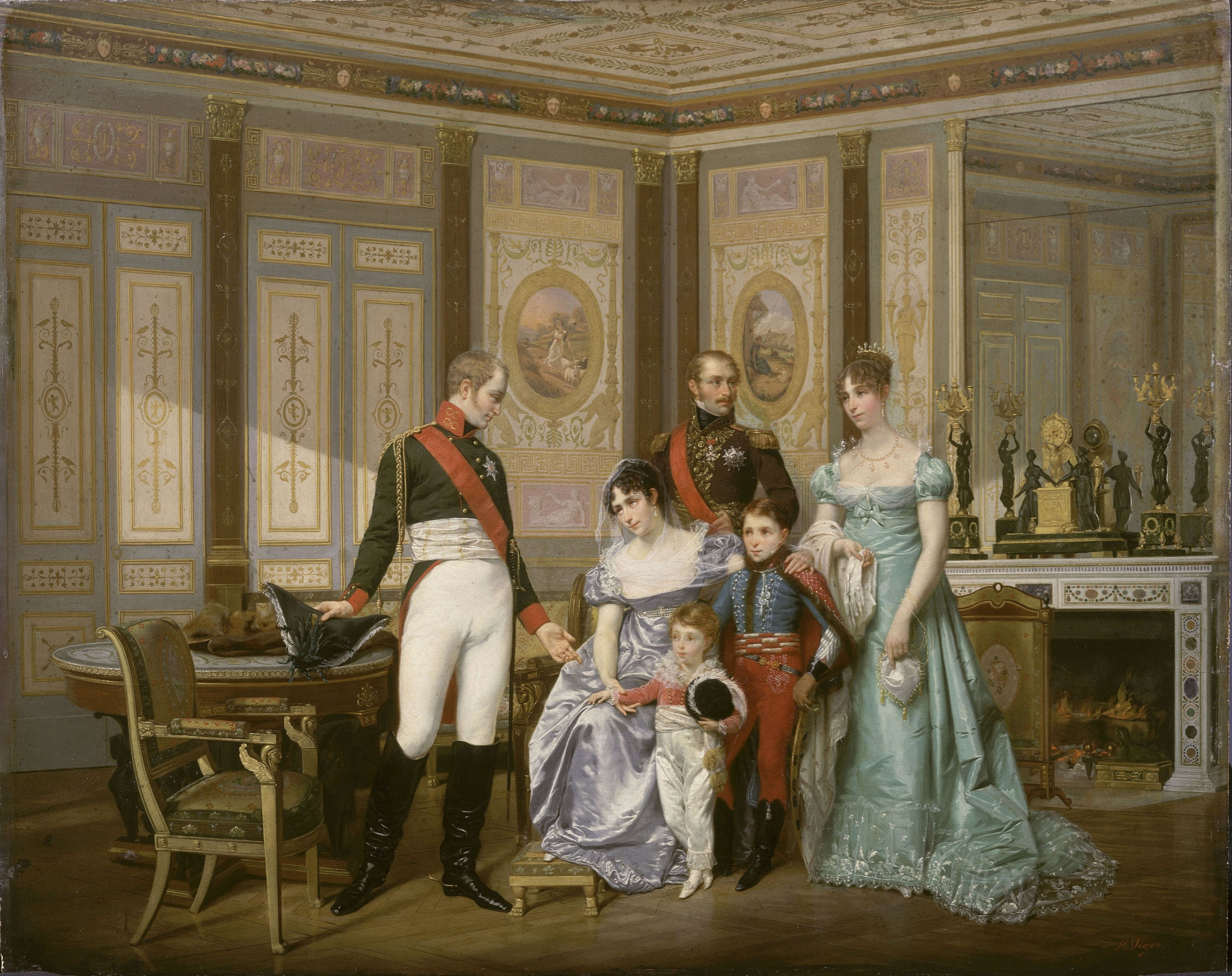
Hortense with her family and Alexander I of Russia at Château de Malmaison

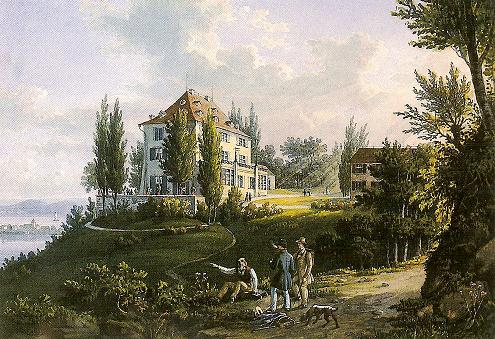
Arenenberg

At the Bourbon Restoration in 1814, Hortense received the protection of Alexander I of Russia. At his instigation, Louis XVIII granted her the title of Duchess of Saint-Leu (duchesse de Saint-Leu) on 30 May 1814. During the Hundred Days, however, Hortense supported her stepfather and brother-in-law Napoléon. In turn, Louis XVIII banished Hortense from France after Napoleon’s final defeat. She left Paris on 17 July 1815.

During her banishment, Hortense began to focus on writing her memoirs, composing and publishing her musical works, drawing, and painting. Her home became a meeting place for artists, composers, philosophes and nobles who supported the Bonapartes.

Despite residing in Switzerland, Hortense remained involved in her sons’ lives. When one of her sons, Napoleon-Louis (Louis II of Holland), died in the Italian revolt against Austrian rule, she and her youngest son Louis-Napoleon escaped to France in April 1831. They reached Paris later that month, where Hortense discreetly contacted the new King of the French Louis Philippe I asking for passports so that she and her son could travel on to England. Louis Philippe received her warmly at the Tuileries Palace and agreed to secure the passports. He told her that, for the time being, the Law of Exile against the Bonapartes would be upheld, assuring her that "the time is not too distant that there will be no more exiles." According to Maxime du Camp, who had access to official dossiers, during his mothers' interview with the king, Louis-Napoleon was observed by authorities meeting with a group of conspirators who were planning to stage a coup to overthrow Louis-Philippe and bring Napoleon II to power. Hortense and her son were both implicated in the scheme. To further complicate the situation, rumor of Hortense's presence in Paris began to spread, and on 5 May a crowd of Bonapartists came to demonstrate outside her hotel on Place Vendôme, shouting "Vive l'Empereur". The new Orléanist government ordered Hortense and her son to leave France the next day.

She traveled in Germany and Italy before she purchased the Château Arenenberg in the Swiss canton of Thurgau in 1817. She lived there until she died of cancer on 5 October 1837, at the age of fifty-four. She is buried next to her mother Joséphine in the Saint-Pierre-Saint-Paul church in Rueil-Malmaison. After her death, her remaining legitimate son, Charles-Louis Napoleon, returned to Paris, where he became Emperor Napoleon III.

A portrait of Hortense hangs at James Monroe’s Highland, the Virginia plantation home of James Monroe, fifth President of the United States. It was one of three portraits Hortense gave to Monroe's daughter Eliza, with whom she attended school in France. (The other two portraits are of Hortense's brother Eugène de Beauharnais and of Jeanne-Louise-Henriette Campan, the headmistress of the school Hortense and Eliza attended.) Eliza named her daughter, Hortensia Monroe Hay, in honour of her Godmother Hortense.

== Issue ==
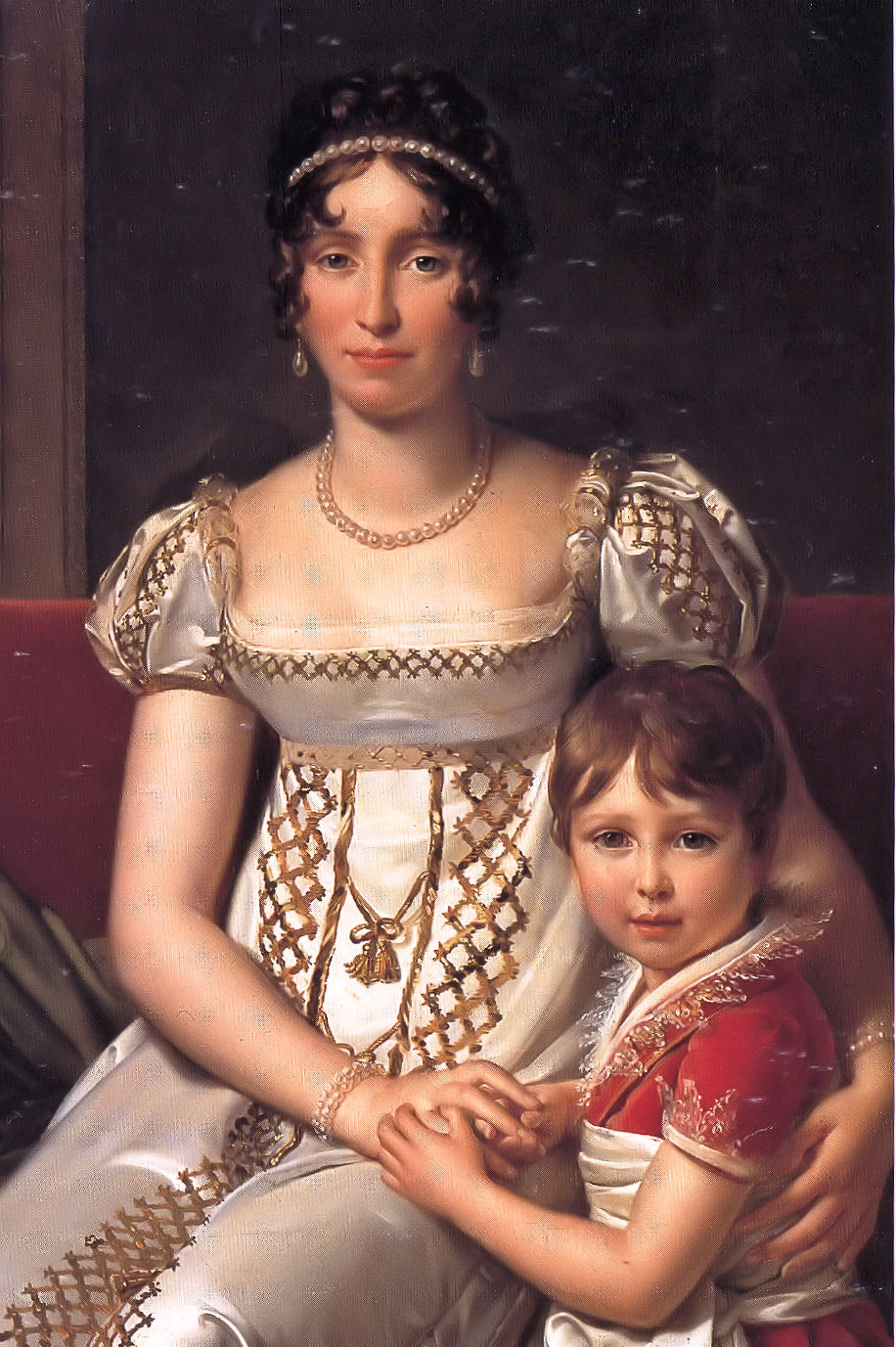
Hortense with her son Napoleon Charles (portrait by François Gérard, 1806)

With Louis Bonaparte, she had three sons:

- Napoléon Louis Charles Bonaparte (10 October 1802 – 5 May 1807), who died when he was four years old.
- Napoléon Louis Bonaparte (11 October 1804 – 17 March 1831), who married Charlotte Napoléone Bonaparte on 23 July 1826.
- Charles-Louis Napoléon Bonaparte, later Napoleon III (20 April 1808 – 9 January 1873), who married Eugénie de Palafox, Countess of Montijo on 29 January 1853. They had one son.

With Charles, Comte de Flahaut, she had one son:

- Charles Auguste Louis Joseph (21 October 1811 – 10 March 1865), whom his half-brother Napoléon III created Duke of Morny in 1862.

== Cultural depictions ==
Film

- Huguette Duflos in The Pearls of the Crown (1937)
- Rosalyn Boulter in A Royal Divorce (1983)
- Micheline Presle in Napoléon (1955)
- Isabella Brownson (adult) / Erin Ainsworth (child) in Napoleon (2023)

Television

- Sorcha Cusack in Napoleon and Love (1974)
- Liliana Komorowska in Napoléon et l'Europe (1991)
- Ludivine Sagnier in Napoléon (2002)
- Yulia Mayboroda in Aide-de-camps of Love (2005)
- Lily Taïeb in Carême

== See also ==
- Arenenberg – Estate and chateau in Switzerland

Hortense de Beauharnais House of Beauharnais Born: 10 April 1783 Died: 5 October 1837
Dutch royalty
Vacant Title last held by Maria Theresa of Naples and Sicily as Consort of the Austrian Netherlands	Queen consort of Holland; 5 June 1806 – 1 July 1810	Vacant Title next held by Wilhelmine of Prussia as Queen of the Netherlands
