= Napoléon Louis Bonaparte =

King of Holland in 1810

Louis II
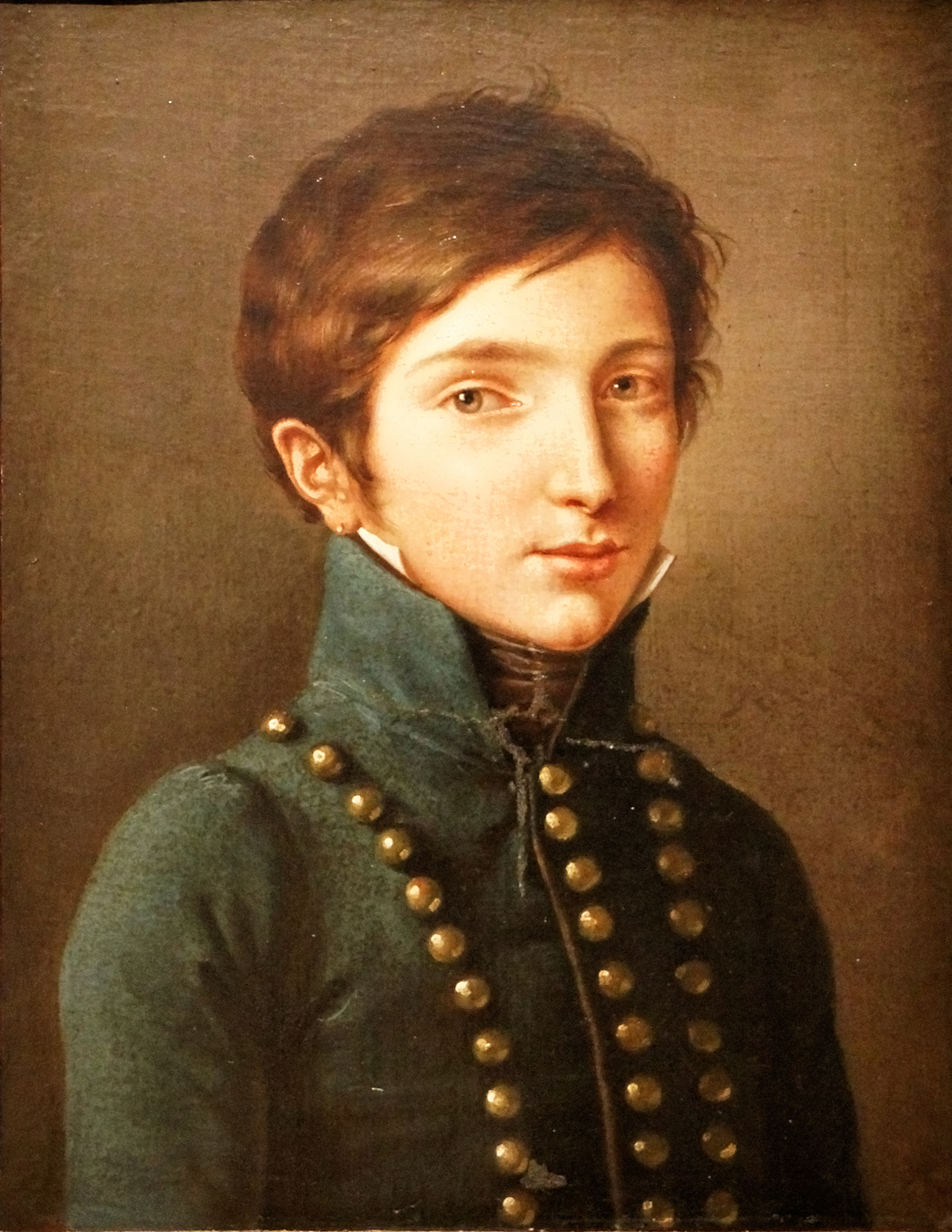
- Portrait by Félix Cottrau after Jean-Baptiste Wicar

King of Holland
- Reign: 1 – 13 July 1810
- Predecessor: Louis I
- Successor: William I as King of Netherlands

Grand Duke of Berg
- Reign: 3 March 1809 – 1 December 1813
- Predecessor: Joachim I
- Regent: Napoleon I
- Born: Napoléon-Louis Bonaparte; 11 October 1804; Paris, French Empire
- Died: 17 March 1831 (aged 26); Forlì, Papal States
- Burial: Saint-Leu-la-Forêt
- Spouse: Charlotte Bonaparte (m. 1826)
- House: Bonaparte
- Father: Louis Bonaparte
- Mother: Hortense de Beauharnais

Royal styles of Louis II of Holland
- Reference style: His Majesty
- Spoken style: Your Majesty

Napoléon-Louis Bonaparte (11 October 1804 – 17 March 1831) was Grand Duke of Berg and Cleves from 1809 to 1813 and King of Holland for less than two weeks in July 1810 as Louis II (Dutch: Lodewijk II). He was a son of Louis Bonaparte (King Louis I) and Queen Hortense. His father was the younger brother of Napoleon I of France who ruled the Napoleonic Kingdom of Holland from 1806 to 1810. His mother was the daughter of Josephine de Beauharnais, Napoleon's first wife. His younger brother, Louis-Napoléon, became Emperor of the French in 1852 as Napoleon III.

== Biography ==
Napoléon Louis's brother, Napoléon Charles, died in 1807 at the age of four. On his death, Napoléon Louis became Prince Royal of Holland. It also made Napoléon Louis the second eldest nephew of Emperor Napoléon I, who at the time had no legitimate children, and he was regarded as his uncle's likely eventual successor. He lost this presumptive status on 20 March 1811 when Napoléon I's second wife, Marie Louise, gave birth to a son, Napoléon François Joseph Charles Bonaparte, who was styled the King of Rome and later Duke of Reichstadt.

In 1809, Napoléon I appointed him Grand Duke of Berg, a position he held until 1813.

On 1 July 1810, Louis I of Holland abdicated his throne in favour of Napoléon Louis. For the nine days between his father's abdication and the fall of Holland to the advancing French army in July 1810, Napoléon Louis reigned as Lodewijk II, King of Holland.

When Napoléon I was deposed in 1815 after the Battle of Waterloo, the House of Bourbon was restored to the French throne. Napoléon Louis fled into exile, although the Bonaparte family never abandoned hopes of restoring the Napoleonic Empire.

On 23 July 1826 Napoléon Louis married his first cousin, Charlotte, the daughter of Joseph Bonaparte, eldest brother of Napoléon I. He and his younger brother Louis-Napoléon Bonaparte settled in Italy, where they embraced liberal politics and became involved with the Carbonari, who opposed Austrian domination of northern Italy.

On 17 March 1831, while fleeing Italy during a crackdown on revolutionary activity by Papal and Austrian forces, Napoléon Louis, who was suffering from measles, died in Forlì. The French Empire was eventually restored by his younger brother Louis-Napoléon, who became Napoléon III in 1852.

Napoléon Louis is buried at Saint-Leu-la-Forêt, Île-de-France.

== Gallery ==
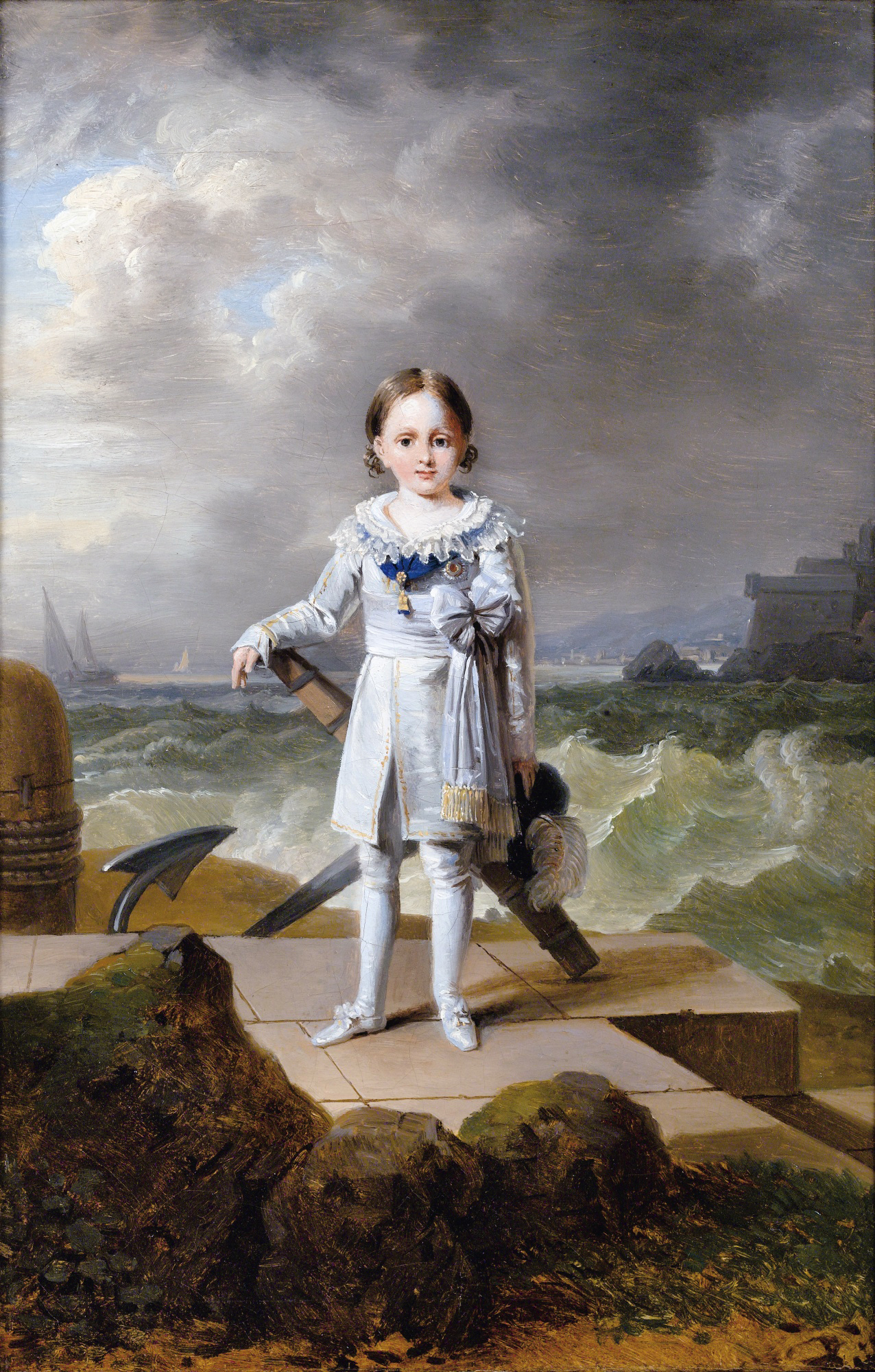
Portrait by François Kinson, c. 1810

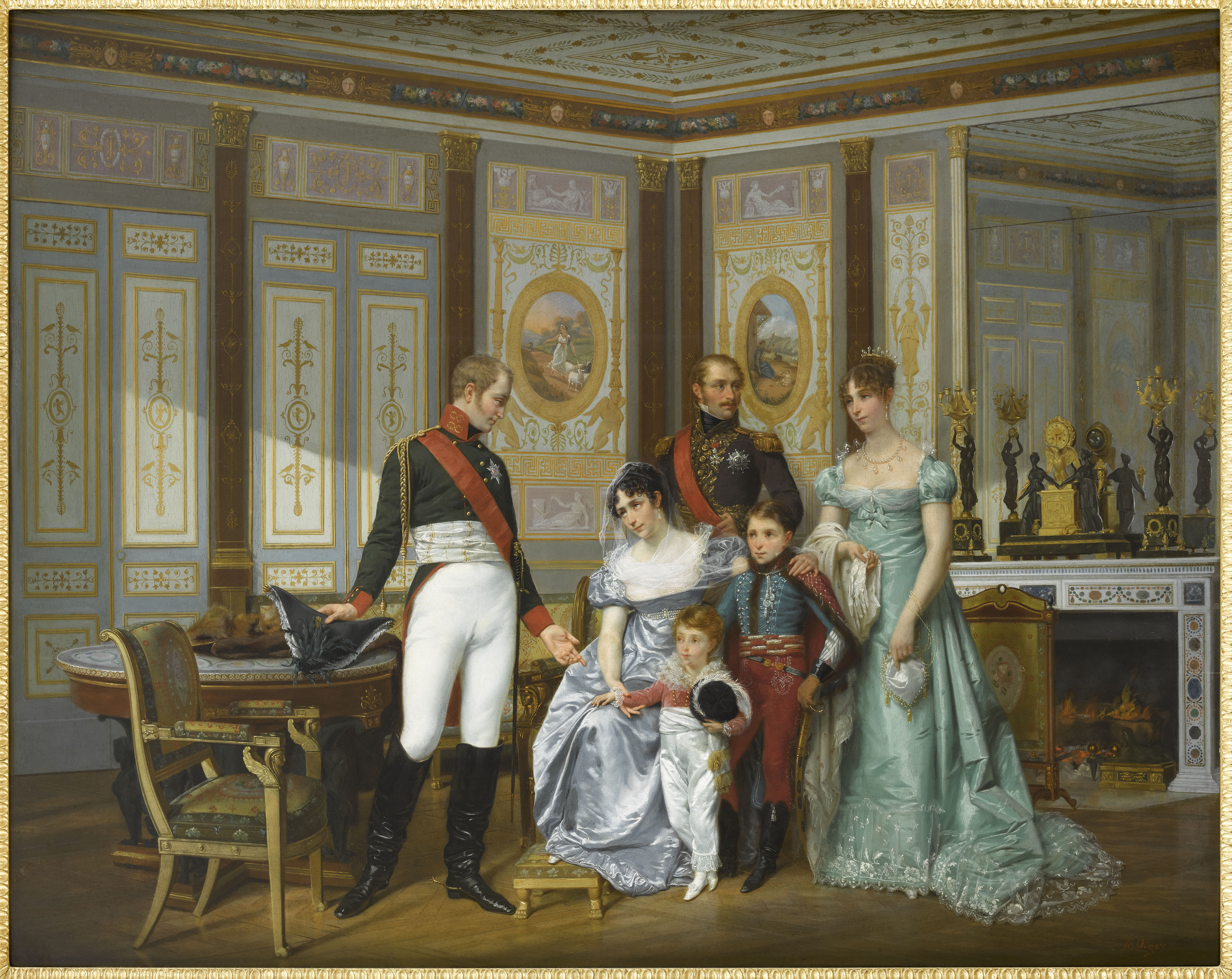
With family and Emperor Alexander I of Russia at Château de Malmaison

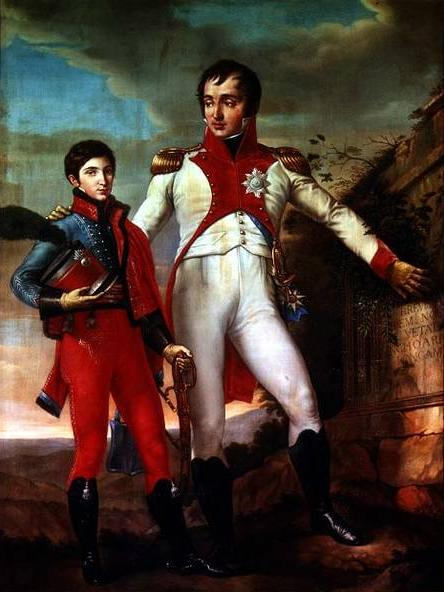
Portrait with his father, Louis Bonaparte, by Jean-Baptiste Wicar

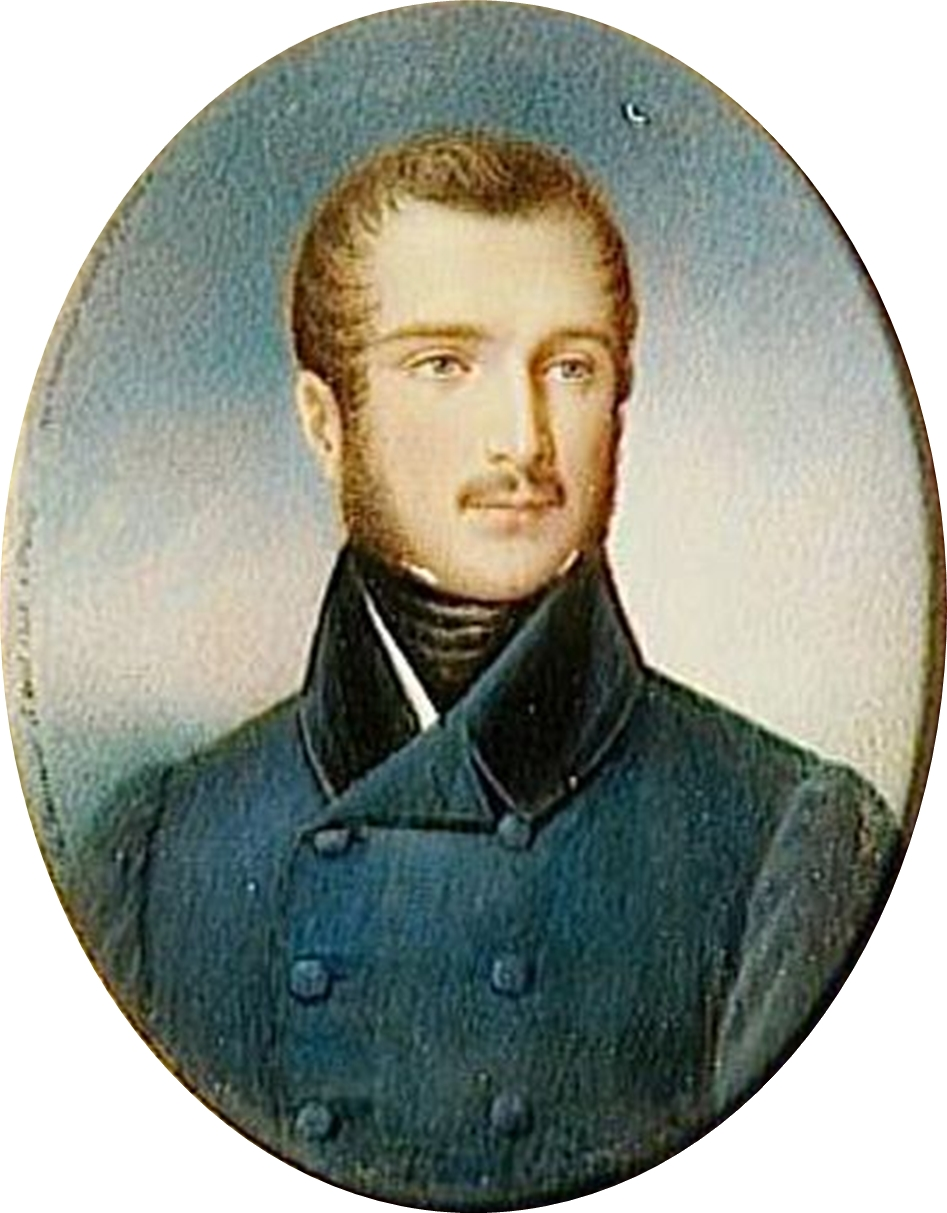
Posthumous portrait, 1858

Coat of arms of Napoleon Louis Bonaparte as Grand Duke of Cleves and Berg

Coat of arms of Napoleon Louis Bonaparte as King of Holland

Napoléon Louis Bonaparte House of Bonaparte Born: 11 October 1804 Died: 17 March 1831
Regnal titles
Preceded by Louis I	King of Holland; 1 July 1810 – 13 July 1810	Vacant Title next held by William I as King of the Netherlands
Preceded by Joachim I	Grand Duke of Berg and Cleves; 3 March 1809 – 1 December 1813	Title abolished
Dutch royalty
Preceded by Napoléon Charles Bonaparte	Heir to the Dutch throne as Prince Royal of Holland; 5 May 1807 – 1 July 1810	Vacant Title next held by William Frederick as Prince of Orange
