= Napoléon-Charles Bonaparte =

Prince Royal of Holland (1802–1807)

- Prince Royal of Holland; Prince Français
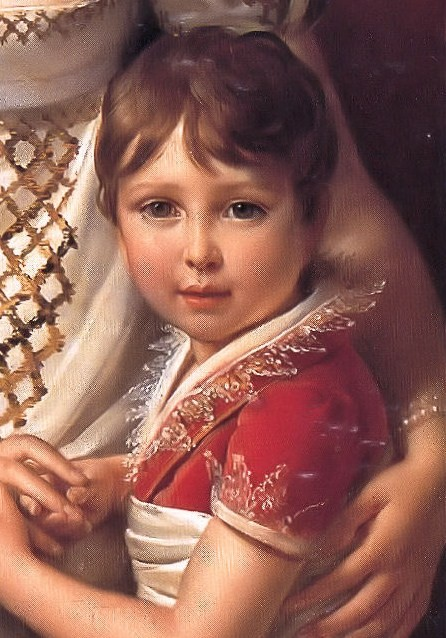
- Born: 10 October 1802; Paris, France
- Died: 5 May 1807 (aged 4); The Hague, Holland
Names
- Napoléon Louis Charles Bonaparte
- House: Bonaparte
- Father: Louis I of Holland
- Mother: Hortense de Beauharnais

Napoléon Louis Charles Bonaparte (10 October 1802 – 5 May 1807) was the eldest son of Louis Bonaparte and Hortense de Beauharnais. His father was Emperor Napoleon I's younger brother; his mother was the daughter of Napoleon's first wife, Joséphine de Beauharnais.

== Life ==
At the time of his birth, his uncle was the First Consul of France and childless. Napoleon Charles was his eldest nephew and was seen as a potential heir, but he died before reaching his fifth birthday on 5 May 1807 of croup.

Napoleon Charles had two brothers: the youngest, Louis Napoleon, eventually became Emperor as Napoleon III in 1852.

The strong attachment that Napoleon showed towards the child, which was not repeated with his two younger brothers, gave rise to speculation that Napoleon-Charles was the son of a forbidden relationship between Napoleon and his stepdaughter Hortense.

== Ancestry ==
Ancestors of Napoléon-Charles Bonaparte

8. Giuseppe Maria Buonaparte
4. Carlo Maria Buonaparte
9. Maria Saveria Paravicini
2. Louis Bonaparte, King of Holland
10. Giovanni Geronimo Ramolino
5. Maria Letizia Ramolino
11. Angela Maria Pietrasanta
1. Prince Napoléon-Charles Bonaparte
12. François de Beauharnais, marquis de la Ferté-Beauharnais
6. Alexandre, vicomte de Beauharnais
13. Marie Anne Henriette Françoise de Pyvart de Chastullé
3. Hortense de Beauharnais
14. Joseph-Gaspard Tascher de la Pagerie
7. Joséphine Tascher de La Pagerie
15. Rose-Claire des Vergers de Sannois

Napoléon-Charles Bonaparte House of Bonaparte Born: 10 October 1802 Died: 5 May 1807
Dutch royalty
New title	Heir to the Dutch throne as Prince Royal of Holland; 5 June 1806 – 5 May 1807	Succeeded by Napoléon Louis Bonaparte
