= List of heirs to the Dutch throne =

This page is a list of heirs to the Dutch throne. The list includes all individuals who were considered to inherit the throne of the Netherlands, either as heir apparent or as heir presumptive, since the constitution of the Kingdom of the Netherlands on 16 March 1815. Those who succeeded as King or Queen of the Netherlands are shown in bold. The list also shows who were next in line to the heirs.

Heirs to the Dutch throne
Monarch	Heir	Relationship to monarch	Became heir (Date; Reason)	Ceased to be heir (Date; Reason)	Next in line of succession
Willem I	**Prince Willem, Prince of Orange**	Son	16 March 1815; Dutch throne founded	7 October 1840; Father abdicated, became king	Prince Frederik, 1815–1817, brother
Willem I	**Prince Willem, Prince of Orange**	Son	16 March 1815; Dutch throne founded	7 October 1840; Father abdicated, became king	**Prince Willem**, 1817–1840, son
Willem II	**Prince Willem, Prince of Orange**	Son	7 October 1840; Father became king	17 March 1849; Father died, became king	Prince Willem, son
Willem III	Prince Willem, Prince of Orange	Son	17 March 1849; Father became king	11 June 1879; Died	Prince Maurits, 1849–1850, brother
Willem III	Prince Willem, Prince of Orange	Son	17 March 1849; Father became king	11 June 1879; Died	Prince Hendrik, 1850–1851, uncle
Willem III	Prince Willem, Prince of Orange	Son	17 March 1849; Father became king	11 June 1879; Died	Prince Alexander, 1851–1879, brother
Willem III	Prince Alexander, Prince of Orange	Son	11 June 1879; Brother died	21 June 1884; Died	Prince Frederik, 1879–1881, granduncle
Willem III	Prince Alexander, Prince of Orange	Son	11 June 1879; Brother died	21 June 1884; Died	**Princess Wilhelmina**, 1881–1884, half-sister
Willem III	**Princess Wilhelmina**	Daughter	21 June 1884; Half-brother died	23 November 1890; Father died, became queen	Sophie, Grand Duchess of Saxe-Weimar-Eisenach, aunt
Wilhelmina	Sophie, Grand Duchess of Saxe-Weimar-Eisenach	Aunt	23 November 1890; Niece became queen	23 March 1897; Died	Hereditary Grand Duke Karl August of Saxe-Weimar-Eisenach, 1890–1894, son
Wilhelmina	Sophie, Grand Duchess of Saxe-Weimar-Eisenach	Aunt	23 November 1890; Niece became queen	23 March 1897; Died	Hereditary Grand Duke Wilhelm Ernst of Saxe-Weimar-Eisenach, 1894–1897, grandson
Wilhelmina	Wilhelm Ernst, Grand Duke of Saxe-Weimar-Eisenach	First cousin once removed	23 March 1897; Grandmother died	30 April 1909; Daughter born to queen	Prince Bernhard of Saxe-Weimar-Eisenach, 1897–1900, brother
Wilhelmina	Wilhelm Ernst, Grand Duke of Saxe-Weimar-Eisenach	First cousin once removed	23 March 1897; Grandmother died	30 April 1909; Daughter born to queen	Marie, Princess Heinrich VII Reuß of Köstritz, 1900–1909, aunt
Wilhelmina	**Princess Juliana**	Daughter	30 April 1909; Born	4 September 1948; Mother abdicated, became queen	Wilhelm Ernst, Grand Duke of Saxe-Weimar-Eisenach, 1909–1922, second cousin
Wilhelmina	**Princess Juliana**	Daughter	30 April 1909; Born	4 September 1948; Mother abdicated, became queen	None (Note: In 1922, the law of succession was changed to include proximity of blood, limiting succession to three degrees of kinship from the current monarch.), 1922–1938
Wilhelmina	**Princess Juliana**	Daughter	30 April 1909; Born	4 September 1948; Mother abdicated, became queen	**Princess Beatrix**, 1938–1948, daughter
Juliana	**Princess Beatrix**	Daughter	4 September 1948; Mother became queen	30 April 1980; Mother abdicated, became queen	Princess Irene, 1948–1964, sister
Juliana	**Princess Beatrix**	Daughter	4 September 1948; Mother became queen	30 April 1980; Mother abdicated, became queen	Princess Margriet, 1964–1967, sister
Juliana	**Princess Beatrix**	Daughter	4 September 1948; Mother became queen	30 April 1980; Mother abdicated, became queen	**Prince Willem-Alexander**, 1967–1980, son
Beatrix	**Prince Willem-Alexander, Prince of Orange**	Son	30 April 1980; Mother became queen	30 April 2013; Mother abdicated, became king	Prince Friso, 1980–2003, brother
Beatrix	**Prince Willem-Alexander, Prince of Orange**	Son	30 April 1980; Mother became queen	30 April 2013; Mother abdicated, became king	Princess Catharina-Amalia, 2003–2013, daughter
Willem-Alexander	Princess Catharina-Amalia, Princess of Orange	Daughter	30 April 2013; Father became king	Incumbent	Princess Alexia, sister

== See also ==
- List of monarchs of the Netherlands
- Lists of rulers in the Low Countries
- Prince of Orange
- Succession to the Dutch throne
