= Caroline Le Roy Appleton =

American social figure (1840-1911)

Caroline Le Roy Bonaparte
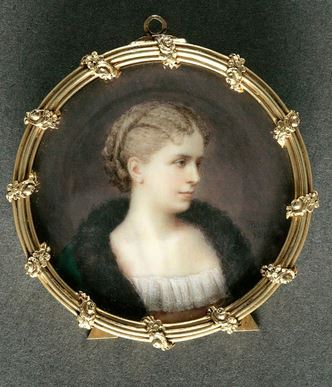
- Born: Caroline Le Roy Appleton; October 3, 1840; Boston, Massachusetts, U.S.
- Died: November 19, 1911 (aged 71); Washington D.C., U.S.
- Spouse(s): Newbold Edgar (m. 1860; died 1869) Jerome Napoleon Bonaparte II (m. 1871; died 1893)
- Children: 5
- Relatives: Daniel Webster (grandfather)

Caroline Le Roy Bonaparte (née Appleton; later Edgar) was an American social figure and member of the Appleton and Bonaparte families.

== Life and family ==
Caroline Le Roy Appleton was born on October 3, 1840, in Boston. She was the eldest child of Samuel Augustus Appleton, who was born in England (but came from an American family) and his wife, Julia Webster. Samuel was a member of the Appleton family, a colonial family from Ipswich, Massachusetts, and therefore had several important family connections. Her mother, Julia Webster Appleton, was the daughter of famed statesman Daniel Webster, who most famously served as United States Secretary of State from 1841-1843 and 1850-1852. She was mentioned in her grandfather's will, where he bequeathed her his portrait by George Peter Alexander Healy.

On November 28, 1860, she was married to Newbold Edgar, with whom she would have three children, two boys and one girl. Newbold died around 1864 or 1869.

On September 10, 1871, Caroline was married to Jerome Napoleon Bonaparte II, a member of an excluded line of the House of Bonaparte that had resided in the United States. Jerome had previously served in the Crimean and Franco-Prussian wars. He was the brother of Charles Joseph Bonaparte, future United States attorney general, the son of Jerome Napoleon "Bo" Bonaparte, and the grandson of Jerome Bonaparte (brother of Napoleon), and his American wife, Elizabeth Patterson Bonaparte. The two came to know each other during Jerome's time in France, as she had once visited Paris. The wedding was described as long, with a small wedding party consisting of various members of the American Bonaparte and Appleton-Edgar families, although numerous spectators watched. With Jerome, she would have two children. Jerome's grandmother, Elizabeth Patterson Bonaparte, did not approve of the marriage and she did not attend their wedding. She refused to see Caroline under any circumstances, and stopped providing her grandson with an allowance. In spite of this, Elizabeth would eventually reconcile with her grandson.

After their marriage, Jerome Jr decided primarily resided at “Harrison House,” Caroline’s home in Newport, Rhode Island that she had inherited from her first husband. Jerome died in 1893, and Caroline died in 1911 at the age of 71 in Washington D.C..

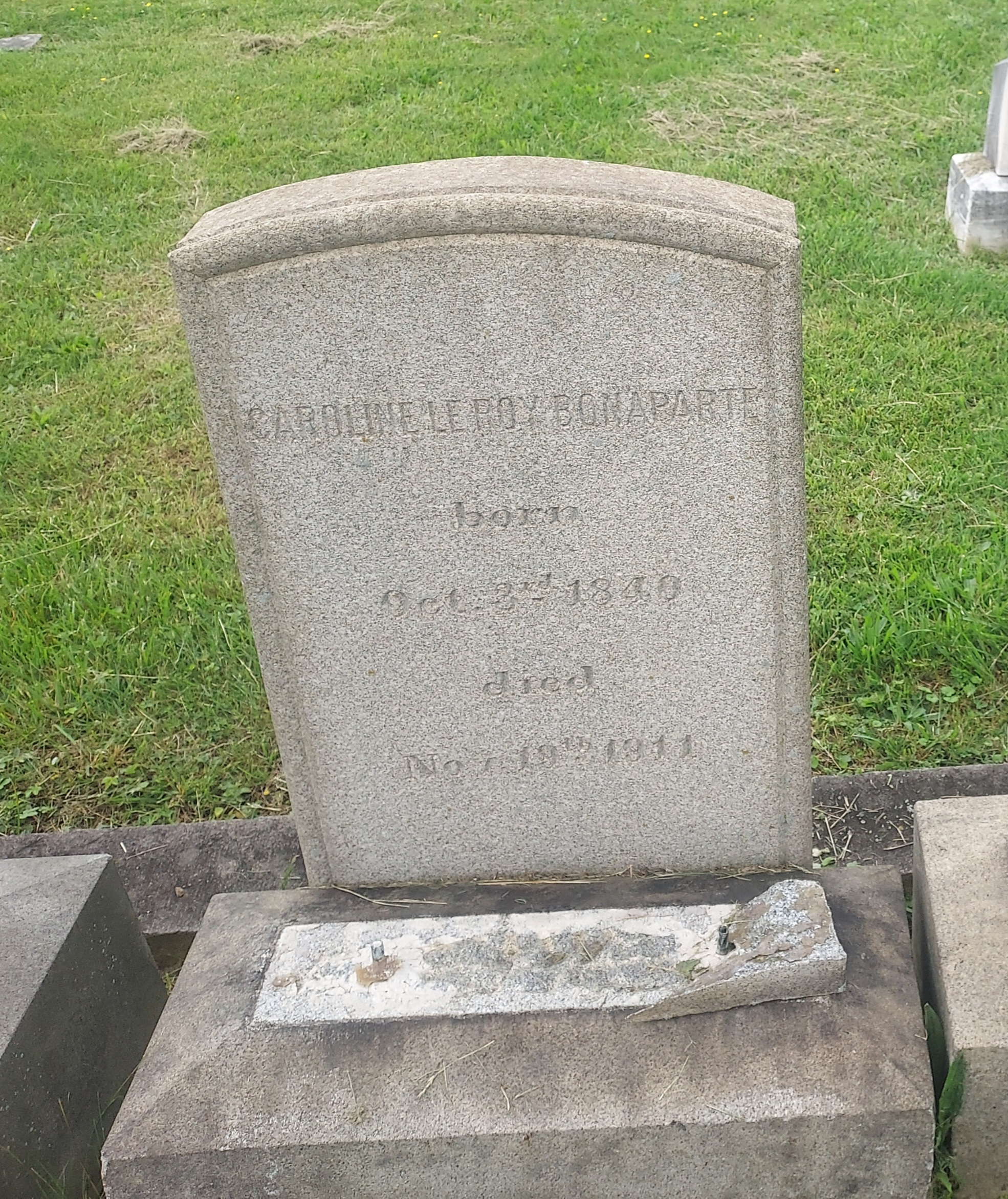
Grave of Caroline Le Roy Bonaparte at Loudon Park Cemetery, Baltimore

== Sources ==
- Aronson, Theo (1964). The Golden Bees: The Story of the Bonapartes. New York Graphic Society.
- Deutsch, Alexandra (2016). A Woman of Two Worlds: Elizabeth Patterson Bonaparte. Maryland Center for History and Culture. ISBN 9780996594431.
- Berkin, Carol (2014). Wondrous beauty: the Life and Adventures of Elizabeth Patterson Bonaparte. New York: Alfred A. Knopf. ISBN 9780307592781.
- Remini, Robert V. (1997). Daniel Webster: The Man and His Time. New York : W.W. Norton & Co. OCLC 1029048280.
