= Ellen Channing Day Bonaparte =

Wife of Charles Joseph Bonaparte (1852–1924)

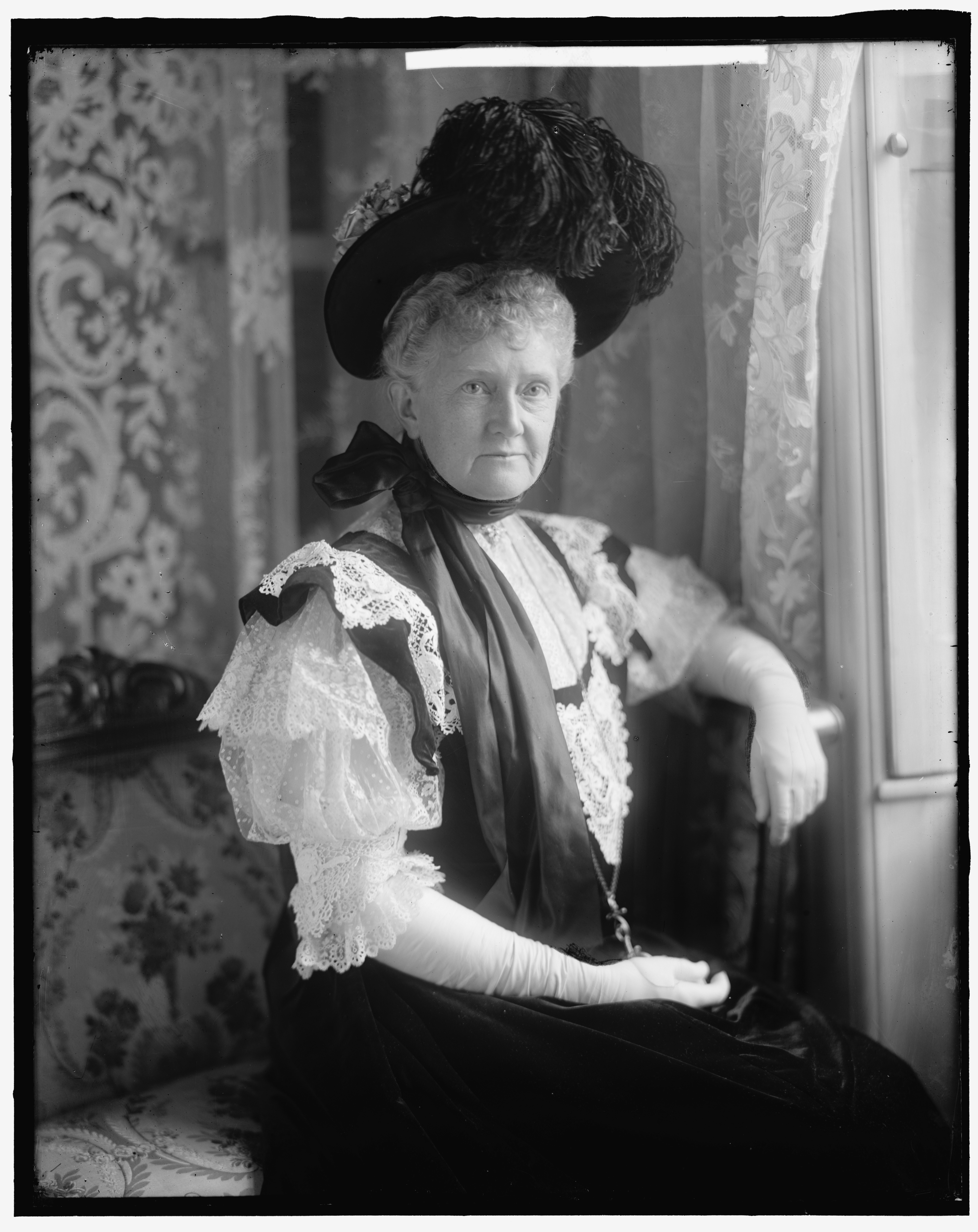
- Photograph by Harris & Ewing
- Born: Ellen Channing Day; September 25, 1852; Hartford, Connecticut, U.S.
- Died: June 23, 1924 (aged 71); Washington D.C., U.S.
- Spouse: Charles Joseph Bonaparte (m. 1875; died 1921)
- Parents: Thomas Mills Day (father); Anna Jones Dunn (mother)
- Relatives: Thomas Day (grandfather); Jeremiah Day (granduncle); Bonaparte family (by marriage)

Ellen Channing Day Bonaparte (née Day; September 25, 1852 – June 23, 1924) was a member of a distinguished Connecticut family who is best remembered for her marriage to Attorney General Charles Joseph Bonaparte.

== Family ==
Ellen Channing Day was born on September 25, 1852, in Hartford, Connecticut. She was the daughter of Thomas Mills Day of Hartford, an attorney. Her grandfather was Thomas Day, whose brother Jeremiah Day was president of Yale. Her mother was Anna Jones (Dunn) Day, originally of Boston. Ellen was also known as "Nellie."

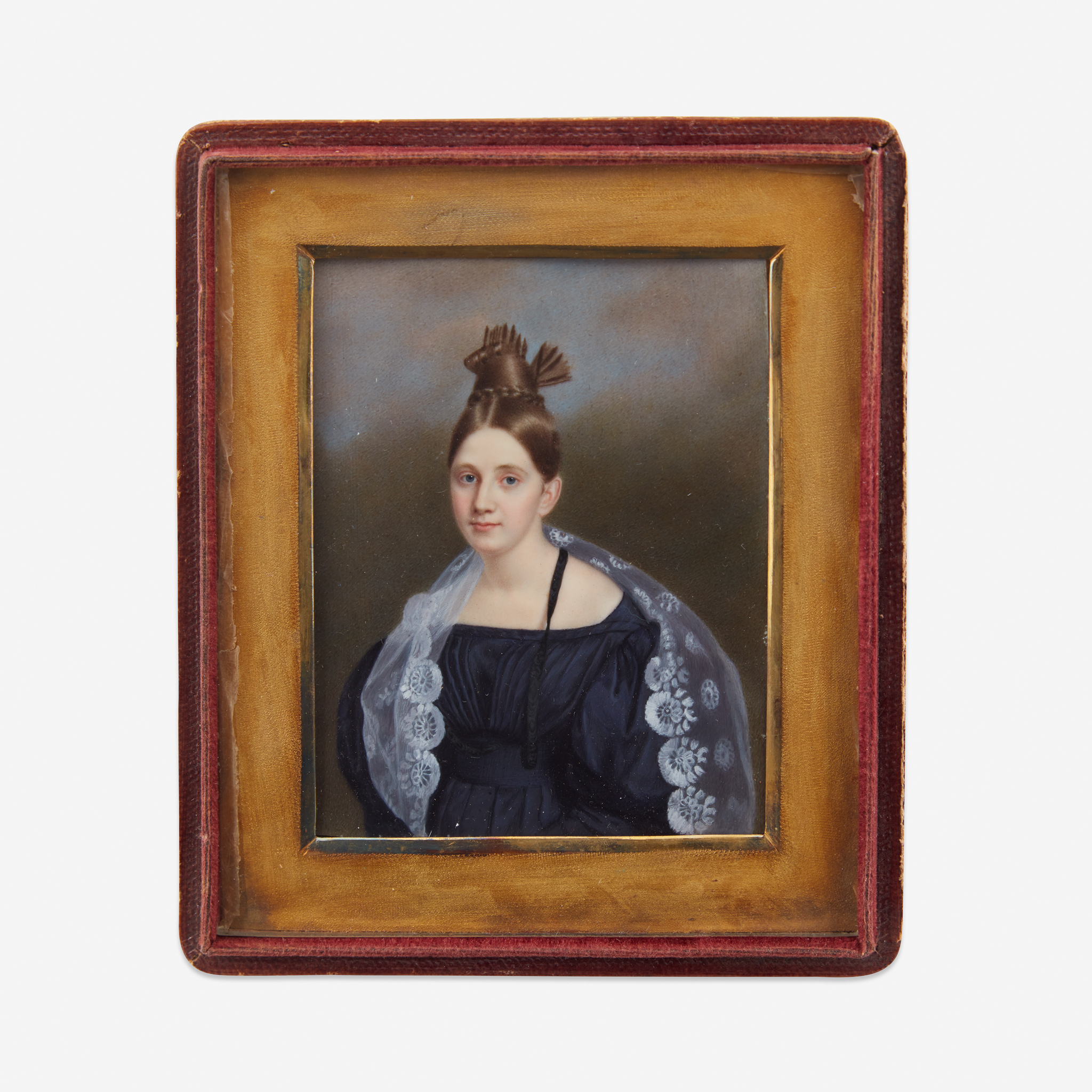
Anna Jones Dunn (1804-1882), Day's mother

== Marriage ==
While visiting friends in Cambridge, Massachusetts, Ellen met Charles Joseph Bonaparte, then a student at Harvard. Charles was the son of Jerome Napoleon "Bo" Bonaparte and his wife, Susan May Williams. Charles' father was the son of Jerome Bonaparte, King of Westphalia, and his first wife, Elizabeth Patterson of Baltimore. Charles made the acquaintance of Ellen while at a party in Cambridge, which had been "formed for purposes of amusement."

She would write an account of the Great Chicago Fire, as she was visiting the city with her mother when the fire occurred.

On September 1, 1875, Ellen and Charles were married in Newport, Rhode Island. They were not engaged until June 1875, due to a three-year visit to Europe Ellen had with her mother. They would have no children.

Charles' grandmother Elizabeth was still alive at the time of their marriage, and although she was disappointed in her descendants' marriages to other Americans, she was more affectionate towards Ellen. Ellen wrote to her mother that "It is such a blessing that the Madame is not an enemy; she tells people she is much pleased with me to her great surprise!" Many of Elizabeth's belongings would eventually end up in the possession of Ellen, and she would donate many of them to the Maryland Historical Society in 1921.

The Bonapartes' Bella Vista residence in Baltimore

Charles would serve as Attorney General to President Theodore Roosevelt, who he enjoyed a friendship with. Known for his Progressive values, he also created the Bureau of Investigation, which would later become the Federal Bureau of Investigation (FBI).

The Bonapartes often lived at the Bella Vista estate in Baltimore. It was constructed by James Bosley Noel Wyatt and William G. Nolting. The couple were "stay-at‑homes," with Ellen not being particularly physically strong, and Charles experiencing heart problems. The Bella Vista would be destroyed in a fire in 1933.

Ellen died on June 23, 1924, in Washington D.C., at the age of 71. Joseph I. France recalled her as having been "a distinguished woman... although she was an invalid".
