= Reisser =

Reisser is a surname. Notable people with the surname include:

- Earl Reisser (1899–1956), American football player
- Michael Reisser (1946–1988), Israeli politician
- Raymond Reisser (1931–2017), French cyclist

== See also ==
- Reister
- Risser
