= Reister =

Reister is a German surname. Notable people with the surname include:

- John Reister (1715–1804), American settler
- Julian Reister (born 1986), German tennis player

== See also ==
- Reisser
