= Canton House =

Historic building in Maryland, US

- U.S. National Register of Historic Places
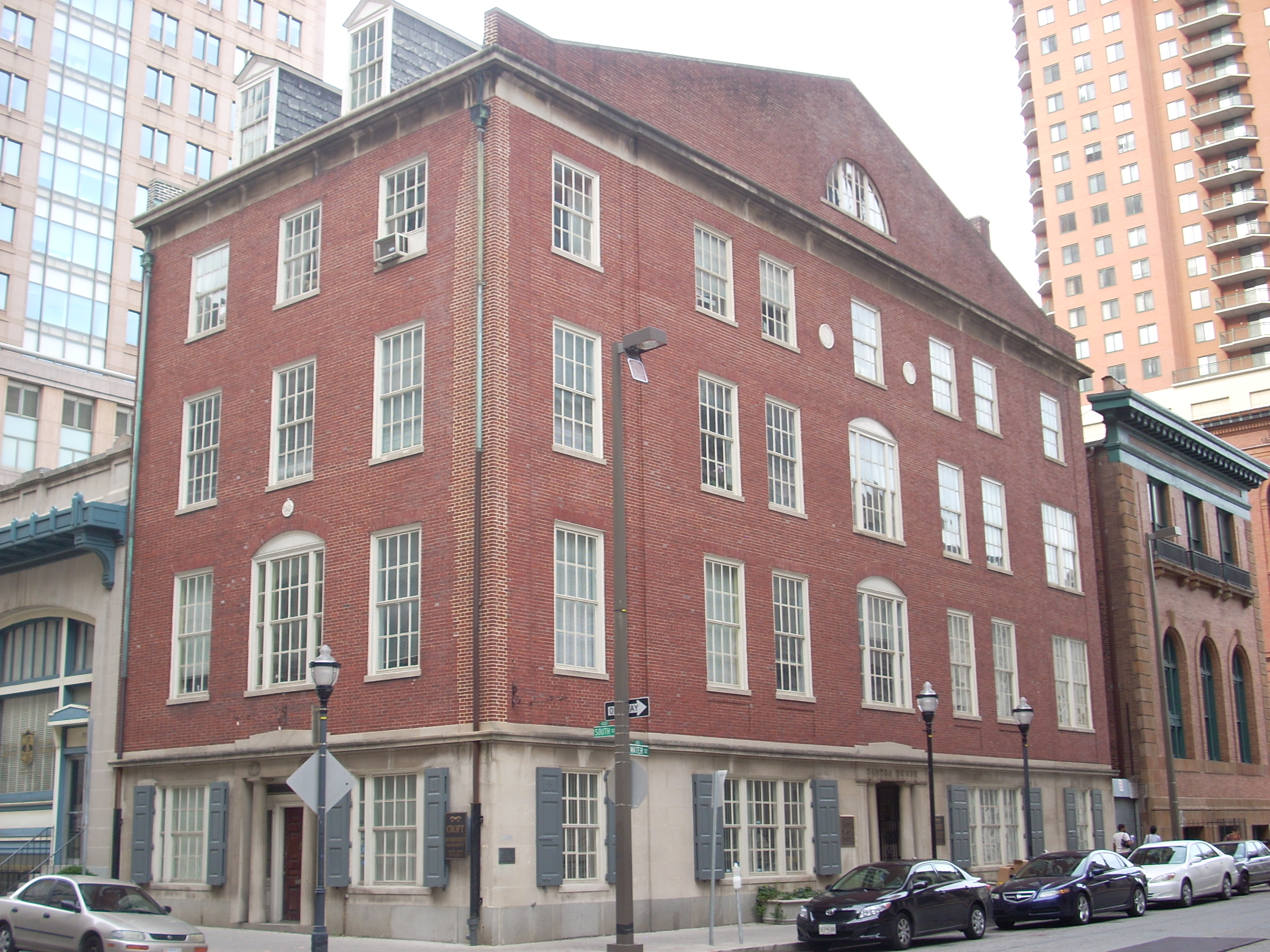
- Canton House in 2011

- Location within Baltimore Location within Maryland Location within the United States
- Location: 300 Water Street, at South Street, Baltimore, Maryland
- Coordinates: 39°17′20″N 76°36′39″W
- Area: less than one acre
- Built: 1923
- Architectural style: Colonial Revival
- NRHP reference No.: 78003140
- Added to NRHP: December 13, 1978

Canton House is a historic office building located on the northeast corner of Water Street and South Street in Baltimore, Maryland, United States. It is a 4 1/2-story Colonial Revival-style building, with seven bays across the front façade of Water Street to the south and three bays across the side facing South Street to the west. The first story level is in marble and brick is laid in Flemish bond from the second story up. It has a sloped peaked roof with two dormer windows facing west to the side. The main entrance features two fluted Corinthian stone columns.

It was constructed in 1923 as the headquarters of one of Baltimore's oldest, largest and most colorful businesses. The Canton Company, a business established in 1828 by Peter Cooper (1791–1883), noted engineer and industrialist. He is most remembered for inventing and manufacturing the Tom Thumb steam locomotive for the recently established Baltimore and Ohio Railroad, the first passenger railway line in America in 1827 as it made its transition from using horse power to steam power to pull its railroad cars on the first segment of the line from Baltimore southwest to Ellicott Mills, Maryland, on the upper Patapsco River from Helen Delich Bentley Port of Baltimore.

Columbus O'Donnell, the son of John O'Donnell, a sea captain who brought in the first trade cargos from Canton, China, to Baltimore and America in 1784, along with William Patterson (1752–1835), a noted city merchant, civic leader, co-founder of the Baltimore and Ohio Railroad and the father of the infamous Elizabeth ("Betsy") Patterson Bonaparte, the "Belle of Baltimore", who married Jerome Bonaparte on Christmas Eve, December 24, 1803, the younger brother of the French Emperor Napoleon I and the donor of land for nearby Patterson Park in 1827.

The company was established to develop the industrial, commercial and residential potential of the large tract of land along the north shore of the Patapsco's Northwest Branch, east of the Inner Harbor (then called "The Basin")and southeast of old Baltimore Town and neighboring Fells Point, Baltimore

The Canton House was listed on the National Register of Historic Places in 1978.
