= Susan May Williams =

American heiress (1812–1881)

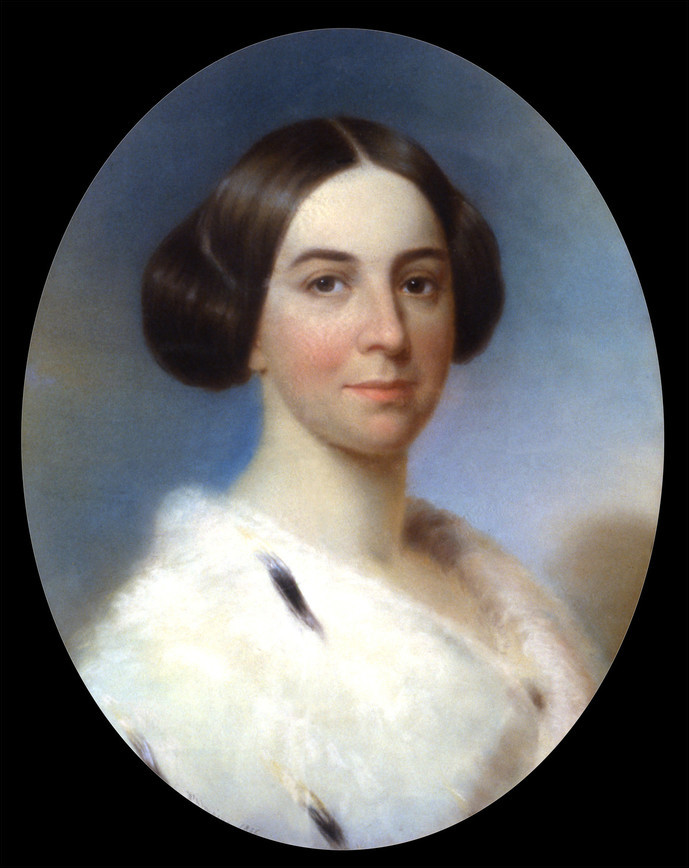
- portrait by George D'Almaine
- Born: April 2, 1812
- Died: September 15, 1881 (aged 69)
- Spouse: Jérôme Napoléon Bonaparte (m. 1829; died 1870)
- Issue: Jerome Napoleon Bonaparte II; Charles Joseph Bonaparte
- Father: Benjamin Williams
- Mother: Sarah Copeland

Susan May Williams Bonaparte (April 2, 1812 – September 15, 1881) was an American heiress and the wife of Jérôme Napoléon Bonaparte, a French-American nephew of Napoléon I, Emperor of France and a Baltimore lawyer and landowner.

== Biography ==
Susan was the daughter of Benjamin Williams, a native of Roxbury, Massachusetts, who became a prominent Baltimore merchant; and his wife, Sarah Copeland, widow of Nathaniel Morton. In 1827, Williams helped found the Baltimore and Ohio Railroad, the first railroad company in the United States, in response to the opening of the Erie Canal and its competition with the port of Baltimore.

In November 1829, Susan married Jérôme Napoleon Bonaparte, the son of Elizabeth Patterson, an American socialite, and Jérôme Bonaparte; their marriage had been annulled after three years on the orders of Napoléon himself so that his brother could make a more advantageous marriage. Jérôme Napoleon, who had graduated from Harvard but found he preferred raising horses to working in law, soon became interested in Susan and the $200,000 fortune she had inherited. According to his uncle Henry Patterson, the match was purely mercenary on Bonaparte's part. The groom's maternal grandfather, William Patterson, one of the wealthiest men in Maryland, made the financial arrangements for the marriage and gave the couple Montrose Mansion as a wedding gift. Their wedding was conducted in secret behind the back of his mother, who was away in Europe at the time and hoping for an aristocratic match for her son; Susan and Elizabeth Patterson Bonaparte never successfully reconciled after this rift.

Their sons were the soldier Jerome Napoleon Bonaparte II (1830-1893) and the lawyer and government official Charles Joseph Bonaparte (1851-1921).

General Lew Wallace described Susan as:

...staunchly Union, a tall, handsome, black-eyed, Franco-American woman, decidedly masculine in mind, but true to her woman's place
