= Elisha Dyer III =

Elisha Dyer
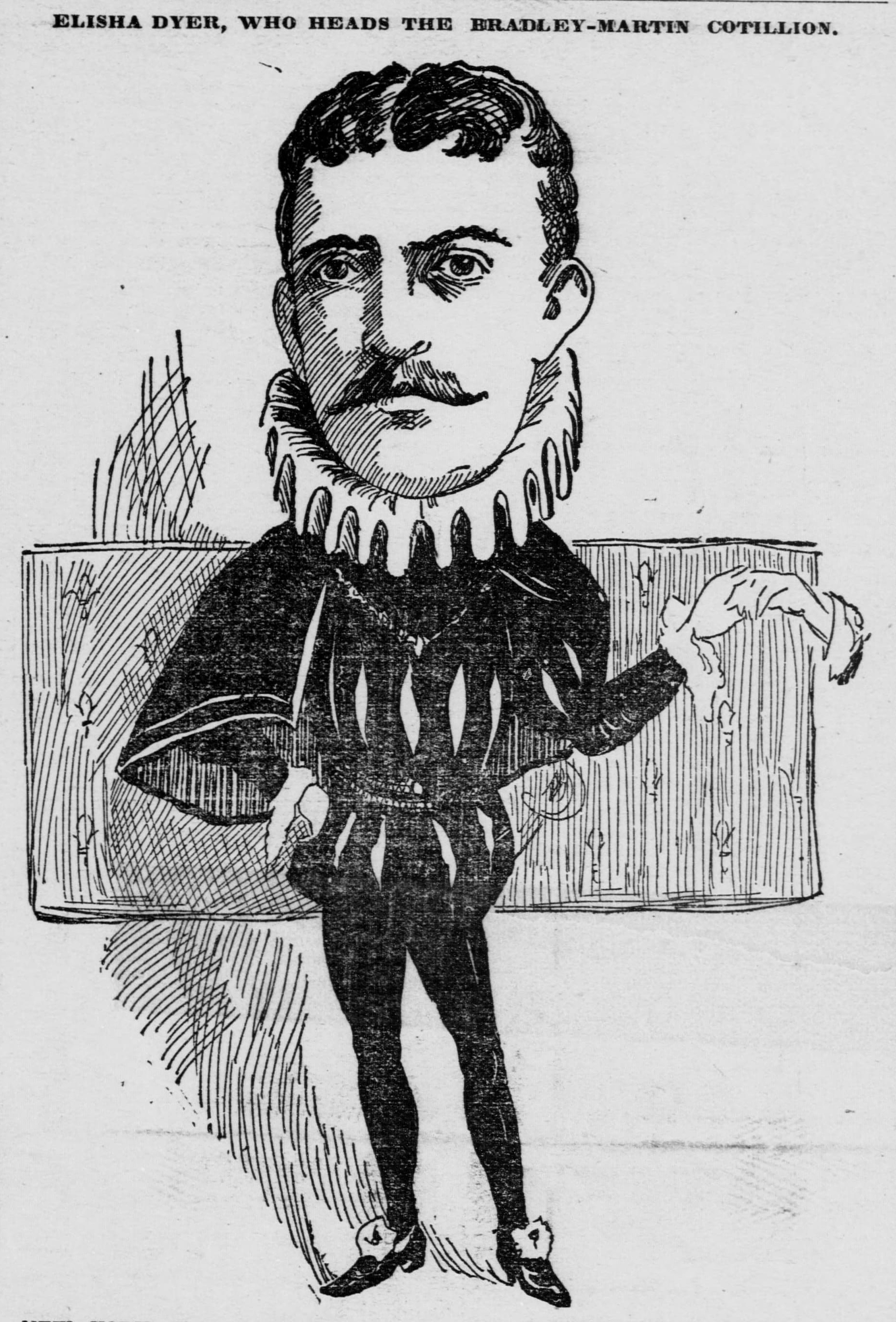
- Born: October 23, 1862; Providence, Rhode Island, US
- Died: June 2, 1917 (aged 54); Newport, Rhode Island, US
- Resting place: Swan Point Cemetery
- Education: Brown University; Columbia Law School
- Spouse: Sidney Turner Swan (m. 1891)
- Parent(s): Elisha Dyer Jr., Nancy A. Viall
- Relatives: George R. Dyer (brother); Elisha Dyer (grandfather)

Elisha Dyer III (October 23, 1862 – June 2, 1917) was an American socialite prominent in Newport and New York society during the Gilded Age.

== Early life ==
Dyer was born on October 23, 1862, in Providence, Rhode Island. His parents were Rhode Island Governor Elisha Dyer Jr. (1839–1906) and Nancy Anthony (née Viall) Dyer (1843–1920), who was the daughter of William Viall and Mary Brayton Anthony. Together, they were the parents of his siblings including George Rathbone Dyer, who died young; Brig. Gen. George Rathbone Dyer, who married Grace Gurnee Scott; and Hezekiah Anthony Dyer, who married Charlotte Osgood Tilden.

His paternal grandparents were Elisha Dyer, also a Rhode Island Governor, and Anna Jones (née Hoppin) Dyer. Dyer was a descendant of Roger Williams, founder of the Rhode Island Colony.

== Career ==
Dyer was educated at private schools in Providence and graduated from Brown University in 1883. He later graduated from Columbia Law School in 1885, and was admitted to the bar in that year. He worked as a broker with Ulman & Co.

=== Society life ===
In 1892, Dyer and his wife were included in Ward McAllister's "Four Hundred", purported to be an index of New York's best families, published in The New York Times. Conveniently, 400 was the number of people that could fit into Mrs. Astor's ballroom. Dyer, a renowned dancer and cotillion leader, was known as "one of the most popular men in the Newport Summer colony" and was an undisputed leader of society. Dyer was known to have introduced Harry Lehr, McAllister's successor, to the Newport colony.

The Dyer's Newport home, known as Wayside, was located on Bellevue Avenue.

He was a member of the Society of Colonial Wars and the Society of the Cincinnati. He belonged to the Union Club of the City of New York, the Knickerbocker Club, the Manhattan Club, the New York Yacht Club, the Country Club of New York, the Automobile Club of New York, the Newport Casino, the Newport Reading Room, the Casino Club, the Clam Bake Club and the Newport Country Club.

== Personal life ==
Dyer was married to Sidney (née Turner) Swan (1857–1933), the daughter of Sidney (née Patterson) Turner and William Fauntleroy Turner. Sidney was also the grand-niece of Elizabeth Patterson Bonaparte and a great-granddaughter of Baltimore merchant William Patterson. They did not have any children together, however, he was the stepfather of his wife's daughter from a previous marriage (to Donnell Swan), Laura Patterson Swan, who married Andrew Robeson in 1913.

Upon his father's death in 1906, he and his siblings inherited $250 each with the remainder of the estate, valued at about $250,000, left to his mother. His father left $5,000 to Miss Francis E. Kinnicutt, his private secretary.

He died of pneumonia at his home in Newport on June 2, 1917. He was interred in Swan Point Cemetery in Providence. In November 1917, his widow sold their five-story residence at 37 West 56th Street in New York City. After his widow's death in 1933, the estate (valued in excess of $1,000,000) was left to Sidney's granddaughter, Lauretta Patterson Robeson.
