= Jerome Napoleon Bonaparte II =

French-American soldier (1830–1893)

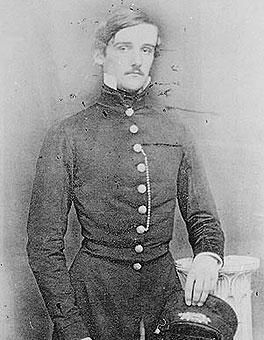
- Born: November 5, 1830; Baltimore, Maryland, U.S.
- Died: September 3, 1893 (aged 62); Prides Crossing, Massachusetts, U.S.
- Military career
- Allegiance: United States; France
- Branch: United States Army; French Army
- Service years: United States Army (1847–1854); French Army (1854–1871)
- Rank: Second Lieutenant (US); Lieutenant Colonel (France)
- Units: Regiment of Mounted Riflemen; 3rd US Cavalry; 7th (French) Dragoons; 1st African Chasseurs; 1st Carabiniers; 3rd Cuirassiers; Dragoons of the Empress
- Conflicts: French conquest of Algeria; Crimean War; Second Italian War of Independence; Franco-Prussian War
- Awards: Crimea Medal. Officer of the Légion d'honneur

Jerome Napoleon Bonaparte II (November 5, 1830 – September 3, 1893) was an American military officer who served in the United States Army and later in the French Army. He was a member of the American branch of the Bonaparte family.

== Early life ==
He was born in Baltimore, Maryland on November 5, 1830. He was the eldest son of the French-American Jérôme Napoléon Bonaparte (1805–1870) and his wife, the former Susan May Williams (1812–1881). His younger brother was Charles Joseph Bonaparte, who served as the United States Attorney General and Secretary of the Navy under Theodore Roosevelt.

His paternal grandparents were Jérôme Bonaparte, who reigned as King of Westphalia from 1807 to 1813, and his first wife, the American socialite and successful businesswoman Elizabeth Patterson Bonaparte. Through his grandfather, he was the grandnephew of Emperor Napoleon, who died in 1821. His maternal grandparents were Sarah (née Copeland) Morton Williams and Benjamin Williams, who helped found the Baltimore and Ohio Railroad, the first railroad company in the United States.

Bonaparte entered the United States Military Academy at West Point in 1847 and graduated 11th in the Class of 1852.

== Career ==
Upon graduation, he was commissioned as a second lieutenant and served in Texas with the Regiment of Mounted Riflemen.

Bonaparte resigned from the U.S. Army in August 1854 to serve in the army of his first cousin-once-removed, Emperor Napoleon III. A few weeks later, he was commissioned as a lieutenant of dragoons in the French Army. He fought in the Crimean War, Algeria, the Italian campaign, and the Franco-Prussian War, rising to the rank of lieutenant colonel. For his services, he was the recipient of the decoration of the Medjidie Order from Abdulmejid I, the Sultan of the Ottoman Empire, the Crimea Medal from Queen Victoria of the United Kingdom, and was made a knight of the Légion d'honneur.

Following the Siege of Paris, Bonaparte left the French Army and returned home to the United States.

== Personal life ==
Upon his return to the United States, he married Caroline Le Roy Appleton Edgar (1840–1911), daughter of Samuel and Julia Appleton, and widow of Newbold Edgar. Caroline was also the granddaughter of American statesman, Daniel Webster. Together, they were the parents of two children:

- Louise-Eugénie Bonaparte (February 7, 1873 – January 22, 1923), who married Count Adam Carl von Moltke-Huitfeld (1864–1944) (see Moltke family) in 1896 and had issue.
- Jerome Napoleon Charles Bonaparte (February 26, 1878 – November 10, 1945), who married Blanche Pierce Strebeigh, daughter of Edward and Emily Pierce of Newtonville, Massachusetts, and former wife of Harold Strebeigh of Hewlett, New York, in 1914, no issue. He died after tripping over his dog's leash in Central Park.

Had his family not been excluded, he would have been first in line to the Bonaparte succession from 1873 and would have succeeded in 1891.

Bonaparte died on September 3, 1893, in Prides Crossing, Massachusetts.

=== Legacy ===
His letters from Fort Inge and Fort Ewell have been preserved by the Maryland Historical Society.
