= Thomas Day (Connecticut judge) =

American jurist and politician (1777–1855)

Secretary of the State of Connecticut
- In office 1810–1835
- Preceded by: Samuel Wyllys
- Succeeded by: Royal Ralph Hinman

Personal details
- Born: July 6, 1777; New Preston, Connecticut, U.S.
- Died: March 1, 1855 (aged 77); Hartford, Connecticut, U.S.
- Spouse: Sarah Coit (m. 1813)
- Children: 8
- Relatives: Jeremiah Day (brother); Ellen Channing Day (granddaughter)
- Education: Yale College (AB); Litchfield Law School
- Awards: Honorary LL.D. degree from Yale Law School

Thomas Day (July 6, 1777 – March 1, 1855) was an American jurist, politician, editor, and author who served as the secretary of the state of Connecticut from 1810 to 1835. He was the author of many reports of cases argued and determined by the Supreme Court of Errors.

== Early life and education ==
Day was born on July 6, 1777, in New Preston, Connecticut, to Rev. Jeremiah Day and his third wife Abigail (née Noble) Osborne Day. He was a descendant of Robert Day, one of the founders of Hartford, Connecticut. Day was tutored by Barzzilai Slosson and was instructed in Latin and Greek by his father and brother, Jeremiah. in 1793 he attended at the New Milford Academy. He graduated from Yale College in 1797 and studied law at Litchfield Law School. From September 1798 to September 1799, he was a tutor at Williams College. Day read law with Daniel Dewey. He was admitted to the bar in December 1799, and began practice in Hartford.

== Career ==
In 1809, Day was appointed assistant secretary of the state of Connecticut and in 1810 secretary, an office which he retained until 1835.

He was appointed as an associate judge of the court of Hartford County in May 1815. From then on he was an associate judge, with the exception of one year, until he was made the chief judge of the court in May 1825. He remained the chief judge of the county court until June 1833. He was a judge of the city court of Hartford from 1818 to 1831 and contributed to city statutes of 1808, 1821, and 1824. He reported the decisions of the court from 1805 until 1853, which were published in twenty volumes.

In 1821, Thomas Day was one of three legal scholars, along with Zephaniah Swift and Lemuel Whitman, that authored an omnibus act which is considered the first time an American legislature took measures to address abortion in statute form. It only restricted persons from taking, administering, or causing one to be administered, "any deadly poison, or other noxious and destructive substance" with intention to murder, or cause or procure "the miscarriage of any woman".

He also edited several English law journals, amounting all together to forty volumes, in which he introduced notices of American decisions, and also of later English cases. He was the first recording secretary and an original member of the Connecticut Historical Society, of which he was president from 1839 until his death. He was also the president of the Wadsworth Athenæum. Yale Law School awarded an honorary Doctor of Law degree to Day in 1847.

He was the brother of Yale College president Jeremiah Day.

== Portrait ==
At least in 1878, a portrait of Thomas Day by Alexander Hamilton Emmons, an American painter of Norwich, Connecticut, made near the end of his life, adorned the walls of the rooms of the Connecticut Historical Society in Hartford. The present location of the portrait is not known.
