= Reisterstown, Maryland =

- Census-designated place
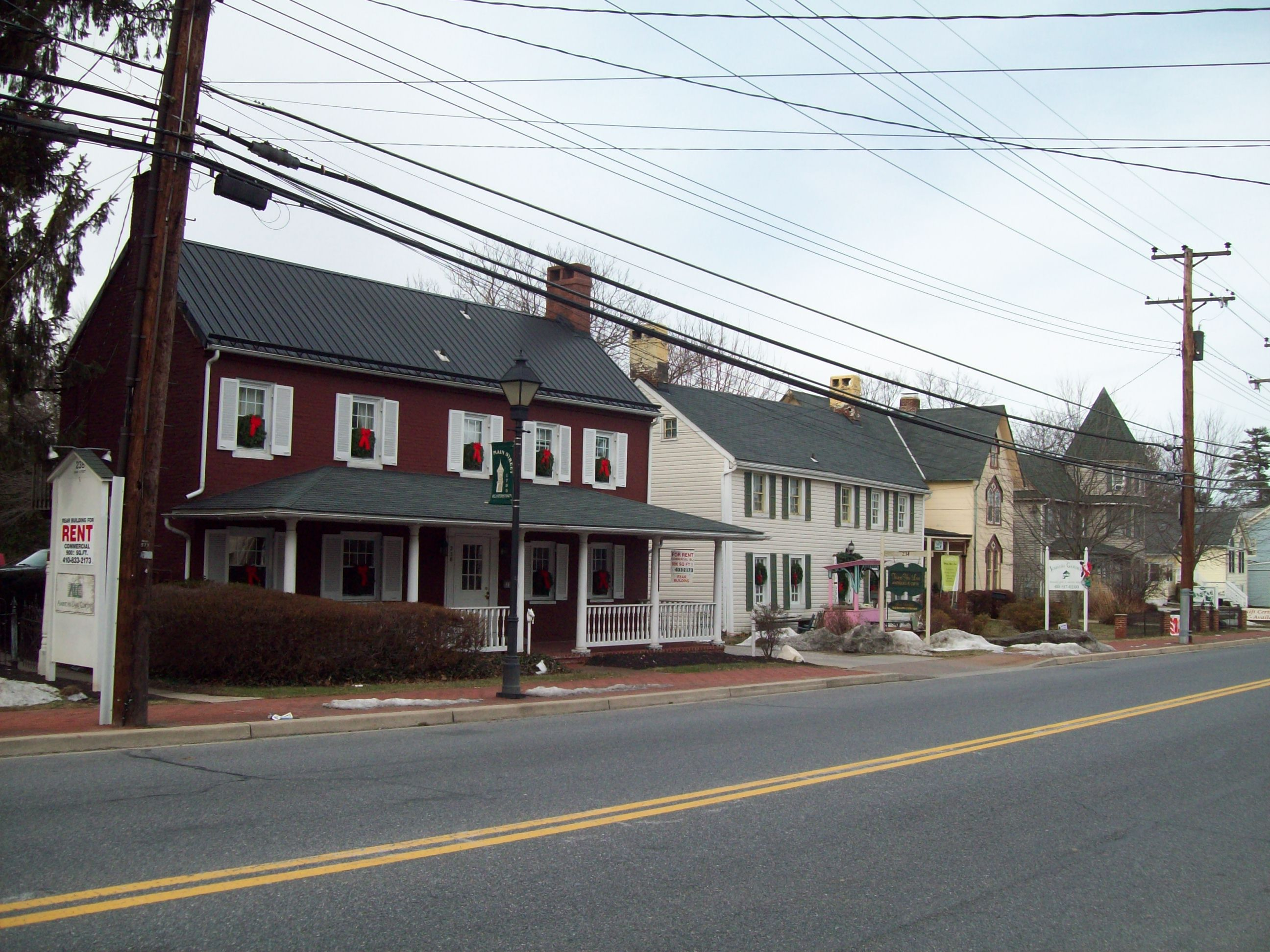
- Historic buildings along Reisterstown Rd.

- Location of Reisterstown, Maryland
- Coordinates: 39°27′25″N 76°48′53″W
- Country: United States
- State: Maryland
- County: Baltimore
- Settled: 1758
- Founder: John Reister

Government
  - Type: unincorporated

Area
  - Total: 5.10 sq mi (13.20 km^{2})
  - Land: 5.09 sq mi (13.19 km^{2})
  - Water: 0.0039 sq mi (0.01 km^{2})
- Elevation: 720 ft (220 m)

Population (2020)
  - Total: 26,822
  - Density: 5,267.6/sq mi (2,033.82/km^{2})
- Time zone: UTC−5 (Eastern (EST))
  - Summer (DST): UTC−4 (EDT)
- ZIP codes: 21136, 21071
- Area codes: 410, 443
- FIPS code: 24-65600
- GNIS feature ID: 0591112

Reisterstown is an unincorporated community and census-designated place in Baltimore and Carroll counties, Maryland, United States. As of the 2010 census, it had a population of 25,968.

Founded by German immigrant John Reister in 1758, Reisterstown is located to the northwest of Baltimore. Though it is older than the surrounding areas, it now serves primarily as a residential suburb of Baltimore. The center is designated the Reisterstown Historic District and listed on the National Register of Historic Places in 1979. Also listed are the Montrose Mansion and Chapel and St. Michael's Church.

Just outside the community, to its north, is the small military reservation of Camp Fretterd, which serves as a training site for the Maryland Army National Guard and Air Guard. The Maryland Defense Force is also headquartered at Camp Fretterd.

== Geography ==
According to the U.S. Census Bureau, the Reisterstown CDP occupies 5.2 square miles (13.4 km^{2}), all land.

The community stretches along Reisterstown Road (Maryland Route 140) and the Northwestern Expressway (Interstate 795) just north of Owings Mills. Its northern boundary lies near the junction of MD-140 and Hanover Pike (MD-30), which heads north towards Hampstead. MD-140 passes the northern end of I-795 and continues northwest as Westminster Pike, heading towards Finksburg and Westminster. The community of Glyndon is located adjacent to the northern portion of Reisterstown along Butler Road (MD-128), which connects Reisterstown with the Baltimore-Harrisburg Expressway (Interstate 83). To the east of Reisterstown is the community of Worthington, located around Greenspring Avenue and Park Heights Avenue (MD-129). To the west of Reisterstown is Liberty Reservoir.

== History ==
=== Reister's Town ===
John Reister purchased a 20-acre (81,000 m^{2}) tract of land, which he called "Reister's Desire", along the Conewago Road on March 2, 1758. He built a tavern on the site, providing food, drink and lodging for travelers. Other businesses serving travelers soon followed, creating the settlement known as Reister's Town, and eventually Reisterstown. With the purchase in 1763 of another 83 acres (340,000 m^{2}) adjoining the original property, Reister began developing both sides of Conewago Road, later renamed Reisterstown Road.

=== Franklin Academy ===
In 1764, John Reister purchased a three-quarter acre lot, which he named Church Hill, as a site for the community's first church, a small building constructed of logs. Funded and built by the Lutheran community, the church was free to all denominations. The building also served as a school house, a secondary function typical of churches at that time.

The town raised money with a public subscription and replaced the log building with a brick school building in 1824, named Franklin Academy in honor of Benjamin Franklin. A cupola was added to the school in 1826. Franklin Academy became the first public high school in the county in 1874 and one of the earliest schools to join the Baltimore County school system.

The former Franklin Academy was converted into a public library in the early 1900s. It still stands beside the Reisterstown Community Cemetery, across the street from the present-day Franklin Middle School. Franklin Academy's cupola, known as the Franklin Bell, is in front of Franklin High School.

== Demographics ==
Historical population
Census	Pop.	Note	%±
1950	2,077		—
1960	4,216		103.0%
1970	14,037		232.9%
1980	19,385		38.1%
1990	19,314		−0.4%
2000	22,438		16.2%
2010	25,968		15.7%
2020	26,822		3.3%
U.S. Decennial Census

=== Racial and ethnic composition ===
Reisterstown CDP, Maryland – Racial and ethnic composition Note: the US Census treats Hispanic/Latino as an ethnic category. This table excludes Latinos from the racial categories and assigns them to a separate category. Hispanics/Latinos may be of any race.
Race / Ethnicity (NH = Non-Hispanic)	Pop 2000	Pop 2010	Pop 2020	% 2000	% 2010	% 2020
White alone (NH)	15,976	13,771	10,076	71.20%	53.03%	37.57%
Black or African American alone (NH)	4,067	7,455	9,295	18.13%	28.71%	34.65%
Native American or Alaska Native alone (NH)	42	46	44	0.19%	0.18%	0.16%
Asian alone (NH)	900	1,623	2,112	4.01%	6.25%	7.87%
Native Hawaiian or Pacific Islander alone (NH)	12	16	6	0.05%	0.06%	0.02%
Other race alone (NH)	48	57	168	0.21%	0.22%	0.63%
Mixed race or Multiracial (NH)	407	678	1,227	1.81%	2.61%	4.57%
Hispanic or Latino (any race)	986	2,322	3,894	4.39%	8.94%	14.52%
Total	22,438	25,968	26,822	100.00%	100.00%	100.00%

=== 2020 census ===
As of the 2020 census, Reisterstown had a population of 26,822. The median age was 37.1 years. 24.2% of residents were under the age of 18 and 14.1% of residents were 65 years of age or older. For every 100 females there were 86.2 males, and for every 100 females age 18 and over there were 81.0 males age 18 and over.

100.0% of residents lived in urban areas, while 0.0% lived in rural areas.

There were 10,127 households in Reisterstown, of which 35.3% had children under the age of 18 living in them. Of all households, 41.7% were married-couple households, 16.5% were households with a male householder and no spouse or partner present, and 35.9% were households with a female householder and no spouse or partner present. About 26.9% of all households were made up of individuals and 9.5% had someone living alone who was 65 years of age or older.

There were 10,659 housing units, of which 5.0% were vacant. The homeowner vacancy rate was 1.1% and the rental vacancy rate was 6.5%.

Racial composition as of the 2020 census
Race	Number	Percent
White	10,522	39.2%
Black or African American	9,443	35.2%
American Indian and Alaska Native	172	0.6%
Asian	2,143	8.0%
Native Hawaiian and Other Pacific Islander	12	0.0%
Some other race	2,331	8.7%
Two or more races	2,199	8.2%
Hispanic or Latino (of any race)	3,894	14.5%

=== 2010 census ===
The census of 2010 reported that there were 25,968 people and 6,740 families residing in the Reisterstown census-designated place (CDP), living in 10,133 of available housing units. The racial makeup of the CDP was 57.2% White, 29.3% African American, 0.4% Native American, 6.3% Asian, 0.1% Pacific Islander, 3.7% from other races, and 3.2% from two or more races. Hispanic or Latino of any race were 8.9% of the population.

Of the community's 10,133 households, 33.0% had children under 18 years, 44.5% were married couples living together, 17.0% had a female householder with no husband present, and 33.5% were non-families. Individuals living alone occupied 81.2% of the non-family households; 30.4% of these individuals were 65 years of age or older. The average household size was 2.54 and the average family size was 3.07.

In the CDP, the population was spread out, with 27.1% under the age of 20, 6.5% from 20 to 25, 29.6% from 25 to 44, 26.2% from 45 to 64, and 10.5% who were 65 years of age or older. The median age was 36.2 years.

In the 2009–2013 American Community Survey 5-Year Estimates, the median income for a household in the CDP was $60,201, and the median income for a family was $65,911. The per capita income for the CDP was $72,714. About 11.6% of families and 14.4% of the population were below the poverty line, including 20.1% of those under age 18 and 6.6% of those age 65 or over.

== Education ==
=== Public schools ===
- Elementary: Franklin, Cedarmere, Glyndon, Reisterstown, and Chatsworth. All are grades K–5. Franklin, Cedarmere, Glyndon, and Reisterstown also provide preschool education.
- Middle: Franklin (Grades 6–8)
- High: Franklin (Grades 9–12)

=== Private schools ===
- Hannah More School (Grades 9–12)
- Sacred Heart Parochial School (Grades K–8 and preschool)

== Transportation ==
=== Roads ===
Major roads in the Reisterstown area include:

- Butler Road (MD-128)
- Cockeys Mill Road
- Central Avenue
- Deer Park Road
- Dover Road
- Franklin Boulevard
- Hanover Pike (MD-30)
- Ivy Mill Road
- Main Street (MD-140)
- Northwest Expressway (I-795), an interstate highway that connects the community to the Baltimore Beltway
- Red Run Boulevard
- Reisterstown Road (MD-140), the central road and the major transportation artery of the town
- Sacred Heart Lane (formerly MD-127)
- Westminster Pike (MD-140)
- Worthington Avenue

== Town recreation ==
The Reisterstown Area Recreation Council (RRC) organizes athletic and recreational activities for the Reisterstown area.

Reisterstown has two annual festivals, organized with help from the RRC.

- The Bloomin' ArtsFest, at the Franklin Middle School grounds, held in May
- The Reisterstown Festival, at Hannah More Park, held in September

=== Music on Main Street ===
Every year the Reisterstown Main Street organizes free concerts on Friday nights through the late spring till early fall. All concerts are held at the Franklin Middle School (10 Cockeys Mill Road).

=== Reisterstown Farmers Market ===
The Reisterstown Farmers Market is held Sundays June 11 through October 29 from 9am – 1pm, rain or shine. Hosted outside Franklin Middle School at 120 Main Street, the Reisterstown Farmers Market focuses on local vendors with goods ranging from bread to produce, hand-crafted jewelry, and natural products. It is accessible from Main Street, with ample parking available at the middle school.
