= Risser =

Risser is a surname. Notable people with this surname include:

- Eve Risser (born 1982), French jazz musician
- Fred Risser (born 1927), American politician
- Fred Risser (Progressive politician) (1900–1971), American politician
- James C. Risser (born 1946), American philosopher
- James V. Risser (born 1938), American journalist
- Makana Risser Chai, American author
- Oliver Risser (born 1980), Namibian football player
- Paul G. Risser (1939–2014), American ecologist
- René Risser (1869–1958), French mathematician
- Robin Risser (born 2004), French footballer
- Wilko Risser (born 1982), Namibian-German football player

== See also ==
- Risser sign
