= Montrose Mansion and Chapel =

Historic house in Maryland, United States

- U.S. National Register of Historic Places
- Location within Maryland Location within the United States
- Location: 13700 Hanover Rd., Reisterstown, Maryland
- Coordinates: 39°29′52″N 76°51′9″W
- Area: 2 acres (0.81 ha)
- Built: 1826
- Architectural style: Greek Revival, Second Empire, Federal
- NRHP reference No.: 90000354
- Added to NRHP: March 19, 1990

Montrose Mansion and Chapel, originally known as Montrose Mansion, is a historic home located on the campus of Camp Fretterd Military Reservation of the Maryland Army National Guard in Reisterstown, Baltimore County, Maryland.

== History ==
It is a two-story neoclassical stone house constructed originally about 1826 by William Patterson who gave it to his grandson, Jerome Napoleon Bonaparte as a wedding present. By the middle of the 19th century, a large two-story wing was added, then a mansard roof with round-top dormers, a cupola, and a bracketed cornice with pendants was added about 1880. The chapel was completed in 1855 and is a rectangular structure of stone with Greek Revival decorative detailing. It features a three-story bell and entrance tower.

The mansion and tower are separated by about a quarter of a mile.

It was listed on the National Register of Historic Places in 1990.
