= Jérôme Napoléon Bonaparte =

French-American nephew of Napoleon

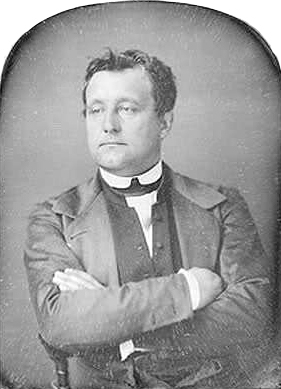
- Jerome Napoleon Bonaparte in his mid-forties
- Born: 5 July 1805; 95 Camberwell Grove, Camberwell, London, England
- Died: 17 June 1870 (aged 64); Baltimore, Maryland, U.S.
- Spouse: Susan May Williams (m. 1829)
- Issue: Jerome Napoleon Bonaparte II; Charles Joseph Bonaparte
- House: Bonaparte
- Father: Jérôme Bonaparte
- Mother: Elizabeth Patterson

Jérôme Napoléon "Bo" Bonaparte (Note: Sometimes referred to as Bonaparte-Patterson or Patterson-Bonaparte) (5 July 1805 – 17 June 1870) was an American farmer, chairman of the Maryland Agricultural Society, and first president of the Maryland Club. He was the son of Elizabeth Patterson and Jérôme Bonaparte, brother of Napoleon I.

== Biography ==
Bonaparte was born in 95 Camberwell Grove, Camberwell, London, but lived in the United States with his wealthy American mother, Elizabeth. His mother's marriage had been annulled by order of Jérôme's uncle, Napoleon I. The annulment caused the rescission of his right to carry the Bonaparte name, although the ruling was later reversed by his cousin, Napoleon III.

He graduated from Mount St. Mary's College (now Mount St. Mary's University) in 1817. Later he received a law degree from Harvard, but did not practice law. He was a founding member of the Maryland Club, serving as its first president.

Jérôme Napoleon was refused marriage to his cousin Charlotte, daughter of Joseph Bonaparte. With a growing disdain for Europe and lack of professional ambition, he opted to marry an American heiress.

In November 1829, Jérôme Napoleon married Susan May Williams of Baltimore, whose wealthy father provided a dowry of $200,000 fortune. Jérôme's maternal grandfather, William Patterson — one of the wealthiest men in Maryland — gave the couple Montrose Mansion as a wedding gift.

It is from them that the American line of the Bonaparte family descended. They had two sons: Jerome Napoleon Bonaparte II (1830–1893), who served as an officer in the armies of both the United States and France, and Charles Joseph Bonaparte (1851–1921), who became United States Attorney General and Secretary of the Navy, and also created the Bureau of Investigation, predecessor of the Federal Bureau of Investigation. Bonaparte died from throat cancer in Baltimore, Maryland, at age 64 and is buried at Loudon Park Cemetery.

=== Constitutional issues ===
It is speculated that Jérôme's prospective title and his position in the line of inheritance to Napoleon as Emperor, as well as the title of duchess for his mother Elizabeth Patterson as part of the recompense offered by Napoleon for her divorce from his brother, is a reason the 11th United States Congress in 1810 proposed the Titles of Nobility Amendment to the Constitution, fearing that Napoleon would attempt to establish a western kingdom in America. This proposed amendment would have stripped an American of his citizenship if he accepted a title of nobility from a foreign nation. The amendment was not approved; at the time, it lacked the approval of only two state legislatures.
