= John Reister =

Founder of Reisterstown, Maryland (1715–1804)

John Reister (1715–1804) was a German immigrant to the Thirteen Colonies who founded the town of Reisterstown, Maryland in 1758.

Born in 1715 and raised in Germany, John Reister moved to America in September 1738. Departing from Rotterdam in the Dutch Republic and arriving in Philadelphia, Reister originally settled in York, Pennsylvania and began using his background in farming to start earning a living. In 1746 he married a York innkeeper's daughter named Margaret Sohn and moved south into Maryland where he had purchased a 50-acre (200,000 m^{2}) tract of land just to the west of modern-day Westminster, Maryland.

The Reisters used this land for farming and were able to create a comfortable life for themselves. While living on this farm, the Reisters had their six children John Jr., Mary, Margaret, Catherine, Philip, and Elizabeth.

On March 2, 1758 Reister purchased a 20-acre (81,000 m^{2}) plot of land to the east of his original property. This land was located at the intersection of several roads that led to Baltimore and points to the north in Pennsylvania. It is believed that Reister decided to purchase this land while traveling along the road on his way to Annapolis. He probably noticed its strategic location and decided to open an inn and tavern for travelers moving along the road.

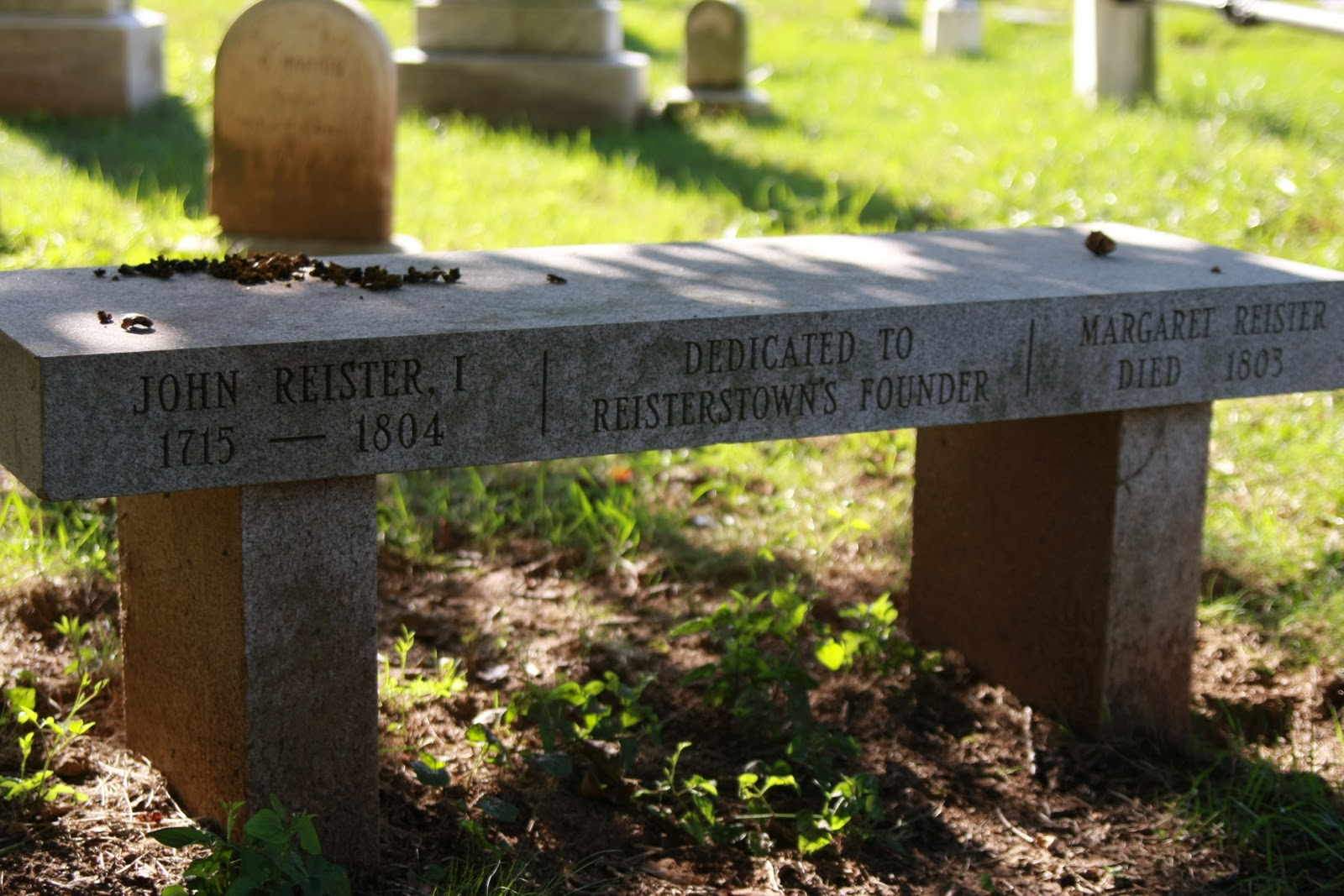
Bench dedicated to Reister in Reisterstown Community Cemetery

To meet their farming needs, Reister purchased an additional 83 acres (340,000 m^{2}) of land adjoining his property and named it Reister's Desire. By 1785, all of the Reister children had moved out on their own and settled around their father's inn. The town started to grow more rapidly at this point as the Reister children opened up businesses of their own in the surrounding area. John Reister, Jr. was married to Mary Yohn and moved into a house across from the inn where he worked as a blacksmith, carpenter, and a distiller of rye whiskey. Mary Reister also married a blacksmith named John Beckley who began operating in the area. Margaret Reister married Peter Trine, a tanner, and after a short while in the town moved back to York with her husband. Catherine Reister and her husband Roland Smith opened up the "Reister Store" near the inn and made available many everyday necessities. Philip Reister took over management of the inn with his wife Eve Gardner, and his sister Elizabeth married Henry Weist and opened up a tannery.

While the town originally catered to travelers, other businesses were soon attracted to the area and more land was eventually purchased for farming and the planting of an orchard. By 1787, town and state officials began referring to the town officially as Reister’s Town, and eventually simply Reisterstown.

John Reister lived out his life in Reisterstown and died at the age of 89 in 1804.
