= René Risser =

French mathematician, actuary, artillery officer, administrator, professor and inventor

René Nathan Risser (1869 in Thann, Haut-Rhin – 1958) was a French statistician, mathematician, actuary, artillery officer, government administrator, professor of actuarial science, and inventor.

== Education and career ==
Risser graduated from the École polytechnique in 1892 and then graduated from the École d'application de l'artillerie et du génie (School of application of artillery and of engineering) in the Arrondissement of Fontainebleau. In 1898 he became an employee of the Statistique générale de la France (French Bureau of Statistics) upon recommendations from Emmanuel Carvallo and Arthur Fontaine. Upon the advice of Lucien March, Risser oriented his career toward actuarial science and in 1907 joined the government ministry of Travail et de la Prévoyance sociale (labor and social welfare). Initially he was the Insurance Supervisory Commissioner and then became Chief Actuary of the ministry and a member of the board of the Institut des actuaires français. One of his notable appointees was Anatole Weber.

Risser was mobilized as an artillery officer in 1914. During WW I, he developed firing tables for artillery and developed a method of artillery fire in mountainous terrain when he was part of a French detachment to the Italian army in 1918. In 1925 he received from the University of Paris a doctorate in mathematics for his thesis on mechanics Essai sur la théorie des ondes par émersion. His thesis committee consisted of Gabriel Koenigs, Édouard Goursat, and Émile Borel. In 1927 Risser was appointed a professor of actuarial science and insurance at the École polytechnique, a position which he held until his retirement in 1937. In 1938 he was made an honorary professor of the Conservatoire national des arts et métiers (CNAM).

In 1911 Risser was awarded the Prix Montyon in statistics. He was an Invited Speaker of the ICM in 1924 in Toronto, in 1928 in Bologna, and in 1932 in Zurich.

== Selected publications ==
=== Articles ===
- "Coût de la loi sur les retraites ouvrières et paysannes pour le premier exercice." Journal de la société française de statistique 52 (1911): 385–415.
- "Exposé des principes de la statistique mathématique. Considérations générales." Journal de la société française de statistique 76 (1935): 281–318.
- "Chronique des banques et marchés monétaires." Journal de la société française de statistique 78 (1937): 75–79.
- "Rien et l'infini." Journal de la société française de statistique 89 (1948): 28–42.
- "A propos de l'application de la loi de Gauss." Journal de la société française de statistique 91 (1950): 210–218.

=== Books ===
- Les applications de la statistique à la démographie et à la biologie. Gauthier-Villars, 1932, 255 pages.
- with Claude Émile Traynard: Les principes de la statistique mathématique. Vol. 1. Gauthier-Villars, 1933, 338 pages.
