= Charles Joseph Bonaparte =

American lawyer and political activist (1851–1921)

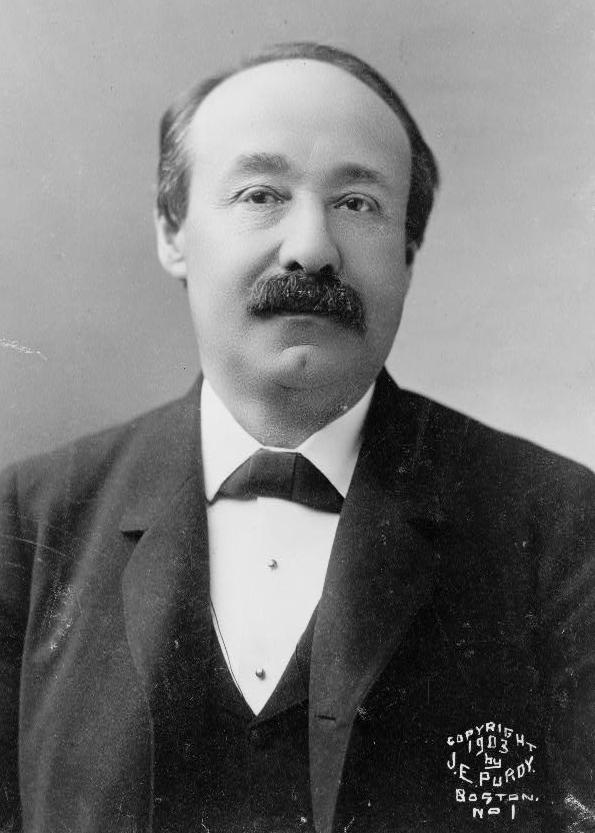
- Bonaparte, c. 1903

46th United States Attorney General
- In office December 17, 1906 – March 4, 1909
- President: Theodore Roosevelt
- Preceded by: William Moody
- Succeeded by: George W. Wickersham

37th United States Secretary of the Navy
- In office July 1, 1905 – December 16, 1906
- President: Theodore Roosevelt
- Preceded by: Paul Morton
- Succeeded by: Victor H. Metcalf

Personal details
- Born: Charles Joseph Bonaparte; June 9, 1851 Baltimore, Maryland, U.S.
- Died: June 28, 1921 (aged 70) Baltimore County, Maryland, U.S.
- Resting place: Loudon Park Cemetery
- Party: Republican
- Spouse: Ellen Channing Day (m. 1875)
- Parent(s): Jérôme Napoléon Bonaparte; Susan May Williams
- Relatives: See Bonaparte family
- Education: Harvard University (BA, LLB)

Charles Joseph Bonaparte (/ˈboʊnəpɑːrt/ BOH-nə-part; June 9, 1851 – June 28, 1921) was an American lawyer and political activist of French descent from the House of Bonaparte who advocated for progressive and liberal causes. Originally from Baltimore, Maryland, he served in the cabinet of the 26th U.S. president, Theodore Roosevelt.

His grandfather was Jérôme Bonaparte, brother of Emperor Napoleon I, and his grandmother was Elizabeth Patterson Bonaparte.

Bonaparte was the U.S. Secretary of the Navy and later the U.S. Attorney General. During his tenure as Attorney General, he formed the Bureau of Investigation (now the FBI). Bonaparte was one of the founders and for a time the president, of the National Municipal League. He was also an activist for the voting rights of black residents of his native city of Baltimore.

== Early life and education ==
Coat of Arms of Charles Joseph Bonaparte

Bonaparte was born in Baltimore, Maryland, on June 9, 1851, the son of Jérôme ("Bo") Napoleon Bonaparte (1805–1870), and Susan May Williams (1812–1881), from whom the American line of the House of Bonaparte descended, and a grandson of Jérôme Bonaparte, King of Westphalia, the youngest brother of French emperor Napoleon. However, the American Bonapartes never used any titles.

Bonaparte graduated from Harvard College in Cambridge, Massachusetts in 1871 and lived in Grays Hall during his freshman year. He was also the founding president of the Signet Society, a literary and art recognition final club at Harvard. He then continued to Harvard Law School, where he later served as a university overseer. He practiced law in Baltimore and became prominent in municipal and national reform movements.

== Career ==
In 1899, Bonaparte was the keynote speaker for the first graduating class of the Roman Catholic women's institution run by the Order of the School Sisters of Notre Dame, the College of Notre Dame of Maryland (now Notre Dame of Maryland University). He spoke on "The Significance of the Bachelor's Degree".

Bella Vista in 1907

Bonaparte lived in a townhouse in the north Baltimore neighborhood of Mount Vernon-Belvedere and had a country estate in suburban Baltimore County, Maryland, which surrounds the city on the west, north, and east. His home, Bella Vista, was designed by the architects James Bosley Noel Wyatt (1847–1926) and William G. Nolting (1866–1940), in the prominent local architectural partnership firm of Wyatt & Nolting in 1896. It lies east of the Harford Road (Maryland Route 147) in an area called Glen Arm. The house was not electrified since Bonaparte refused to have electricity or telegraph lines installed due to a dislike of technology, verified by his use of a horse-drawn coach until he died in the early 1920s.

=== Politics ===
Bonaparte was a founder of the Reform League of Baltimore, organized in 1885. The League gained a clean sweep of municipal elections in 1895: long-time minority progressive liberal Republicans ousted many Democratic machine politicians in heavily Democratic wards. The League men governed with clean hands for a brief time, providing a certain amount of efficient municipal government.

Bonaparte was a member of the Board of Indian Commissioners from 1902 to 1904, chairman of the National Civil Service Reform League in 1904, and appointed a trustee of Catholic University of America in Washington, D.C.

In the 1904 United States presidential election, Bonaparte was named one of eight Republican candidates for presidential elector. Maryland at this time chose electors individually, in an at-large election. In an unusual result, Bonaparte got the most votes of any candidate, narrowly outpolling the eight Democrat candidates, who narrowly outpolled the other seven Republicans. Thus Bonaparte was the only Republican elector from Maryland, which may have reflected his reputation.

In 1905, President Theodore Roosevelt appointed Bonaparte Secretary of the Navy. In 1906 Bonaparte moved to the office of Attorney General, which he held until the end of Roosevelt's term. He was active in suits brought against the trusts and initiated the suit which broke up the monopolistic American Tobacco Company. He became known as "Charlie, the Crook Chaser". In 1908, Bonaparte established a Bureau of Investigation (BOI) within the Department of Justice. The BOI later became the FBI.

In the 1912 United States presidential election, Bonaparte supported the Bull Moose Party of Theodore Roosevelt.

== Personal life ==
On September 1, 1875, in Newport, Rhode Island, Bonaparte married Ellen Channing Day (Hartford, Connecticut, September 25, 1852 – Washington, D.C., June 23, 1924), daughter of attorney Thomas Mills Day and wife Anna Jones Dunn. They had no children.

In 1903, he was awarded the Laetare Medal by the University of Notre Dame, the oldest and most prestigious award for American Catholics.

== Death ==
Bonaparte died in Bella Vista at age 70 and is interred at southwest Baltimore's landmark Loudon Park Cemetery. He died of "Saint Vitus' dance", a nonspecific term used at the time to refer to chorea. A nearby street in Baltimore County bears the name of Bonaparte Avenue.

After Bonaparte's death, the house was later owned by bootleggers Peter and Michael Kelly. After they left, it was destroyed in a fire caused by faulty wiring on January 20, 1933. The site was replaced by a poured concrete mansion, but a large carriage house, dating back to 1896, is still on the estate.

== Sources ==
- Bishop, Joseph Bucklin (1922). Charles Joseph Bonaparte: His Life and Public Services. New York: C. Scribner's Sons. LCCN 22024561. OCLC 3178193.
- Goldman, Eric F. (1943). Charles J. Bonaparte: Patrician Reformer, His Earlier Career. Baltimore: Johns Hopkins Press. LCCN 43014187. OCLC 639278.

Political offices
Preceded by Paul Morton	United States Secretary of the Navy; 1905–1906	Succeeded by Victor H. Metcalf
Legal offices
Preceded by William H. Moody	United States Attorney General; 1906–1909	Succeeded by George W. Wickersham
