= William Patterson (Maryland businessman) =

Irish-born American businessman (1752–1835)

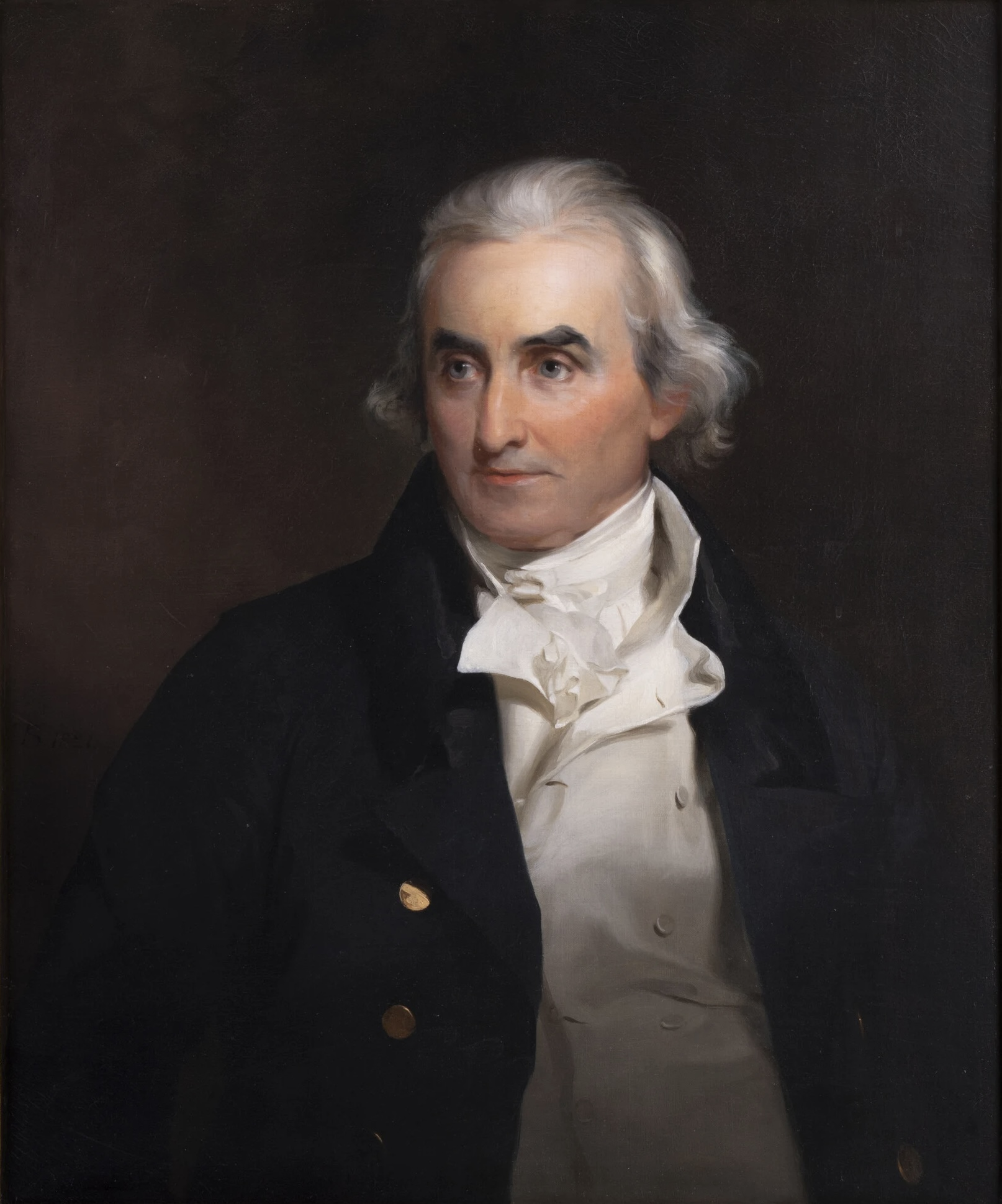
- portrait by Thomas Sully
- Born: November 1, 1752; County Donegal
- Died: February 7, 1835; Baltimore
- Occupation: Businessperson
- Spouse: Dorcas Spear
- Children: Elizabeth Patterson Bonaparte, Robert Patterson, Joseph Wilson Patterson

William Patterson (1752–1835) was an Irish-born American businessman, a gun-runner during the American Revolution, and a founder of the Baltimore and Ohio Railroad. His many business dealings included shipping, banking, and the Baltimore Water Company.

== Early life and career ==
Patterson was born in 1752 in Fanad, County Donegal, Ireland. He moved to Philadelphia as a penniless fourteen-year-old and set about making his fortune through grim determination and risk-taking. By making connections with older businessmen and merchants, he was able to buy two shares in ships transporting guns from Europe to the Americas. Patterson went along on the voyage. When the ships docked in the West Indies, he left the ship and saw a golden opportunity to roll his money into being a middleman by investing in warehouses where goods were stored before being shipped north to America. He returned to the United States and settled in Baltimore, which at the time was a quickly growing city with many opportunities in trade and business, thanks to its harbor and Mid-Atlantic location. He married into the respectable Spear-Smith family and built a grand townhouse on South Street next to his counting house. Once settled into his business, the risk-taking that had formed his youth mellowed, and he became a cautious, conservative businessman.

Patterson was a founder of the Baltimore and Ohio Railroad. He was also a founder of the Merchants Exchange, the first president of the Bank of Maryland, and a founder of the Canton Company, a business established in 1828 by Patterson and Peter Cooper, most remembered for inventing and manufacturing the Tom Thumb steam locomotive.

Patterson was reputed to be the second-wealthiest man in Maryland, after Charles Carroll of Carrollton. He was a slave owner who owned several plantations and country estates in the Baltimore area, along with buildings and lots within the city, and branches of his business that reached all the way to the European continent.

== Personal life ==
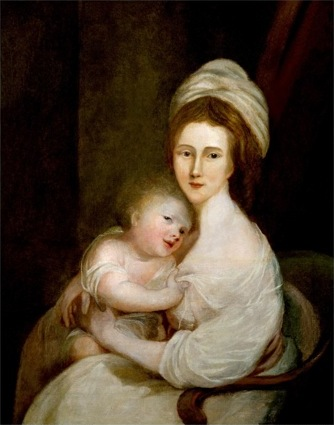
Dorcas Spear Patterson with Elizabeth Patterson as a baby

Patterson was married to Dorcas Spear (1761–1814), a member of the respected Spear-Smith family. Together, they were the parents of thirteen children, including eight sons and five daughters:

- William Patterson Jr. (1780–1808)
- Robert Patterson (1781–1822), who married Marianne Caton, the maternal granddaughter of Carroll, after Robert's death she married Richard Wellesley, 1st Marquess Wellesley, brother of Arthur Wellesley, 1st Duke of Wellington.
- John Patterson (1783–1851)
- Elizabeth Patterson (1785–1879), who married Jérôme Bonaparte, brother of Napoleon Bonaparte.
- Joseph Wilson Patterson (1786–1866)
- Edward Patterson (1789–1865), who married Sidney Smith (1794–1879), daughter of Maj. Gen. Samuel Smith. Edward served in the War of 1812 as aide-de-camp to Isaac McKim and was the maternal grandfather of Sidney Turner Swan Dyer (1858–1933) who married Elisha Dyer III, son and grandson of Rhode Island governors, Elisha Dyer Jr. and Elisha Dyer.
- Augusta Sophia Patterson (1791–1793), died in infancy.
- Margaretta Patterson (1793–1811), died aged 18.
- George Patterson (1796–1869)
- Caroline Patterson (1798–1814), died aged 16.
- Henry Patterson (1800–1858)
- Octavius Patterson (1802–1814), died aged 12.
- Mary Ann Jeromia Patterson (1804–1807), died in infancy.

Patterson died a millionaire in 1835 in Baltimore. In his will, he freed all of his slaves when each reached the age of 30, and left the majority of his estate to his sons and grandson. He wrote, "The conduct of my daughter Betsey has through life been so disobedient that in no instance has she every consulted my opinions or feelings; indeed, she has caused me more anxiety and trouble than all my other children put together, and her folly and misconduct have occasioned me a train of expense that first and last has cost me much money," and left her only a few properties, all of which totaled approximately $10,000. He left an annual allowance to Nancy Spear predicated upon her agreement to never again attend congressional sessions in Washington, D.C. The will was published in the Baltimore Sun, most likely arranged by Patterson before he died. The will violated the prenuptial agreement Elizabeth Patterson and Jerome Bonaparte signed in 1803, in which Patterson would bequeath a share to Elizabeth that was equal to that of his other children. Although Elizabeth Patterson initially contested the will, she ultimately dropped all legal challenges when she learned that her aunt and trusted confidante Nancy Spear sold Elizabeth's letters to her brothers to be used against her in court and in public opinion.

Patterson was known to be a strict father. He had one illegitimate daughter, to whom he also left part of his estate, as well as to her mother.

=== Philanthropy and legacy ===
In 1827, Patterson donated the first five acres of land that became Baltimore's Patterson Park. The park, its namesake street (Patterson Park Avenue) and a high school to the east of it are named in his honor.

Patterson's property in Sykesville, known as "Springfield", was inherited for generations before landing in the hands of Frank Brown (former governor of Maryland). Brown sold the property (1,300 acres) to the state of Maryland in 1896. That same year, Springfield State Hospital was created as Maryland's second hospital for the mentally ill. It grew to become the largest institution of its kind on the east coast.
