= Elizabeth Patterson Bonaparte =

American socialite (1785– 1879)

Elizabeth Bonaparte
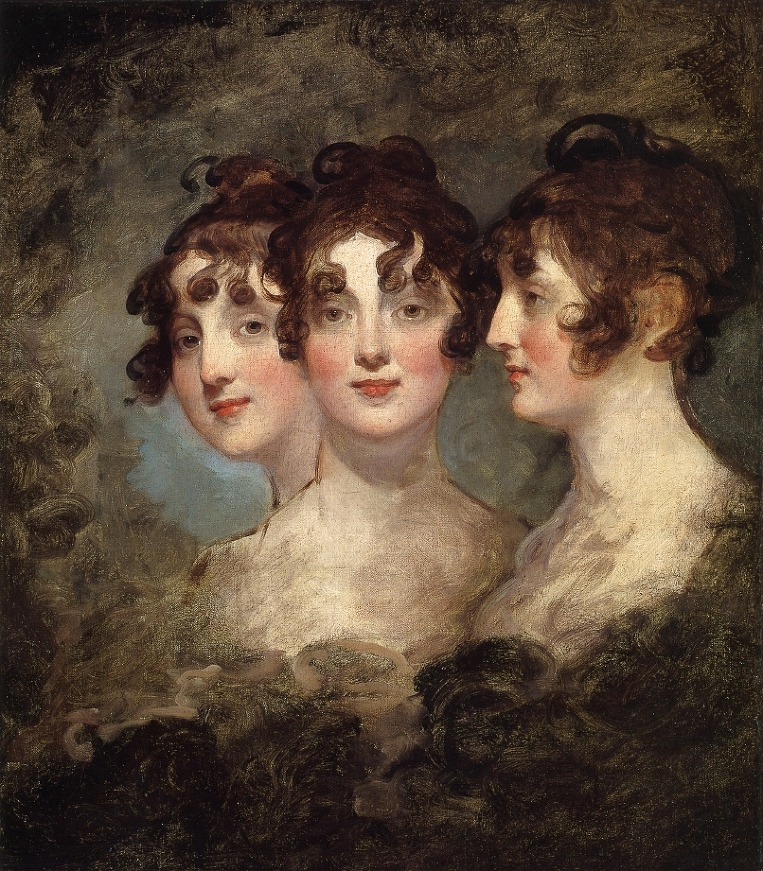
- Triple portrait, 1804
- Born: February 6, 1785; Baltimore, Maryland, U.S.
- Died: April 4, 1879 (aged 94); Baltimore, Maryland, U.S.
- Resting place: Green Mount Cemetery
- Spouse: Jérôme Bonaparte (m. 1803; ann. 1806)
- Children: Jérôme Napoleon Bonaparte
- Parent(s): William Patterson; Dorcas Spear Patterson
- Relatives: Jerome Napoleon Bonaparte II (grandson); Charles Joseph Bonaparte (grandson)

Elizabeth Patterson Bonaparte (February 6, 1785 – April 4, 1879) was an American socialite. She was the daughter of Baltimore merchant William Patterson and the first wife of Jérôme Bonaparte, Napoleon's youngest brother.

== Early life ==
Patterson was born in Baltimore, Maryland, on February 6, 1785. She was the daughter of Dorcas (née Spear) Patterson and William Patterson, the oldest daughter of 13 children. Her mother was the daughter of a Baltimore flour merchant, and her father, an Irish-born Presbyterian who came to North America from Donegal before the Revolutionary War, was the second wealthiest man in Maryland after Charles Carroll of Carrollton.

Although writers and journalists refer to her as Betsy, Patterson never used this name, and only her father with whom she had a contentious relationship used it; she always signed her name as Elizabeth, and Jérôme Bonaparte referred to her in all his letters with the French Élisabeth, Élisa or Elsa. Patterson was considered one of the more beautiful women in Baltimore and became known for her risqué and French taste in fashion.

Elizabeth's brother, Robert Patterson, married Carroll's granddaughter, Marianne Caton. After Robert's death, his widow Marianne married Richard Wellesley, 1st Marquess Wellesley, the older brother of Arthur Wellesley, 1st Duke of Wellington. Her other brothers, Joseph and Edward Patterson, were the owners of Joppa Iron Works in eastern Baltimore County on the Gunpowder River.

== Personal life ==
In 1803, Patterson met Jérôme Bonaparte on his visit to the United States; he had delayed his return to France to postpone facing the wrath of his brother Napoleon for a military incident in the Caribbean between his ship and a British ship. Several stories of their first meeting circulated, but Patterson later said that they met at a dinner at a friend's house. A romance soon blossomed. Despite an anonymous letter to Patterson's father which claimed that Bonaparte only planned to marry her in order to waste time until he returned to France, Patterson insisted on the marriage, going so far as to threaten to elope if she did not have her father's blessing. On Christmas Eve, 1803, Patterson married Jérôme Bonaparte in a ceremony presided over by John Carroll, the first Catholic bishop of Baltimore.

Napoleon ordered his brother back to France and demanded that the marriage be annulled. Jérôme ignored Napoleon's initial demand that he return without his wife. In the fall of 1804, Jérôme and a pregnant Elizabeth attempted to travel to France in time for his brother's coronation, but a number of false starts delayed them. When they finally arrived, Elizabeth was denied permission to set foot on continental Europe by order of Napoleon. Jérôme traveled to Italy in an attempt to reason with his brother, writing to his wife, "My dearest Elsa, I will do everything that must be done," but she never saw him again except for a brief eye-to-eye contact in 1822 in a chance encounter at Pitti Palace in Florence (although, like many stories of her life, historians cannot prove this meeting took place).

After being prevented upon Napoleon's orders from disembarking in either France or the Netherlands, she gave birth to a son, Jérôme Napoleon Bonaparte (1805–1870), on July 5, 1805, at 95 Camberwell Grove in Camberwell, London. Despite letters to his wife that he would remain steadfast and not abandon her, Jérôme acquiesced to his brother and was rewarded by being made an admiral in the French navy, a general in the army, an imperial prince and eventually king of Westphalia. He married the German princess Catharina of Württemberg on August 22, 1807, in the Royal Palace at Fontainebleau, France.

His marriage to Patterson had been annulled in France by machinations carried out by Napoleon in October 1806 despite the Pope's unwillingness to annul the marriage.

After her son, whom she called Bo, was born, Patterson returned to Baltimore with him and lived with her father, while she continued to use her royal connection to support herself and her son. She wrote to Napoleon and convinced him to grant her an allowance, which she used to support herself after her father claimed what little money and goods Jerome had sent her from Europe before their marriage was annulled. After the Battle of Waterloo, she returned to Europe, where she reportedly was well received in the most exclusive circles and much admired for her beauty and wit.

=== Divorce and last years ===
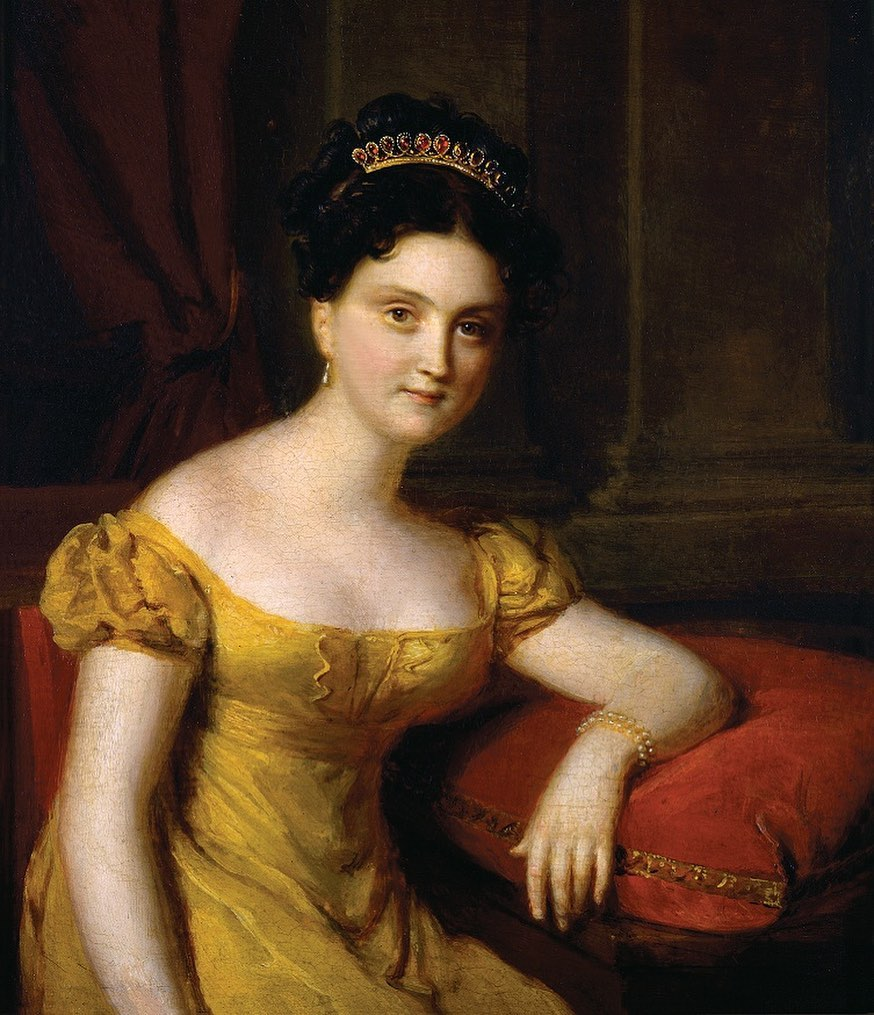
Portrait of Elizabeth Patterson Bonaparte by Firmin Massot, 1823.

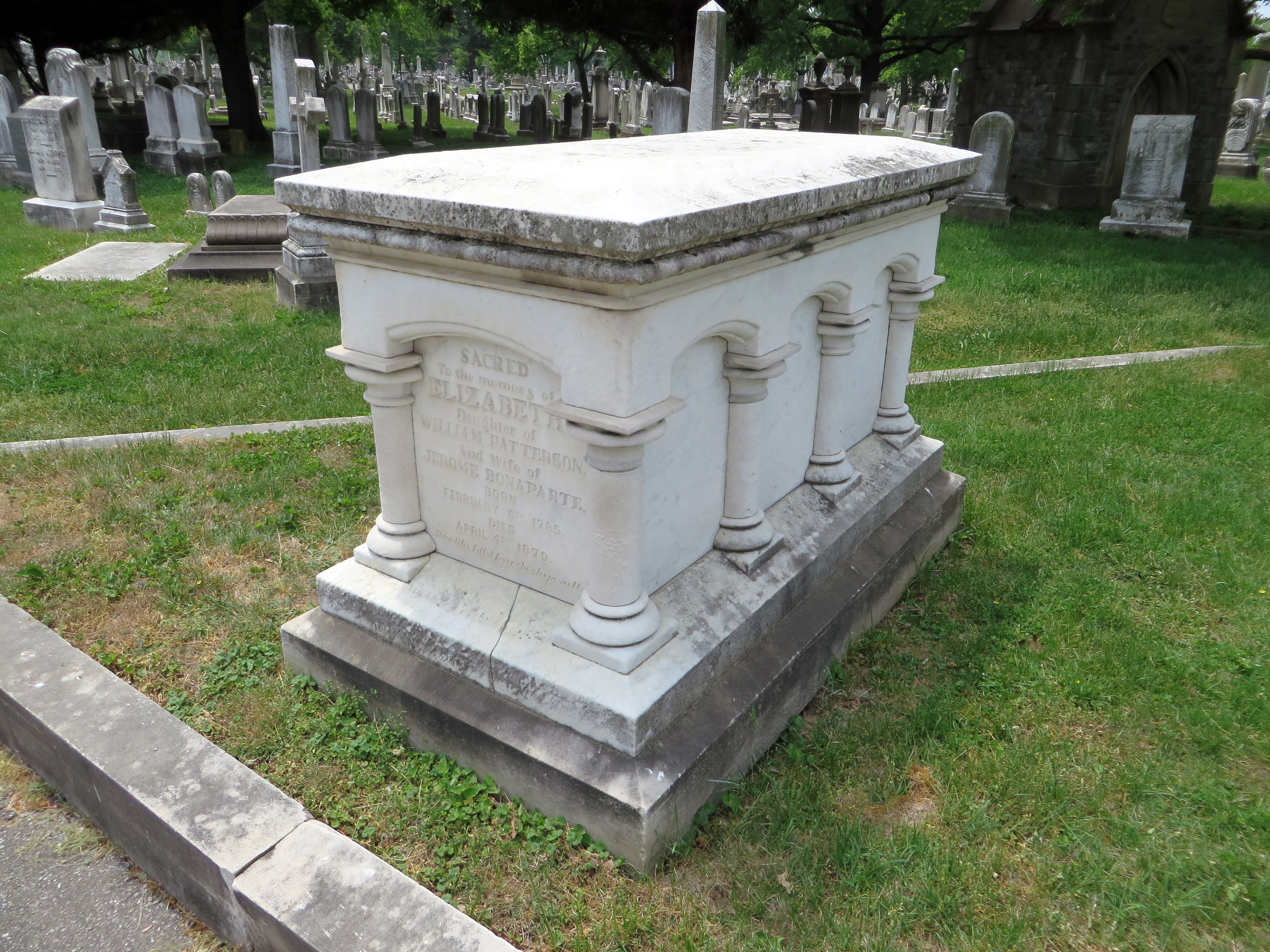
Elizabeth Patterson Bonaparte's tombstone

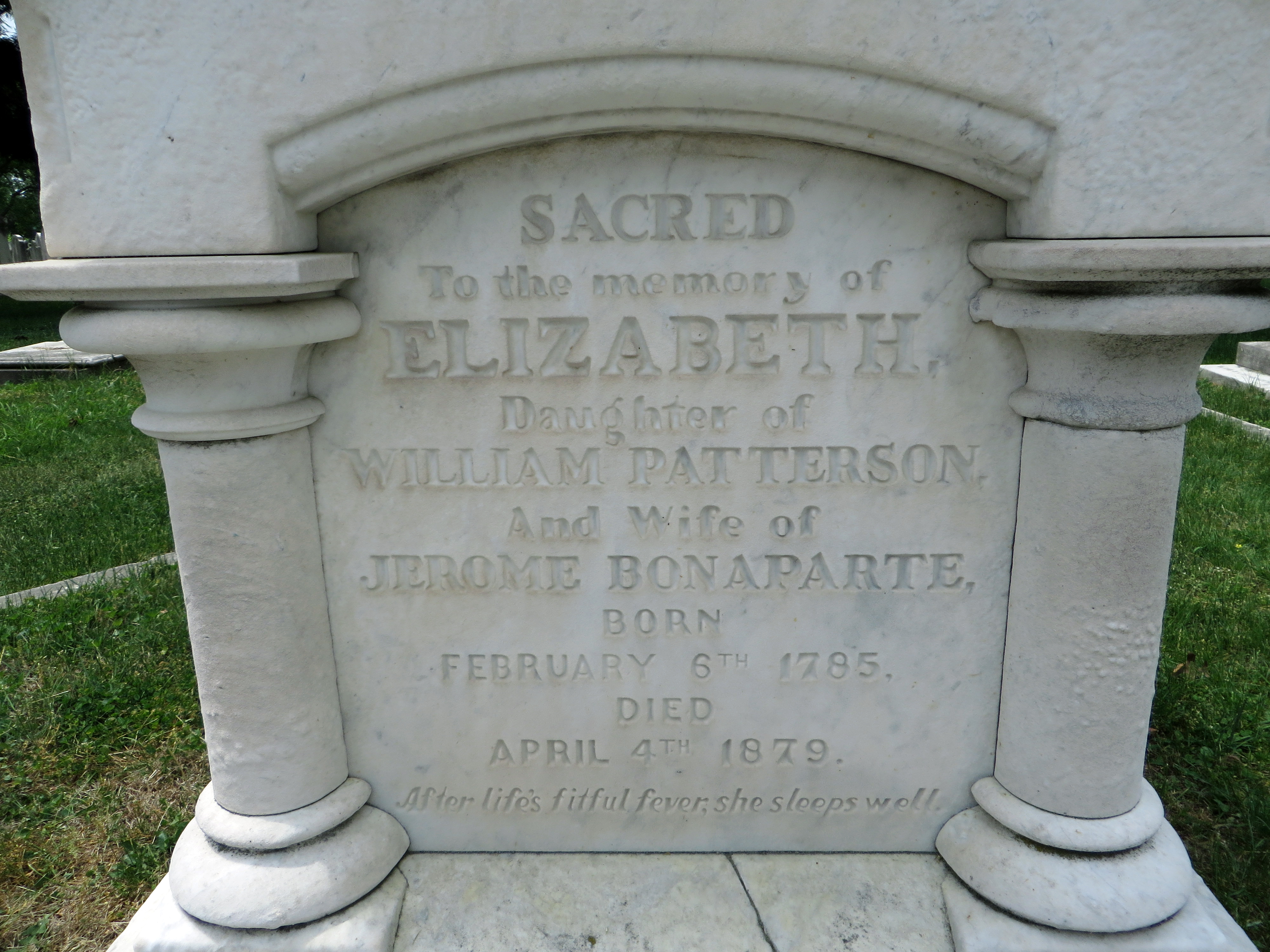
Front of her tombstone

In 1815, by special act of the Legislature of Maryland, Patterson secured a divorce. She returned to Europe again in 1819 with her son Bo, whom she enrolled in school in Geneva. She traveled to Rome during the winter of 1821–1822 at the behest of Pauline Bonaparte, who had hinted at making a financial settlement upon Bo. This news was welcome for Elizabeth as Jerome refused to provide for her and their son. After a failed attempt by Elizabeth and the Bonaparte women to arrange a marriage between Bo and Joseph Bonaparte's youngest daughter Charlotte, she left Rome and returned to Geneva. During a stop in Florence, she visited the Pitti Palace, where she accidentally met Jerome and his second wife Catharina. The two did not speak, but witnesses confirmed that they saw each other and that Jerome was reported as telling Catharina that Elizabeth was his "American wife." Jerome quickly left Florence shortly after the encounter. The two never saw each other again.

Elizabeth split the following decades between Europe and Baltimore, then finally returned to Baltimore. The rifts that had been present between Elizabeth and her family all her life were exacerbated by her marriage and her choices to pursue celebrity in both America and Europe rather than to be an obedient daughter. Her father's rebuke of her in his will and a feud between her and her brothers over her father's estate caused her permanent ostracism from the Patterson family. Her family strife was compounded by her anger at Bo's choice of American heiress Susan May Williams for a wife, a rift that never was resolved.

In 1861, she filed an inheritance claim in the Tribunal of First Instance at Paris after her former husband, Prince Jérôme, died on June 24, 1860, disputing Jérôme's son Prince Napoléon. The Tribunal of the Seine eventually ruled that the "demands of Madame Elizabeth Patterson and her son, Jerome Bonaparte, are not admissible, and must be rejected."

Her last years were spent in Baltimore in the management of her estate, the value of which she increased to $1.5 million. She lived her last years in a Baltimore boarding house despite having enough money to have purchased a fine home. At the end of her life, she commented, "Once I had everything but money; now I have nothing but money."

Patterson died on April 4, 1879, in Baltimore in the midst of a court battle over whether the state of Maryland could tax her out-of-state bonds. The case reached the Supreme Court (Bonaparte v. Tax Court, 104 U.S. 592). The court decided in favor of Maryland. She was interred in Green Mount Cemetery in Baltimore. Her tomb bears an epitaph: "After life's fitful fever she sleeps well."

=== Descendants ===
Her son married Susan May Williams in 1829 and had two children, Jerome Napoleon Bonaparte II (1830–1893) and Charles Joseph Bonaparte (1851–1921), who became Theodore Roosevelt's Secretary of the Navy in 1905 and the U.S. Attorney General in 1906. Her granddaughter Louise Eugénie Bonaparte (1883-1923) married Count Adam von Moltke-Huitfeldt (1864-1944). All Patterson's direct descendants now live in Europe, and all of them belong to the Scandinavian aristocracy.

== In popular culture ==
The story of Elizabeth and Jérôme's marriage and annulment is the basis for the 1908 play Glorious Betsy by Rida Johnson Young and the two film adaptations, Glorious Betsy (1928) and Hearts Divided (1936). She was portrayed by Dolores Costello in the former and by Marion Davies in the latter. The episode "Duty" of the Hornblower television series features Elizabeth (played by Camilla Power) and Jérôme trying to land in France, and the diplomatic difficulties. A historical novel about her life, The Ambitious Madame Bonaparte by Ruth Hull Chatlien, was published in 2013.

Alexandra Deutsch, director of Collections and Interpretation at the Maryland Historical Society, analyzed Elizabeth Patterson Bonaparte's personal belongings and letters in the 2016 book A Woman of Two Worlds: Elizabeth Patterson Bonaparte.
