= Shtandart (frigate, 1999) =

Replica of the first ship of Russia's Baltic fleet

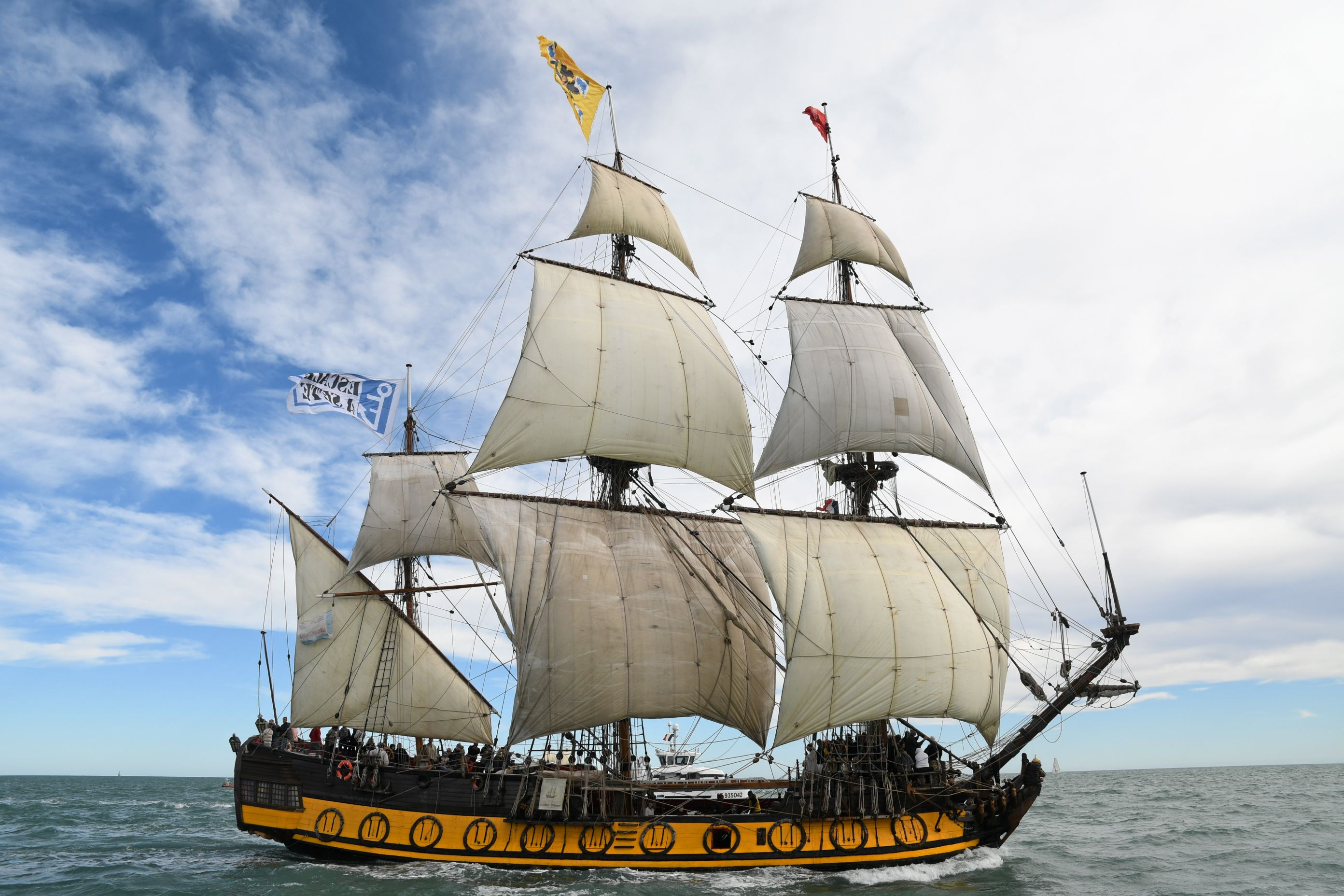
- Shtandart under sail in Sète, 2024

History

Cook Islands
- Name: TS Shtandart
- Namesake: Frigate (1703), imperial yacht ship
- Owner: Martus T.V.
- Builder: Vladimir Martus
- Laid down: November 4, 1994
- Launched: September 4, 1999
- Commissioned: June 25, 2000
- Identification: MMSI number: 518999255; Callsign: E5U5236
- Status: Sail training vessel

General characteristics (typical)
- Class & type: replica 28-gun frigate,
- Displacement: 220 tons
- Length: 34.5 m (113 ft) (overall), 25.88 m (84.9 ft) (registered length)
- Beam: 7.0 m (23.0 ft)
- Height: 33 m (108 ft) mainmast
- Draft: 3.0–3.3 m (9.8–10.8 ft)
- Decks: Berth, Gun, Spar
- Propulsion: Sail (three masts, ship rig), 1999: add 2 х Volvo Penta TAMD 122P, 560 hp (420 kW)
- Sail plan: 620 m^{2} (6,700 sq ft) on three masts
- Speed: 11 knots (20 km/h)
- Complement: 1703: 120 seamen, 1999: 40 seamen
- Armament: 7 modern saluting guns (original of 1703 had 28 guns)

The frigate Shtandart (Russian: Штандартъ) is a modern replica of the first ship of Russia's Baltic fleet. The original ship was launched in 1703 at the Olonetsky shipyard near Olonets by the decree of Tsar Peter I and orders issued by commander Aleksandr Menshikov. The name Shtandart was also given to the royal yachts of the tsars until the Russian Revolution in 1917. Tsar Nicholas II's royal yacht was last of this series.

== Background ==
On January 22, 1702, at the height of the Third Northern War, Peter the Great ordered the construction of the Shtandart (Russian: Штандартъ) . The ship, a 28-gun frigate, was the first part of Russia's later Baltic Fleet. She was responsible for repelling the Swedish naval attack on Saint Petersburg in 1705.

The original was designed by Peter the Great himself, after his trip to Netherlands and England. Completed in August 1703 by the Dutch master Vibe Gerense and then, with Peter as captain, sailed to St. Petersburg to be baptized. The ship was named Shtandart, after a new Royal standard showing all four seas to which Russia now had access.

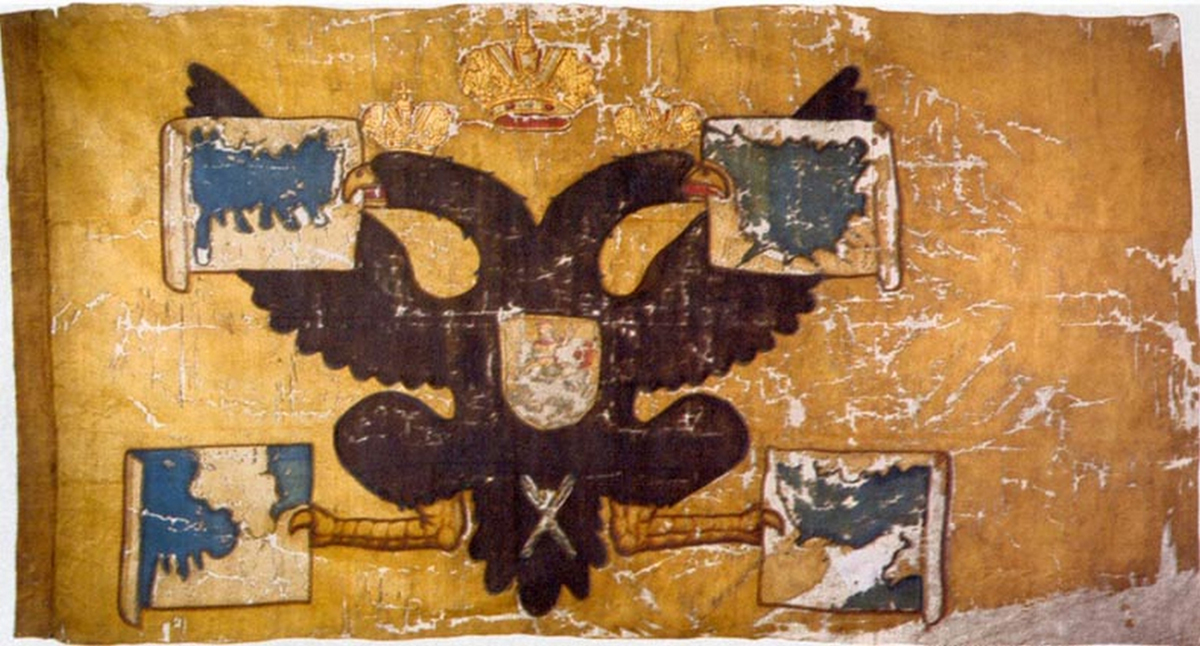
Image of the original flag, used by Peter the Great.

It served in the Third Northern War and was the flagship of the Russian Navy for 16 years. After it was retired in 1719, it remained in the Kronverk Canal behind the Peter and Paul Fortress in Saint Petersburg. In 1728 it was so dilapidated that the hull broke into pieces during lifting. Tsarina Catharina the First gave orders to build a replica, but they were not carried out at the time.

== History ==
Saint Petersburg would celebrate its 300th anniversary in 2003. In 1988 the management of the Hermitage Museum commissioned maritime researcher Viktor Krainukov to construct an exposition model of the first ship built at that time, namely the flagship of Peter the Great: the Shtandart.

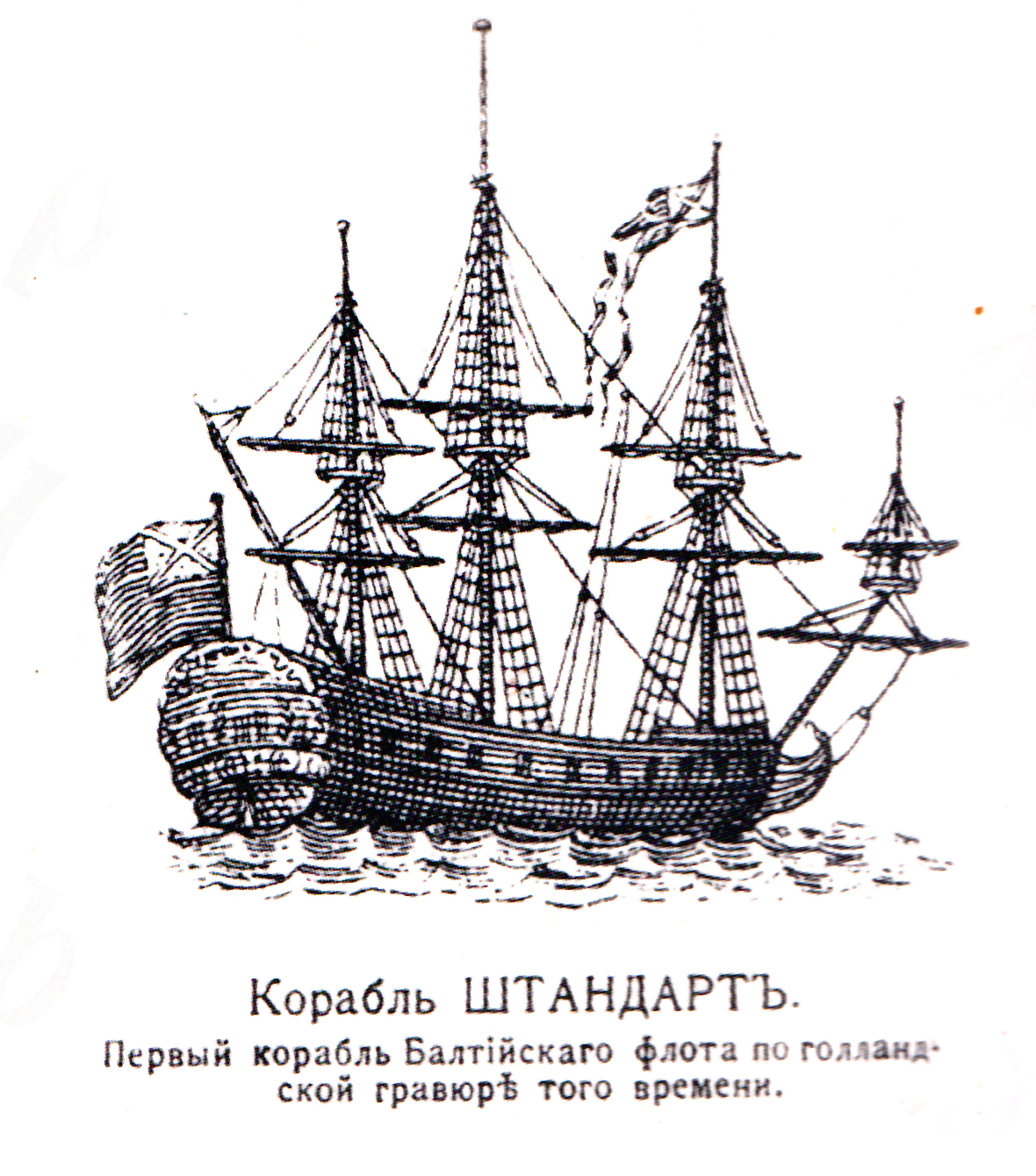
freely translated: "The ship Shtandart-the first ship of the Baltic fleet, after Dutch engravings of the time" (1705)

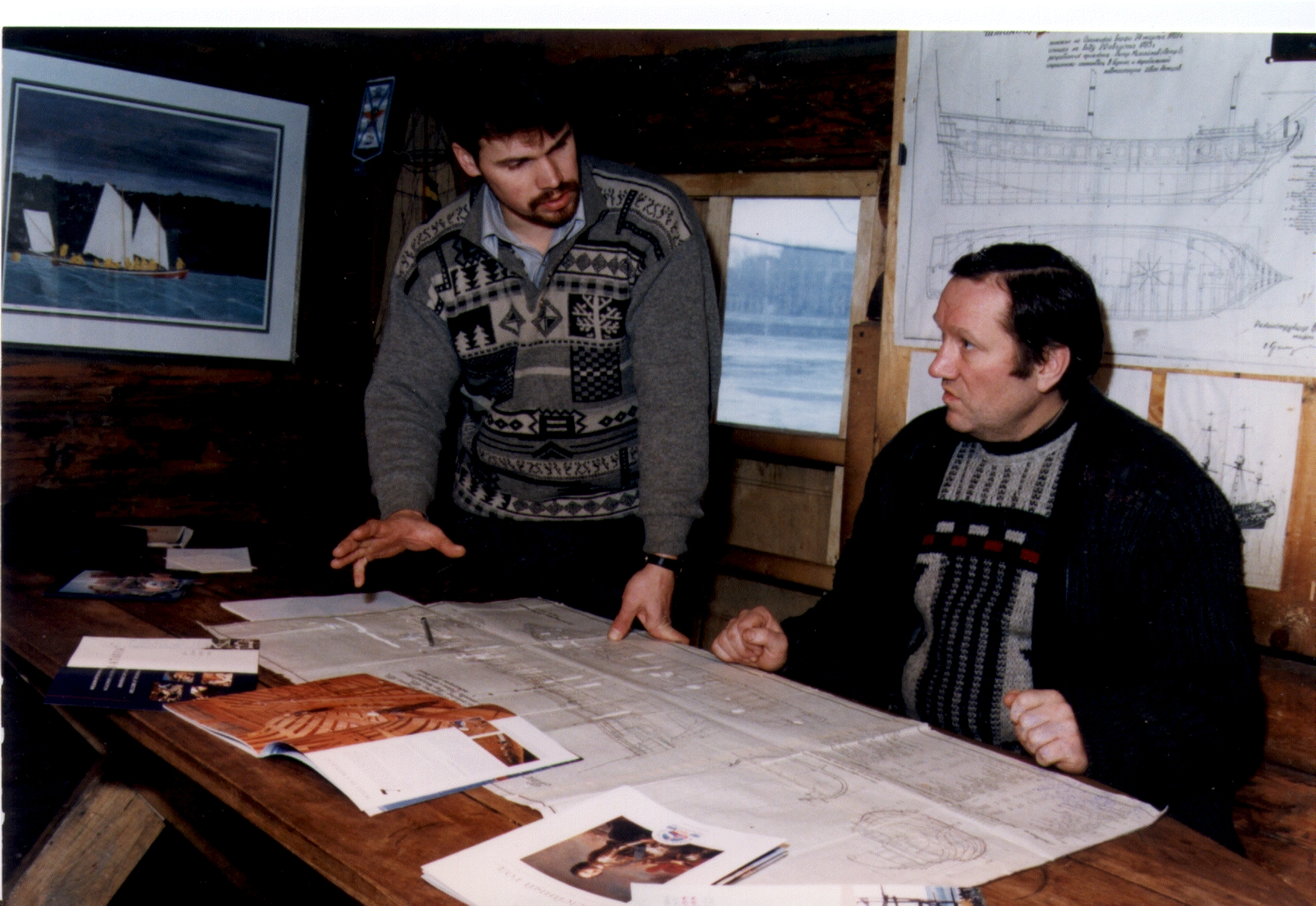
Vladimir Martus and historian Viktor Krainukov with Shtandart drawings

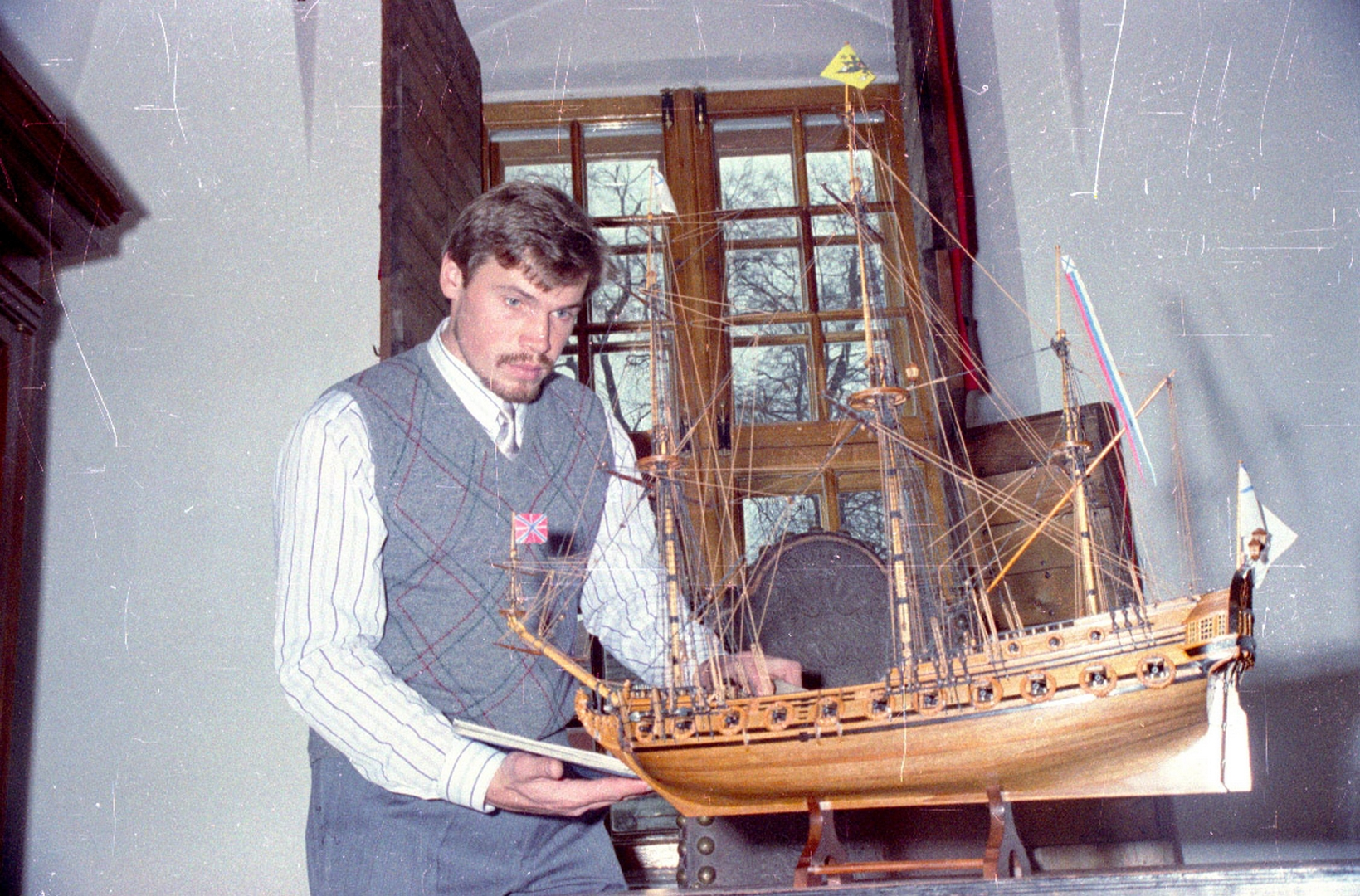
Martus with the model of the Shtandart

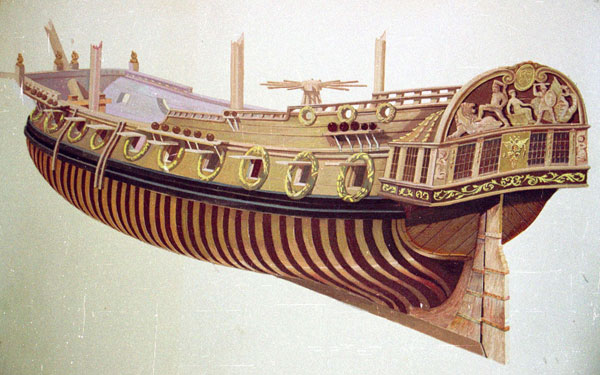
Artists' impression of the model study for the construction

=== 1992 ===
There was very little data, but after extensive research, he made a set of construction drawings and the model. When Vladimir Martus, driving force behind the Maritime Training Center, first saw that model of the imperial warship in the city's Menshikov Palace in 1992, he promised to let her sail again.
"On the moment I saw it, I fell in love," he said."

=== 1993 ===
==== Construction planning ====
In November 1994, 275 years after it sailed for the last time, the actual reconstruction of the Shtandart was finally able to start.

Martous drew up plans for recreating the Shtandart. Construction drawings were made with the help of researchers such as Greg Palmer, ship historian and Viktor Krainukov, expert on Russian shipbuilding history.

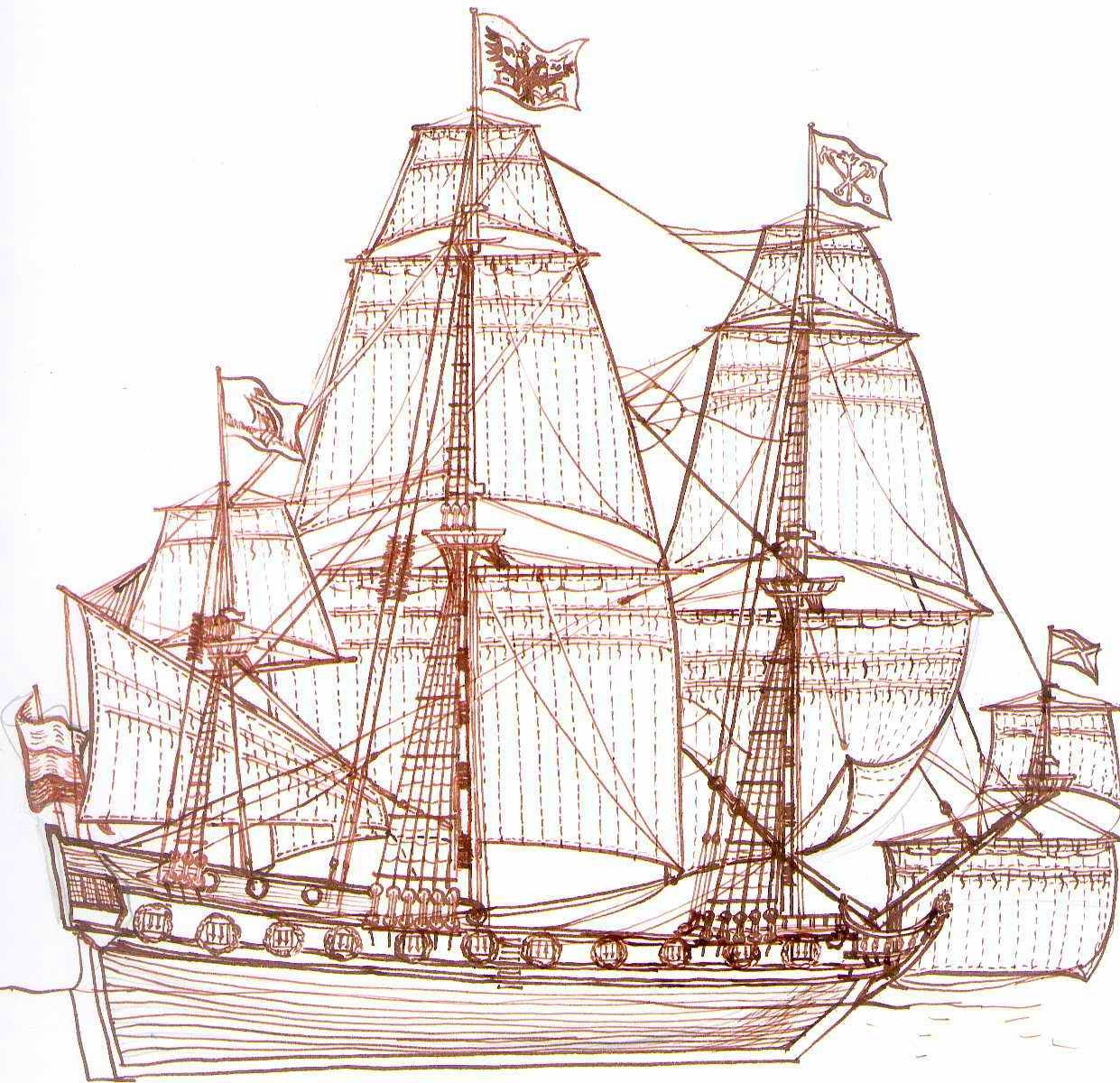
Artist impression of the fully dressed Shtandart

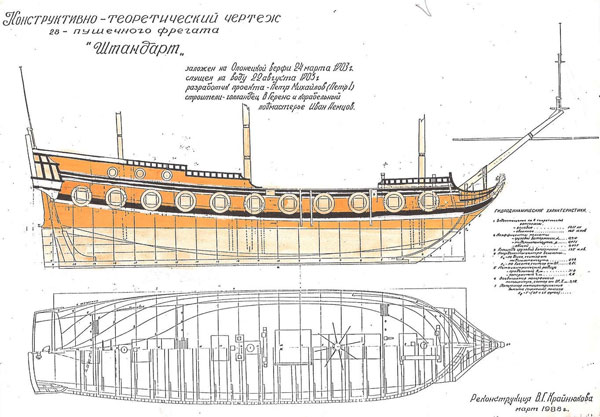
Empty ship's hull with color proposal

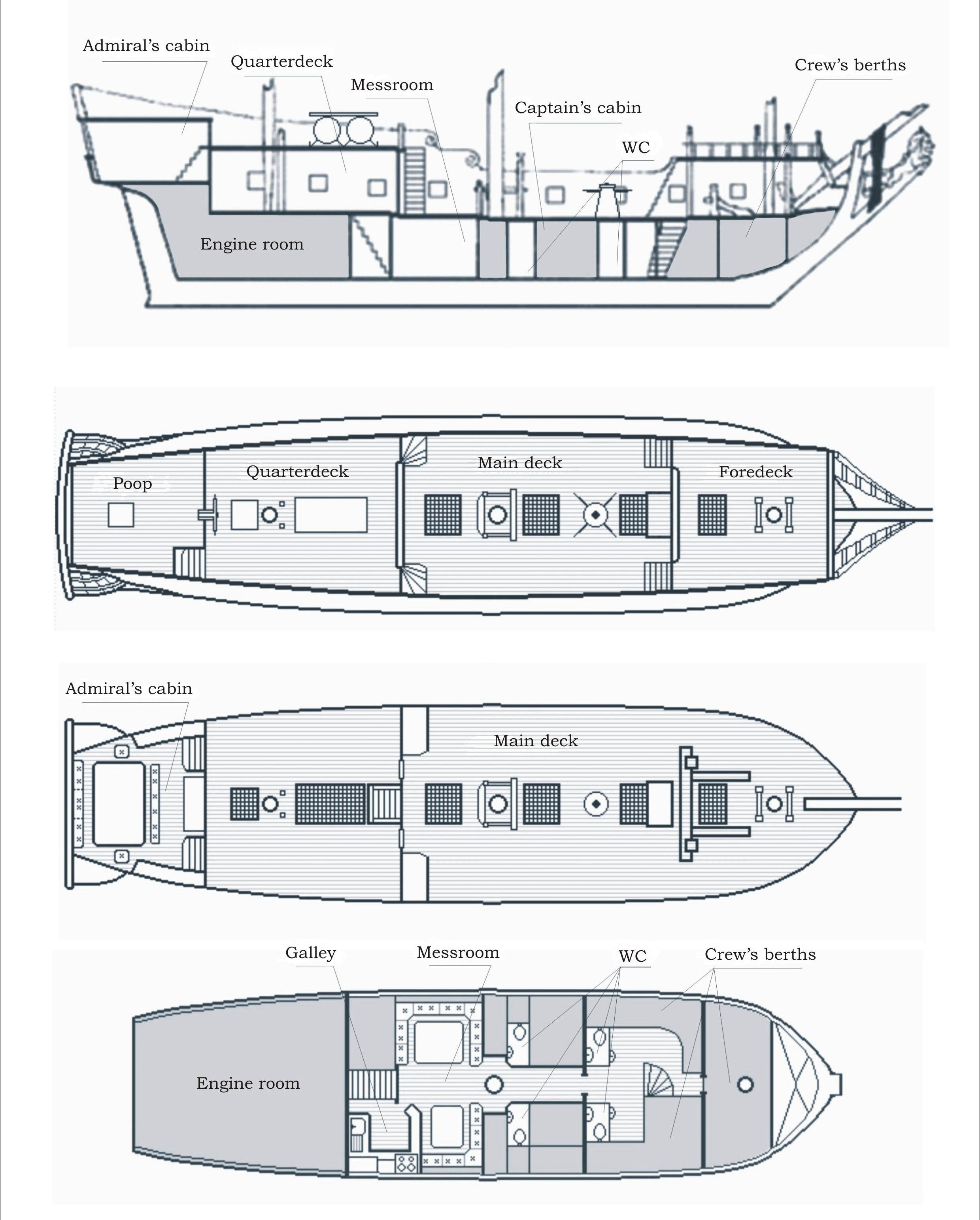
Section of the designed Shtandart hull with layout

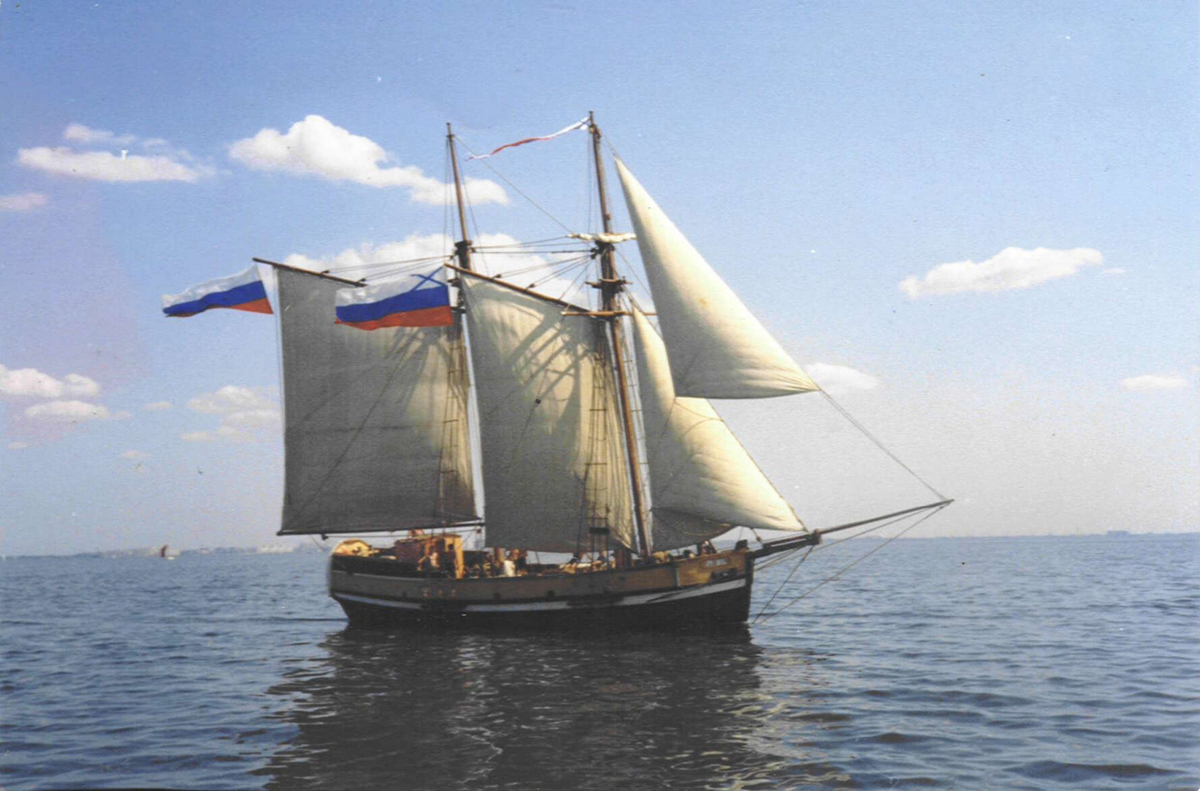
St Peter, first ship under (the new) Russian naval flag with Andrew's cross

=== 1994 ===
He worked on the Batavia Dock in Lelystad under the direction of Willem Vos and used his own experience in the construction of an earlier ship, the St. Peter, which he built especially to visit the "Fêtes maritimes de Douarnenez " of 1992, and that he had sold to finance the construction of the Shtandart.

==== Construction ====
The team used the same materials and methods as the original flagship.

==== Keel and frames ====
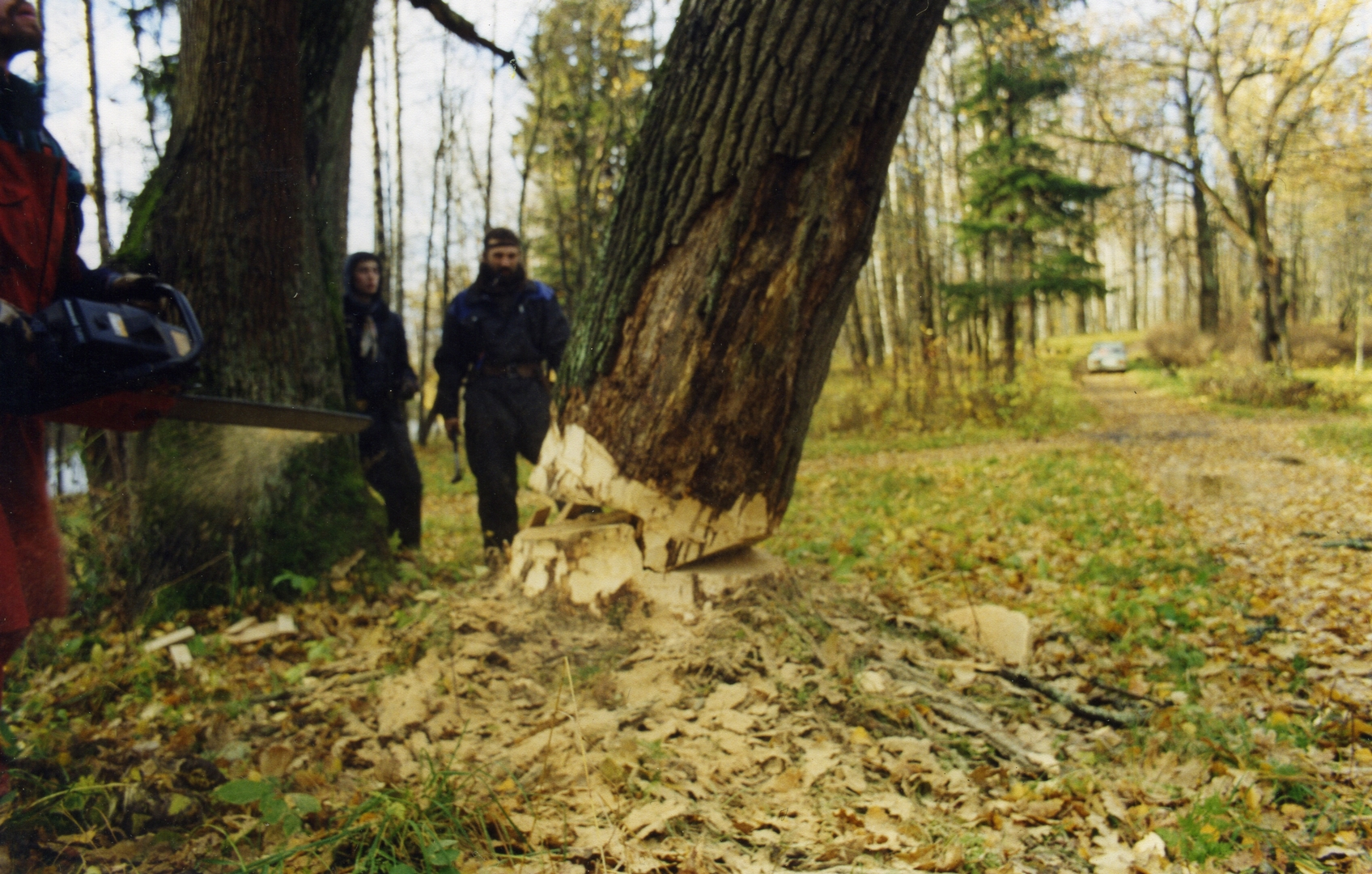
The first oak tree for the keel

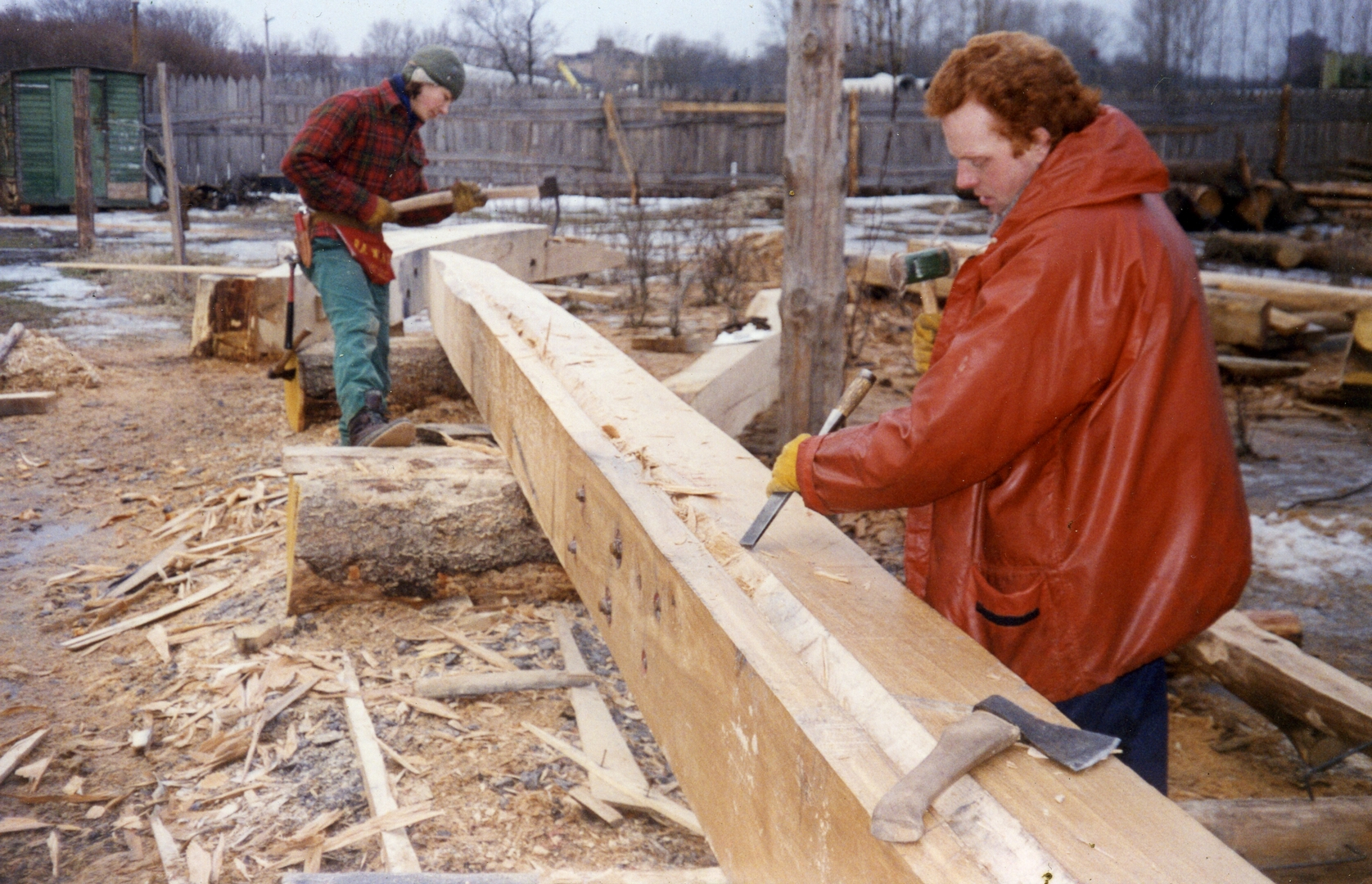
Hard work on the keel beam with rebates for the skin

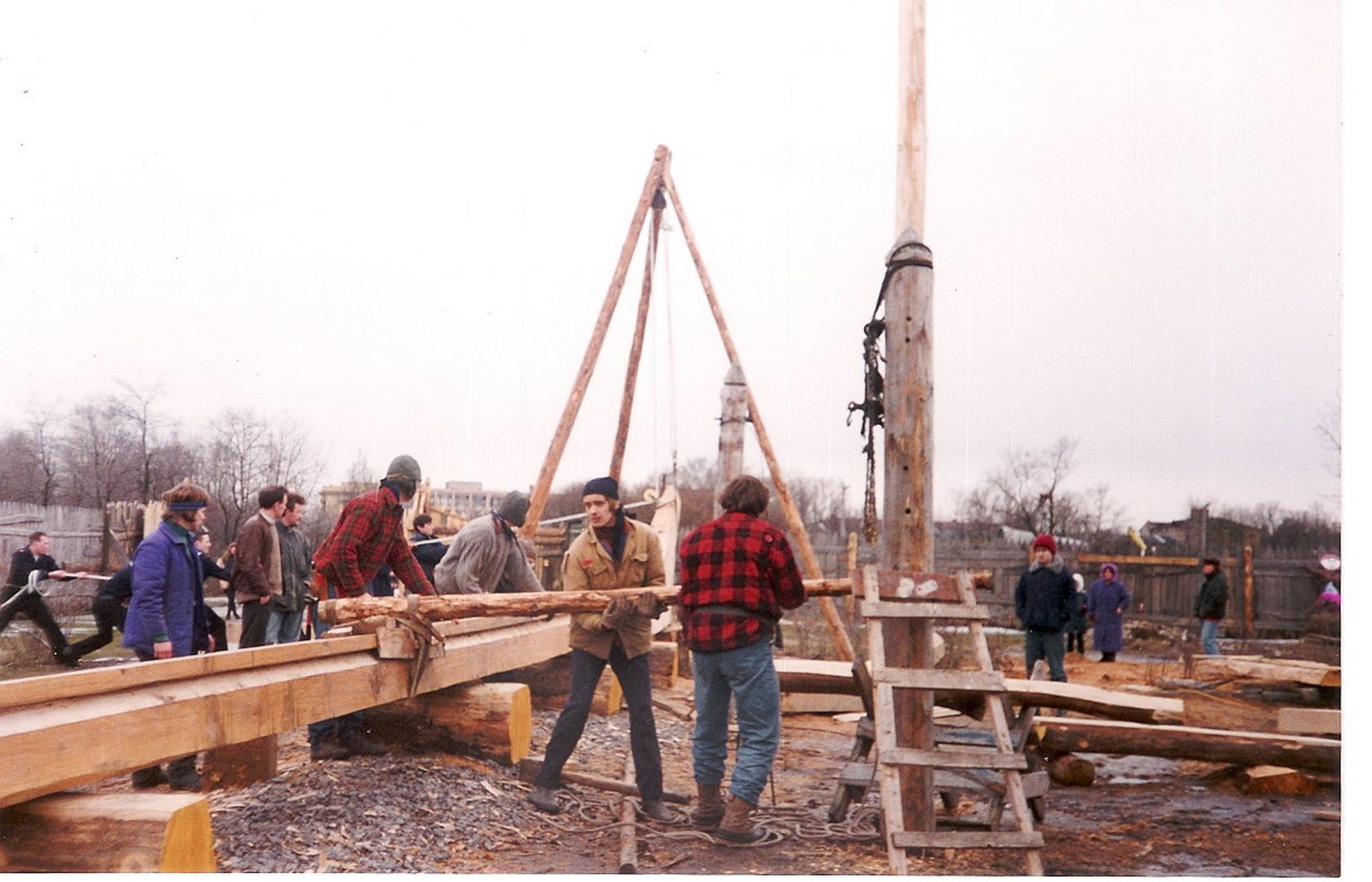
Keel laying with "many hands, light work" on November 4, 1994

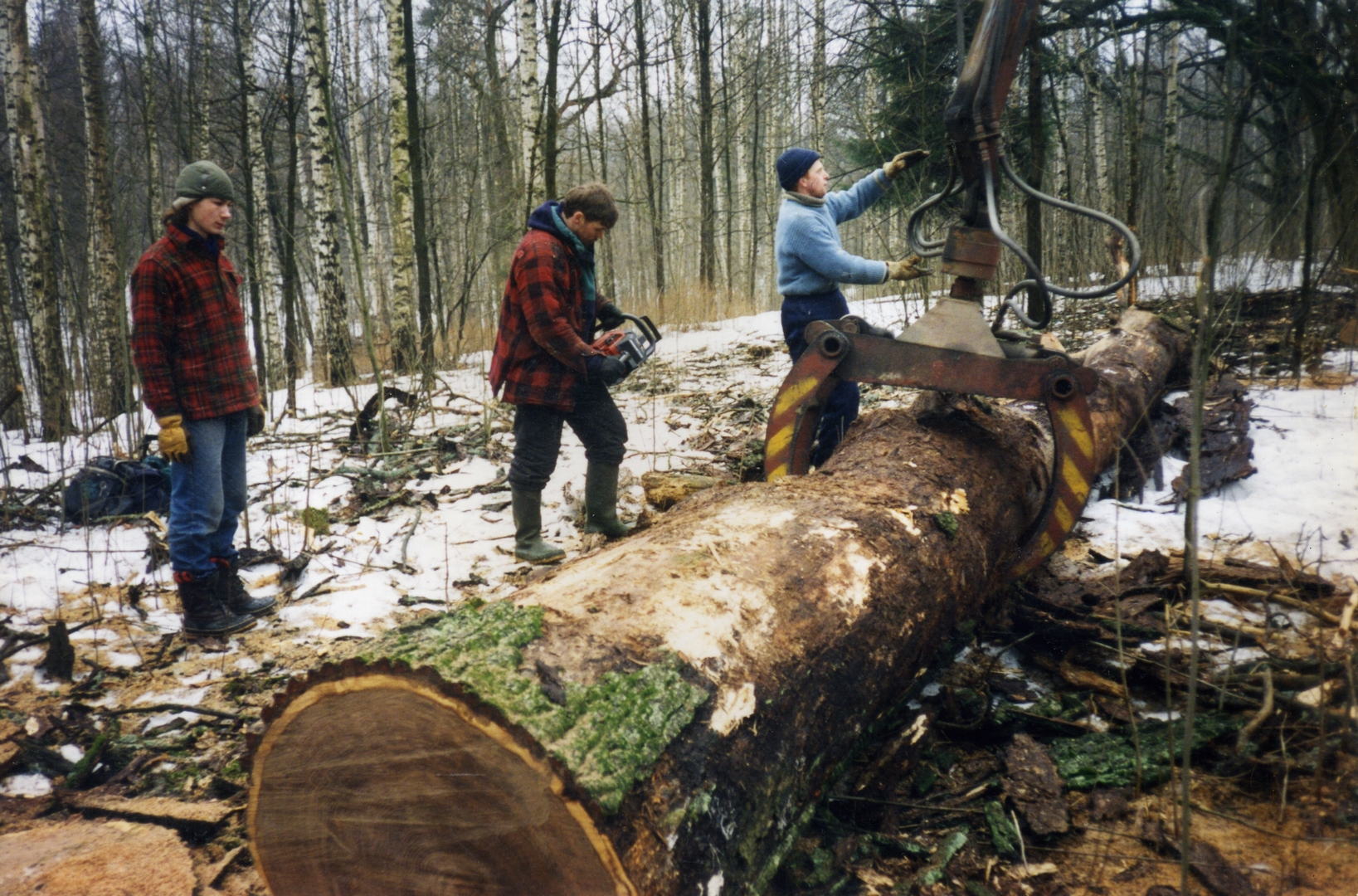
More thick oaks for the wide parts of the frames

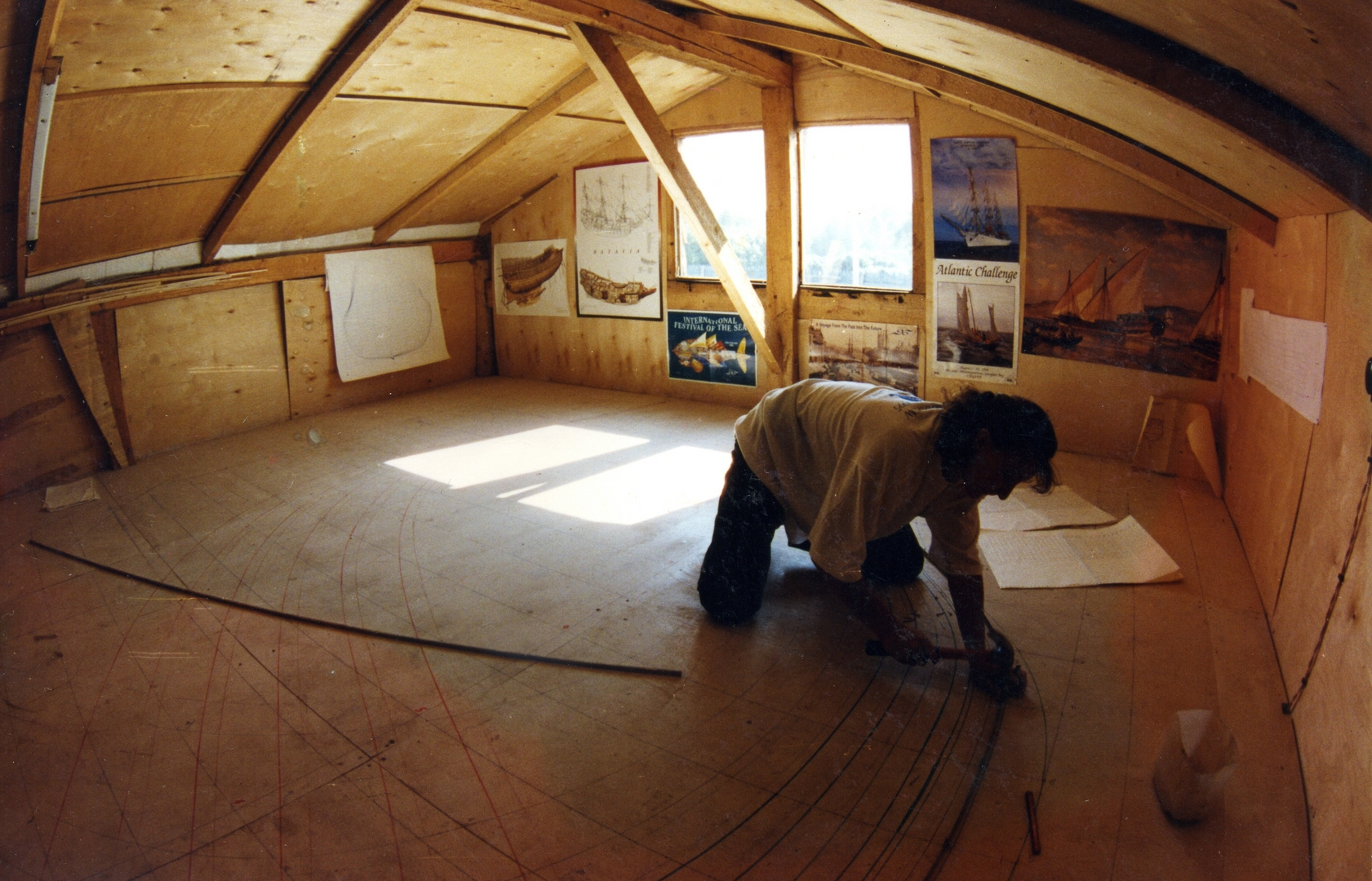
The 'frames floor' in the attic, with all drawings in full size

The keel was laid on November 4, 1994. The oak for the beams was taken from the forests of Saint Petersburg and the Leningrad oblast.

=== 1995 ===
On April 8, 1995, the first of 44 beams was erected, with more soon to follow....

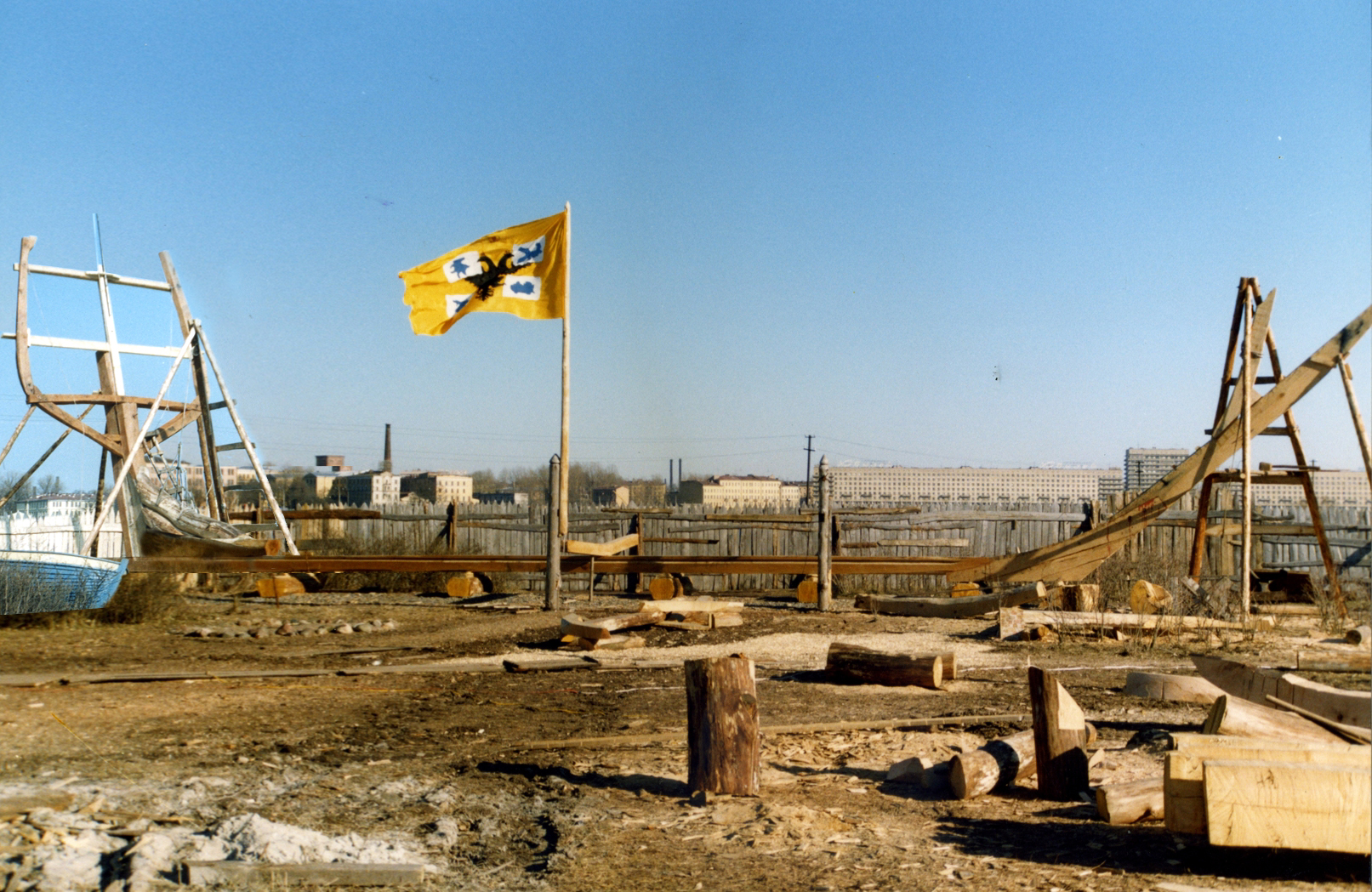
March 1995, keel and sterns are standing.

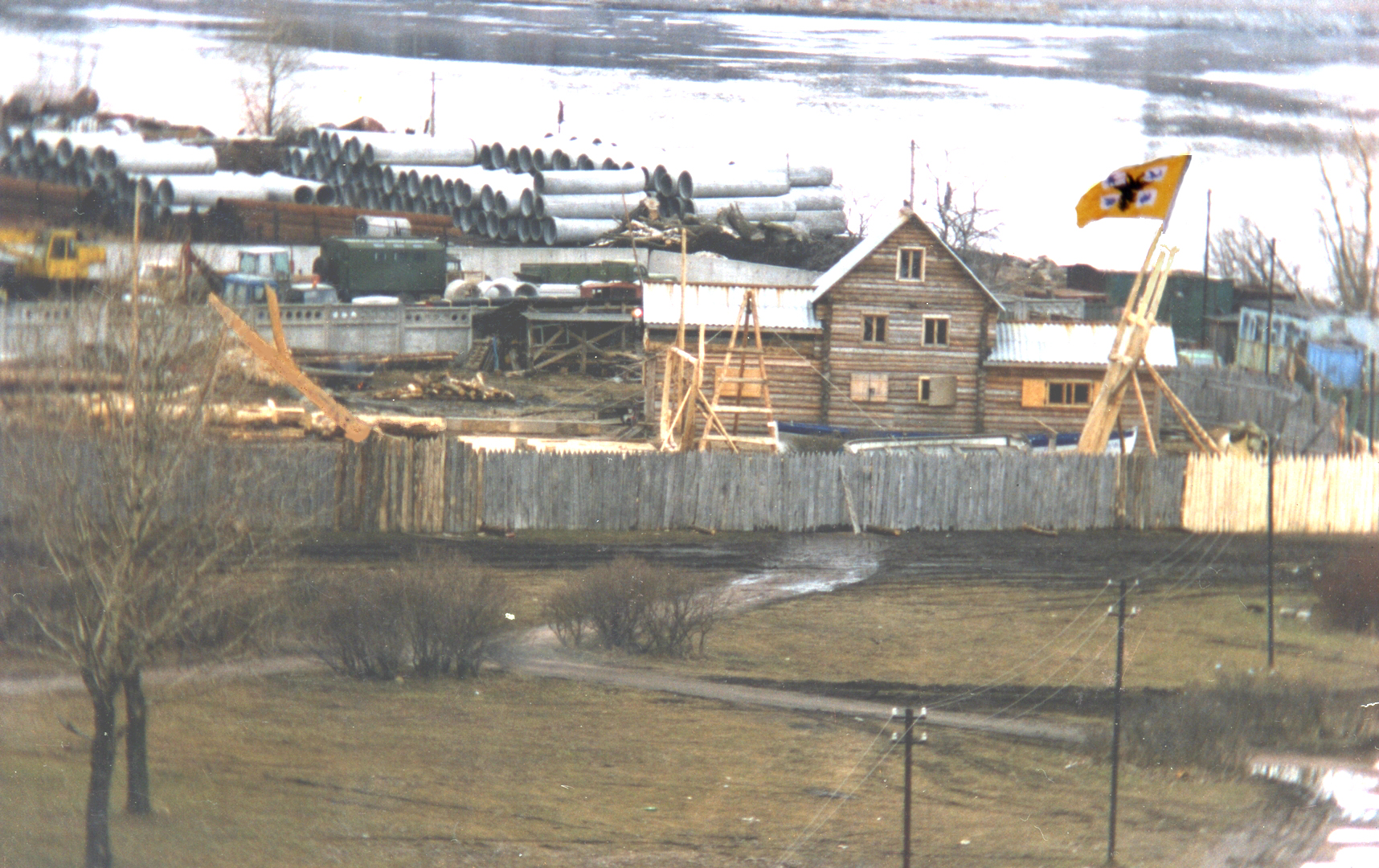
April 8, 1995, the first frame ('major frame')

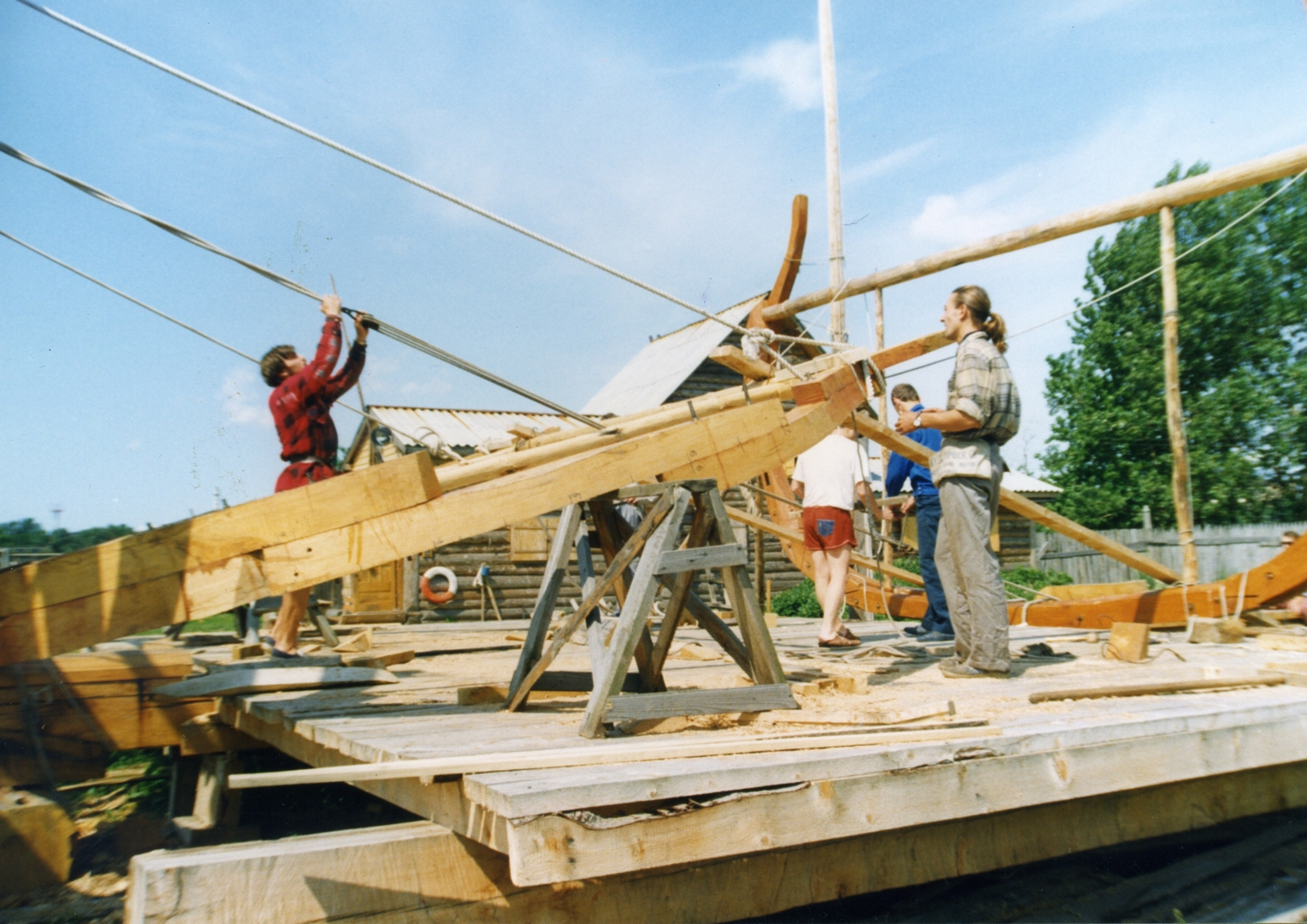
Setting up frame 3 on April 15th, the major frame is also there.

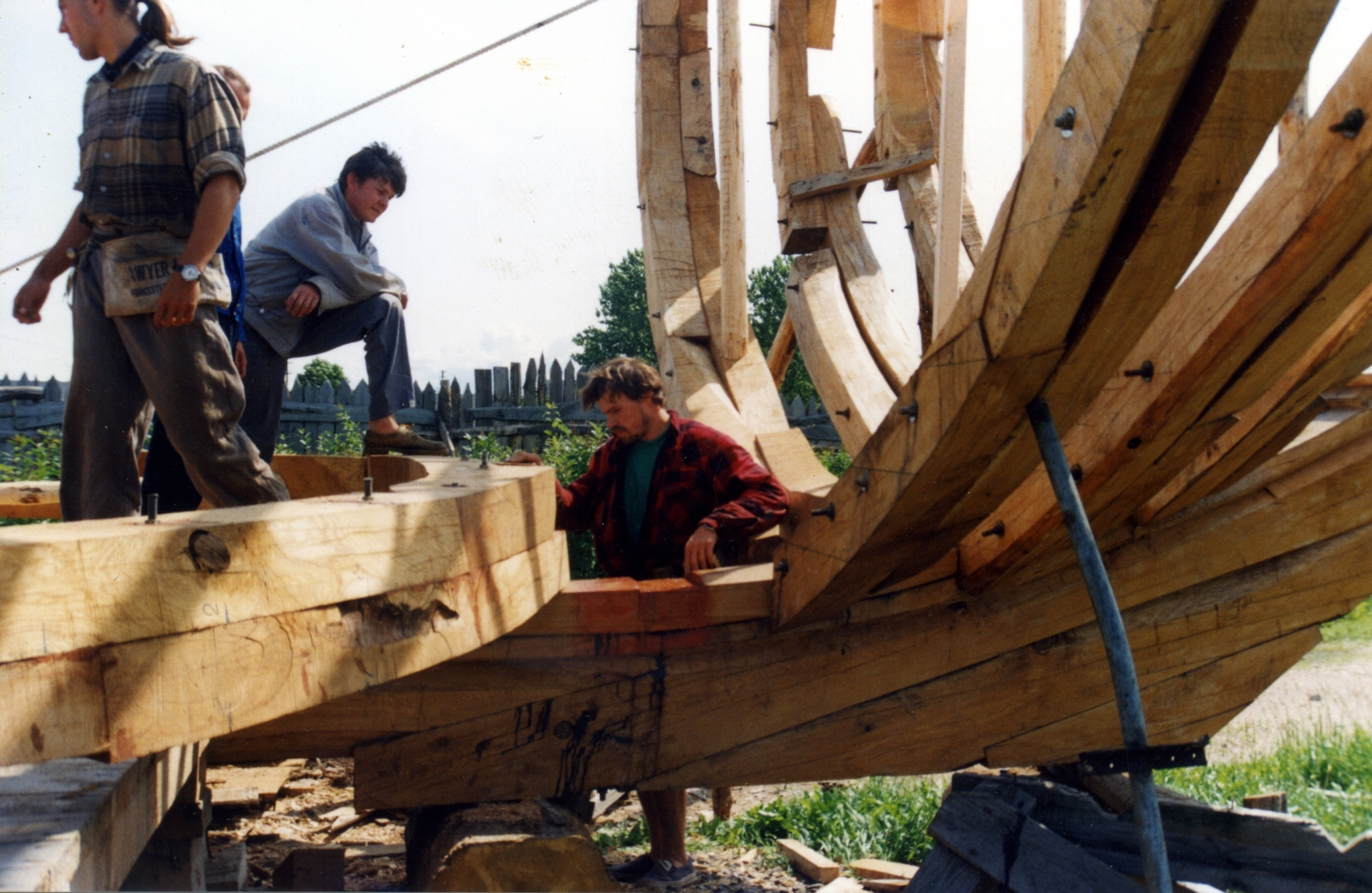
On May 30, frame 6 was put on the keel

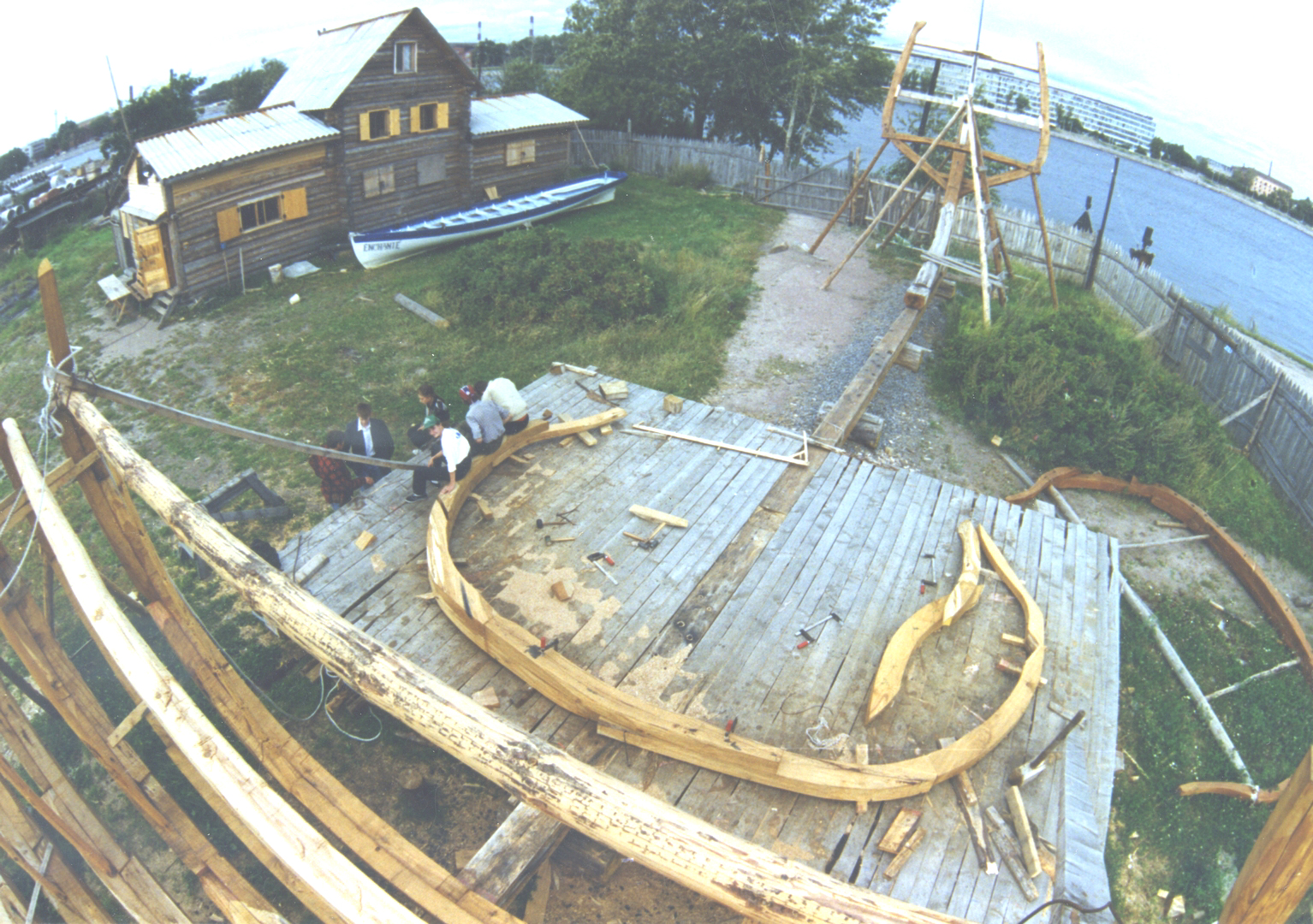
almost half of the 44 were set on July 25th.

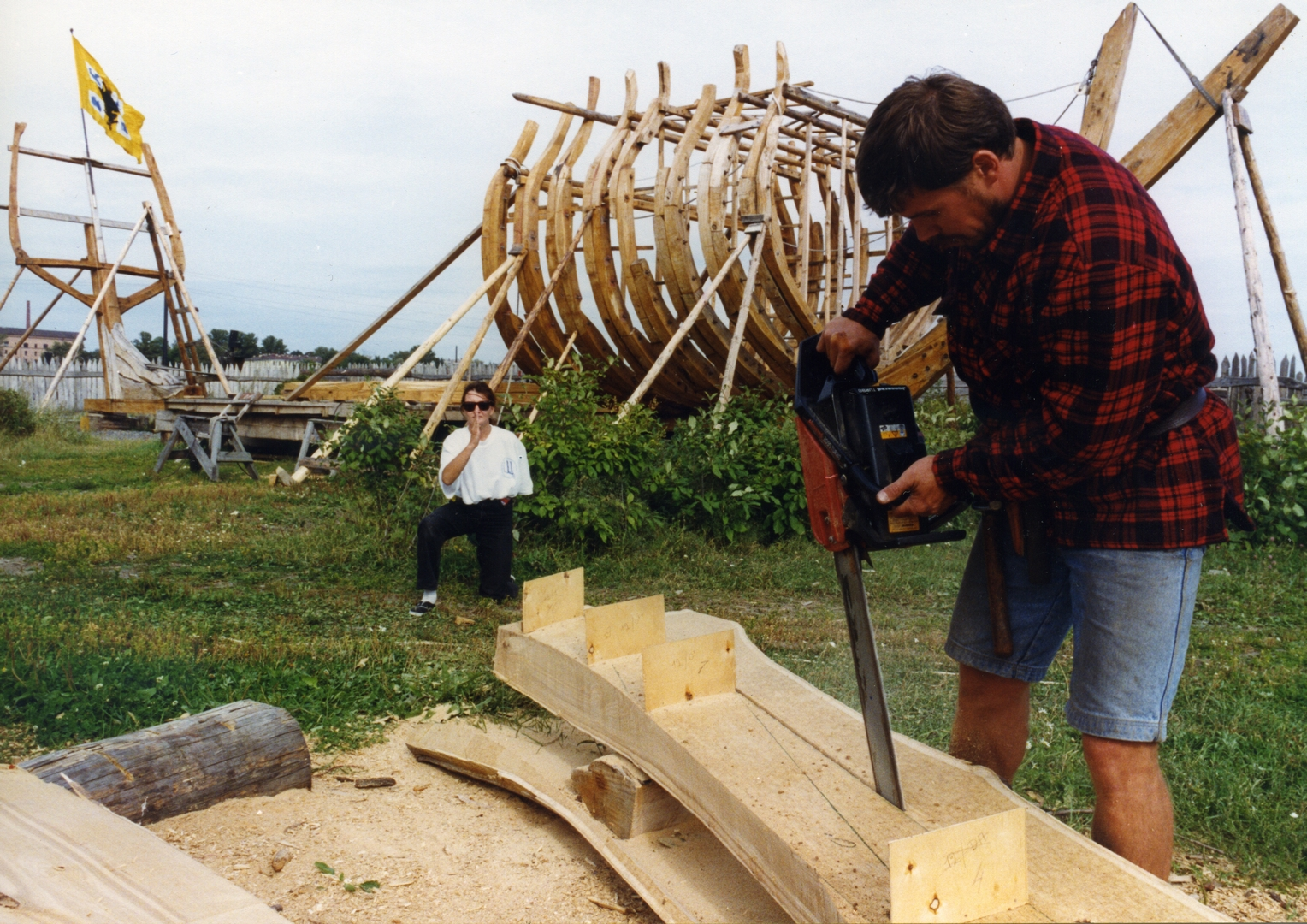
Old craft: 'viewing' when sawing a frame-section

=== 1996 ===
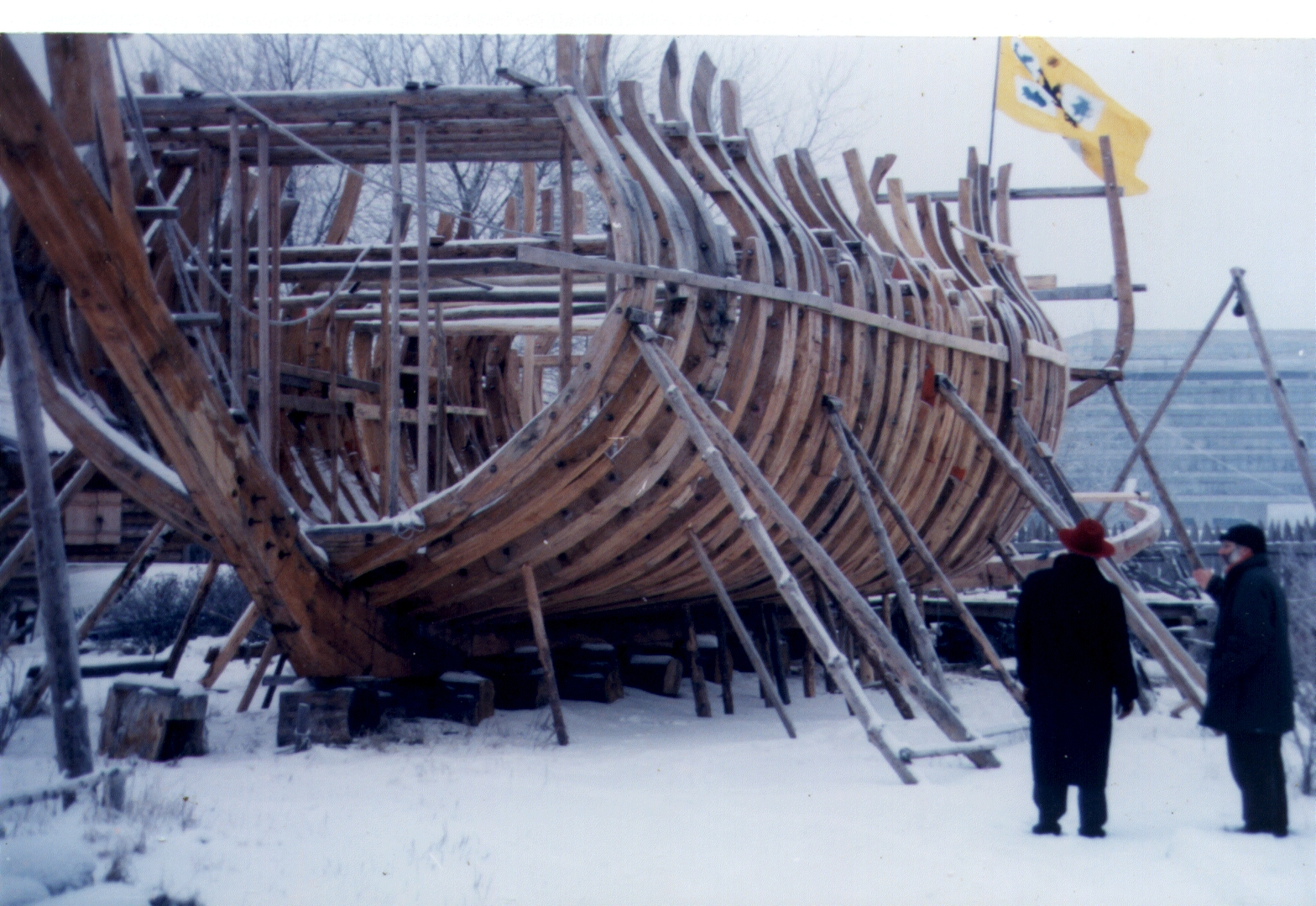
22 dec. 1995, (it's-25)

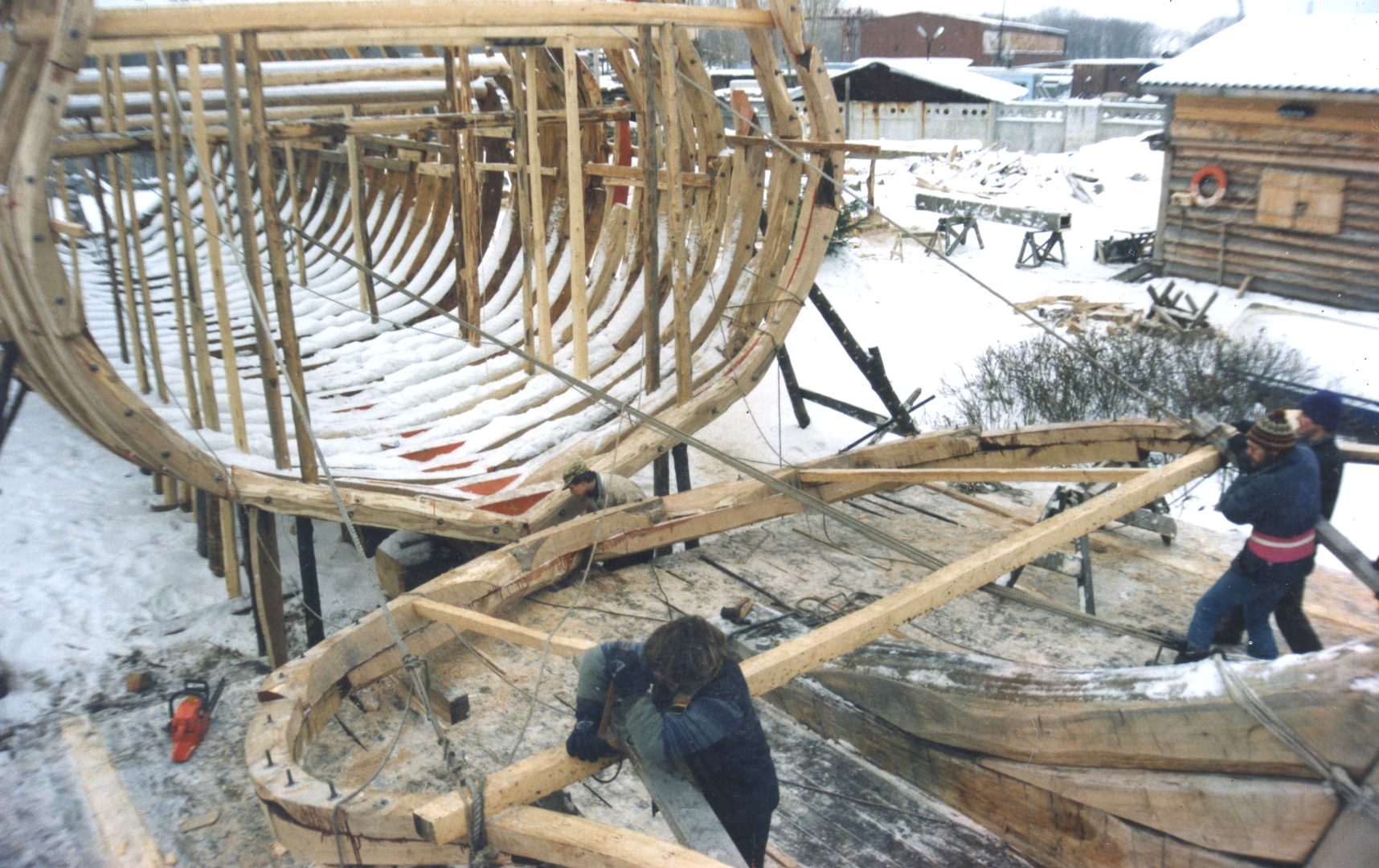
February 5, 1996, still very cold! But we're almost there.

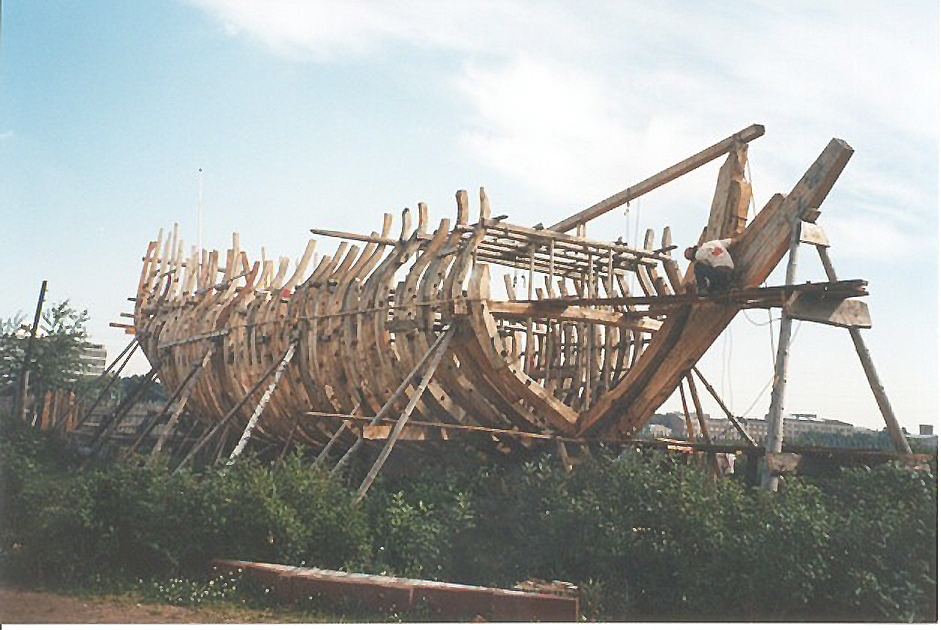
19 Sept 1996, the last one? looks like it.

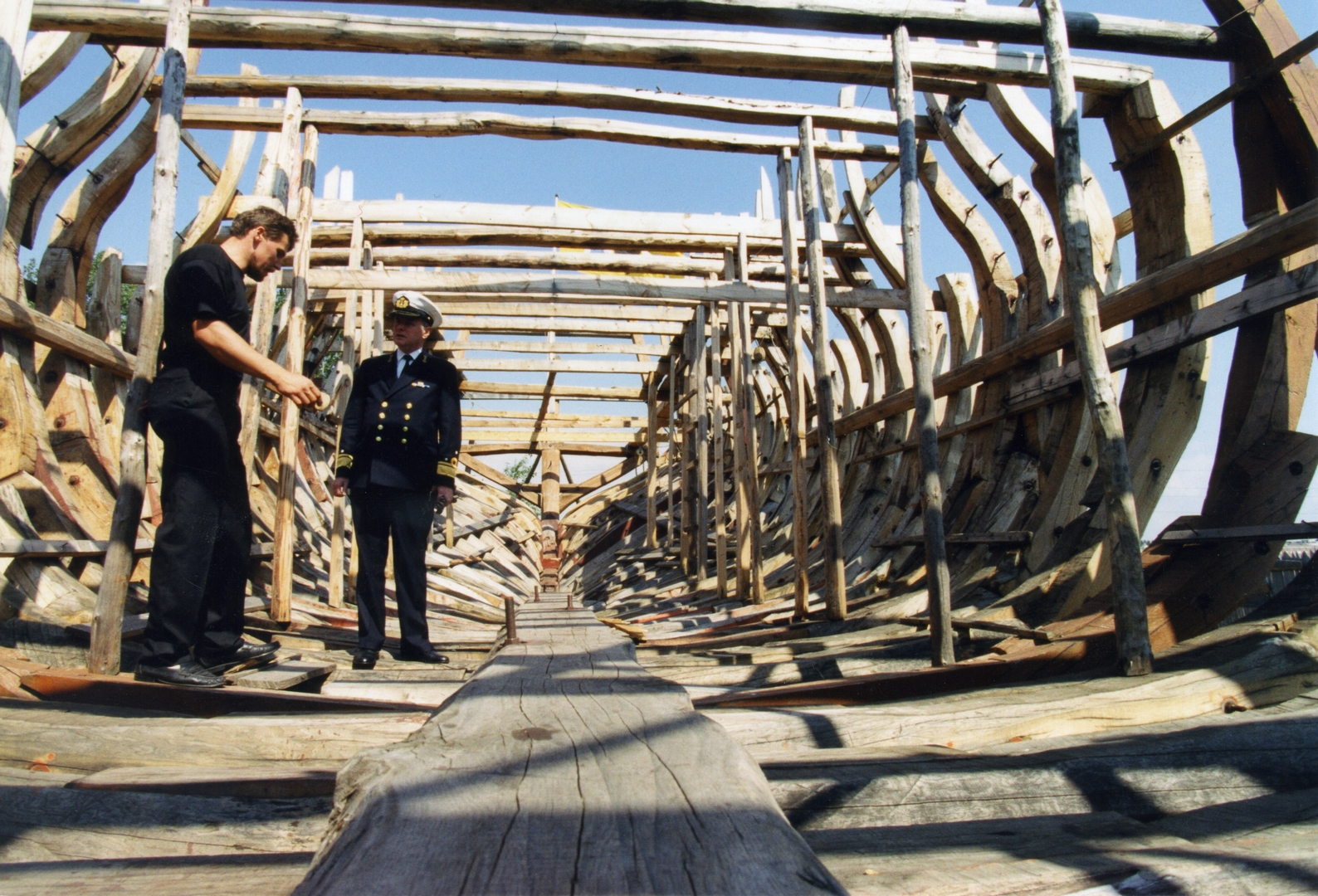
Visit of the Dutch General C.v. Duivendijk in the sun of September 1996.

==== Skin ====
In that autumn and winter of 1996, larch trees were again removed from the forest over 15 meters in length, to cut skin and decking boards 8 cm thick and 20 cm wide.

=== 1997 ===
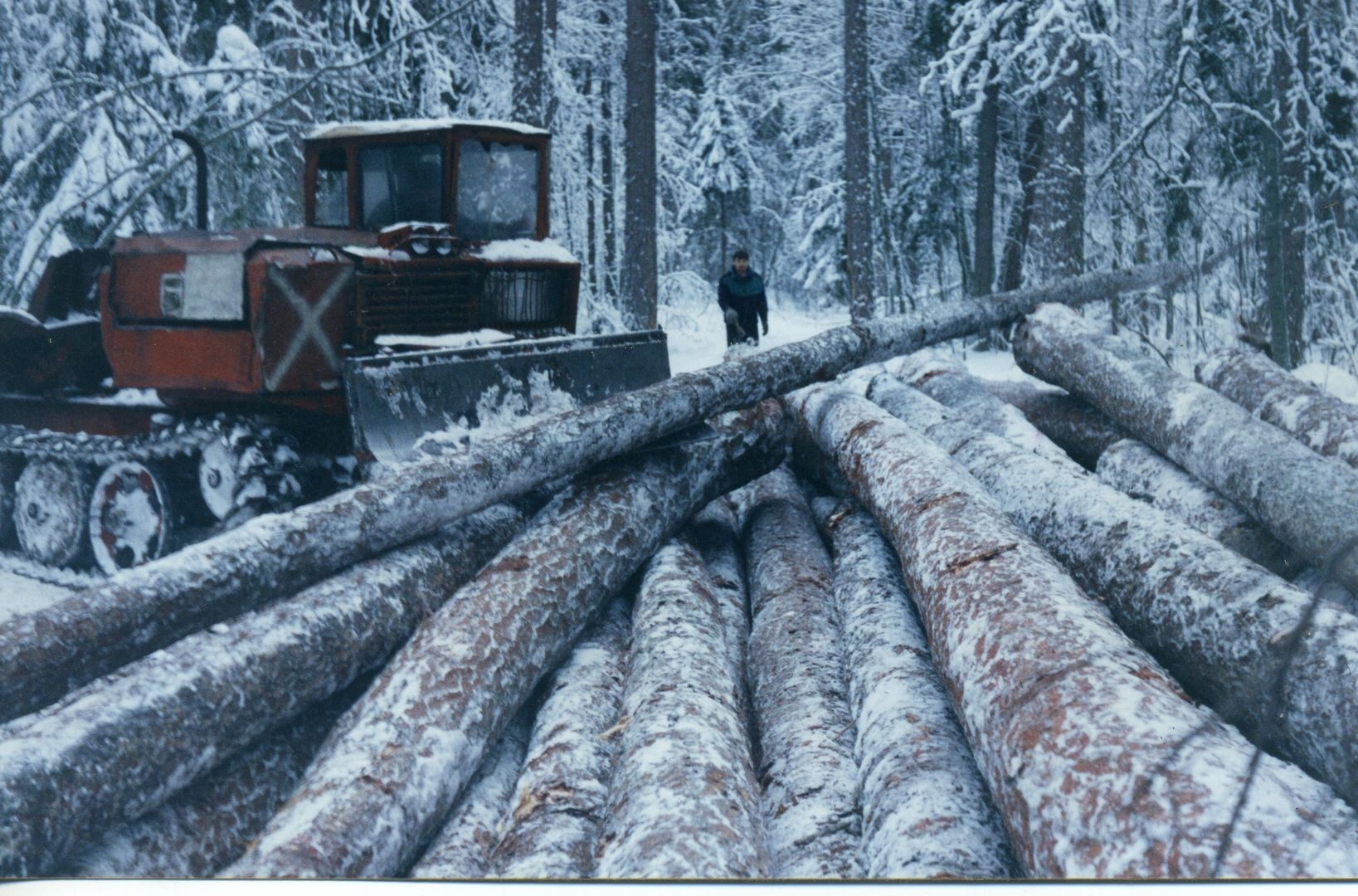
Dec1996:more larch trunks collected in the snow

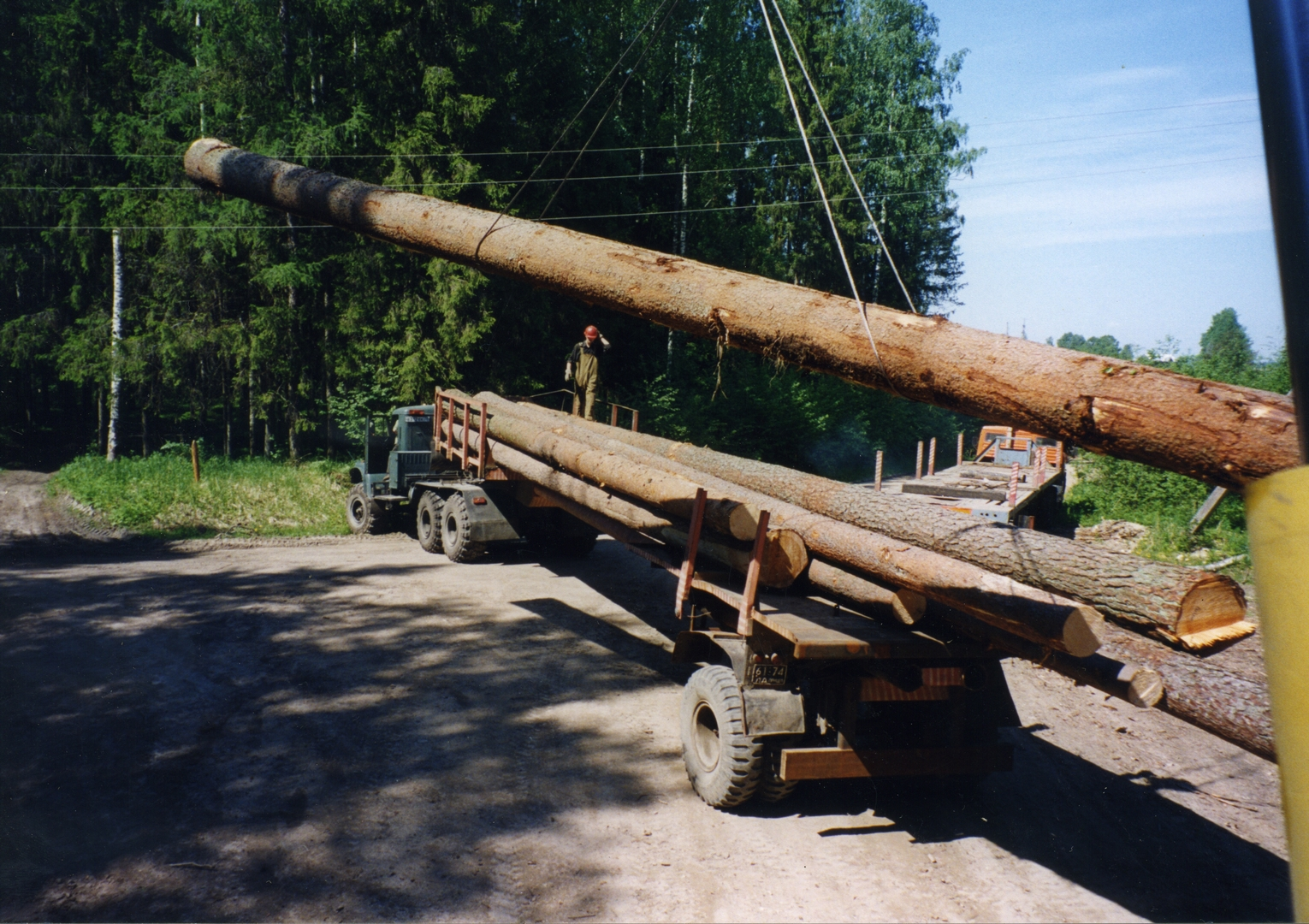
and transported. And now find a sawmill....

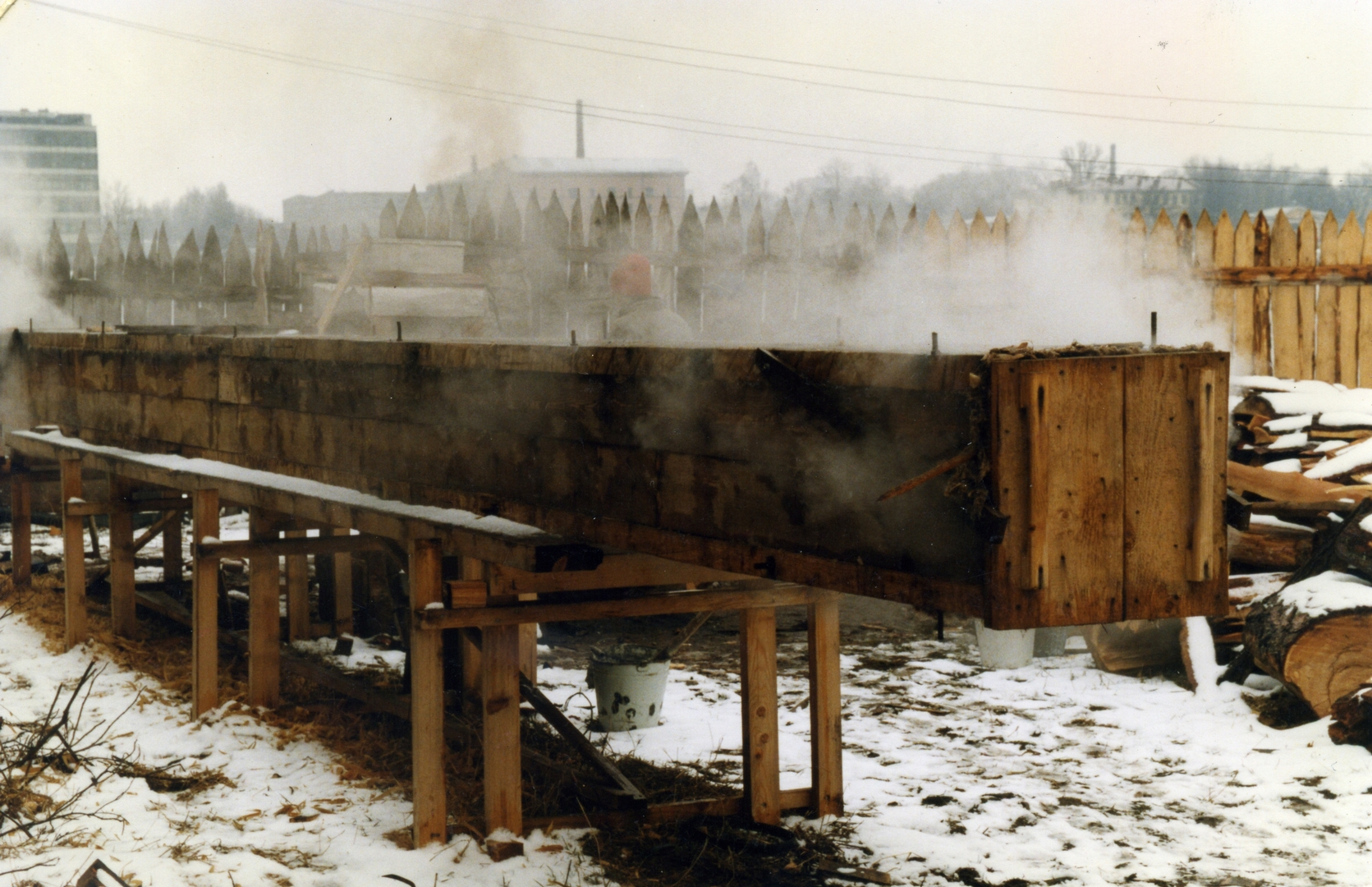
Steamed..... at least 3 hours.

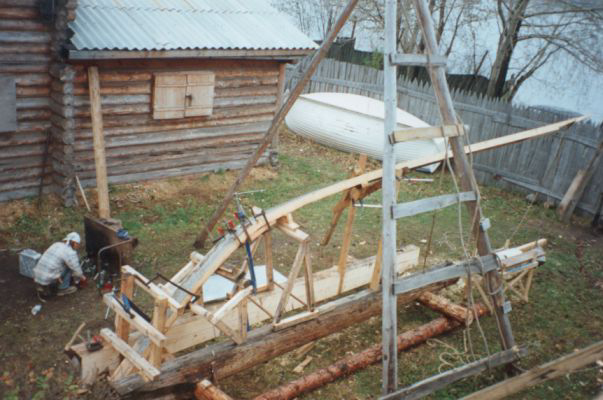
and then bent in the old-fashioned way...

A 12-metre-long, 18th-century steam box was rebuilt to allow for the bending and shaping of the skin and decking planks.
According to Martous, they have even recreated the fuel used to fuel the steam box - the sawdust and wood shavings left over from their carpentry.

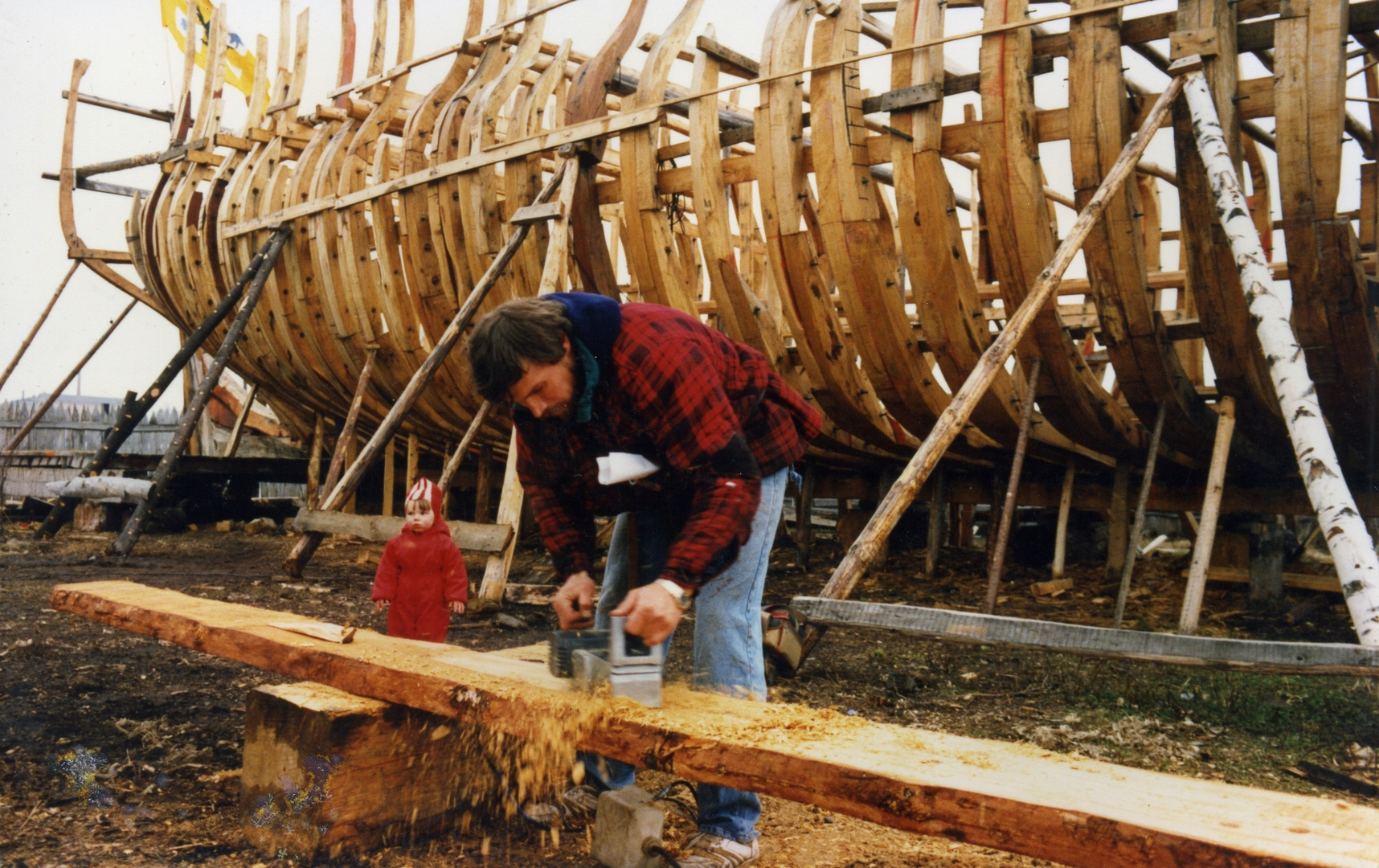
planing deck beams with expert supervision....

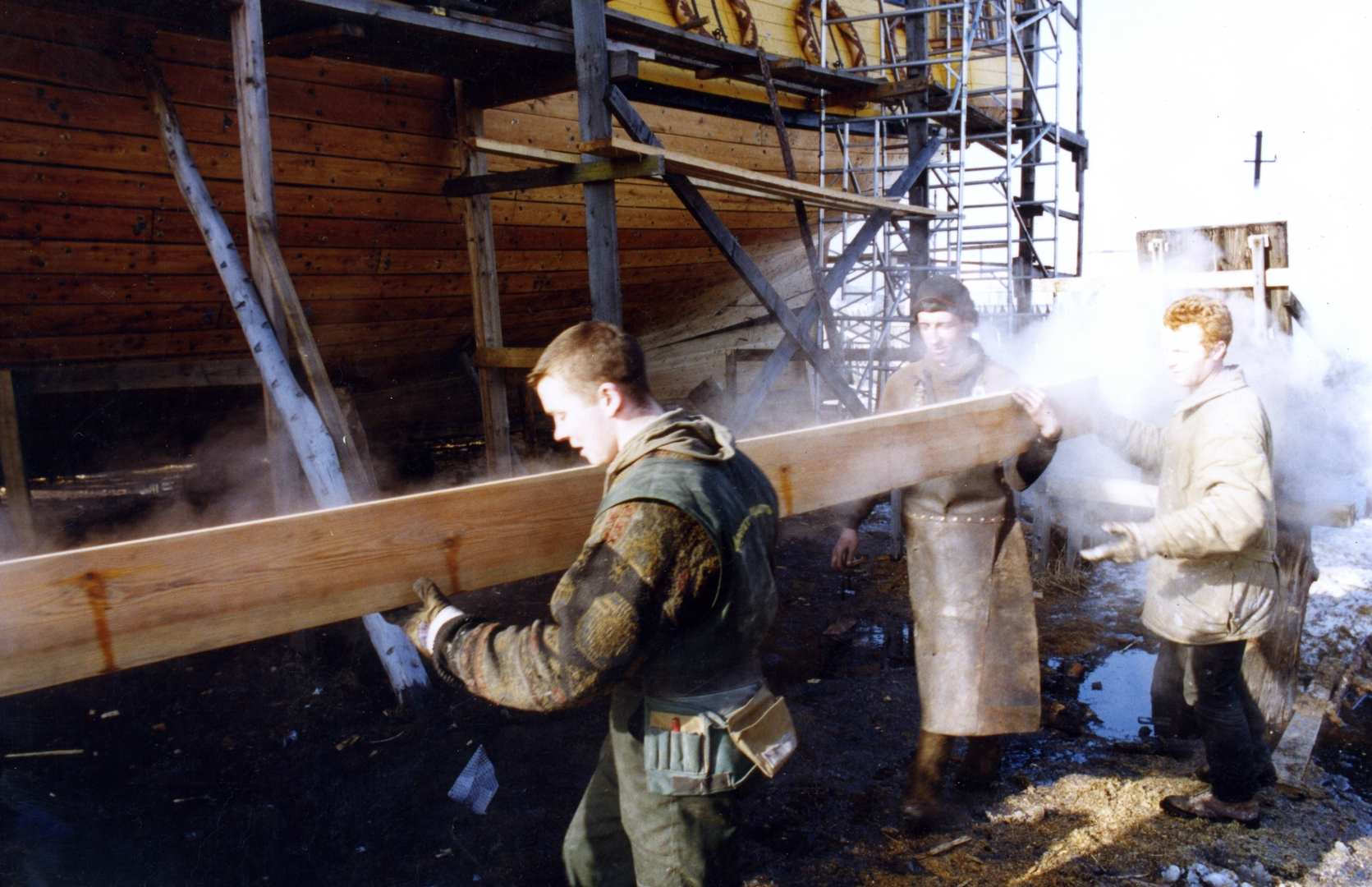
steamed bottom skin plank....

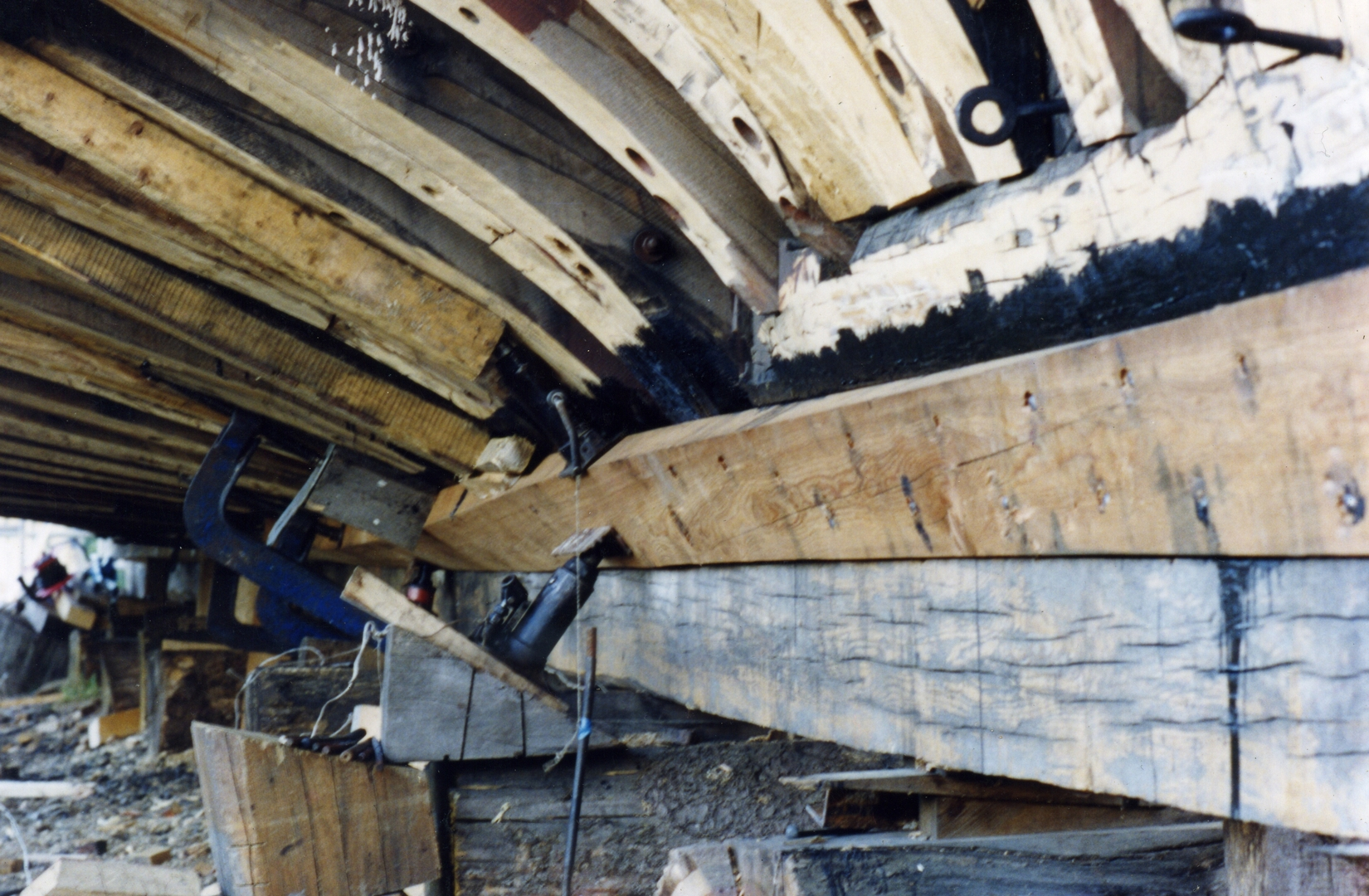
which has a 'nice' twist.
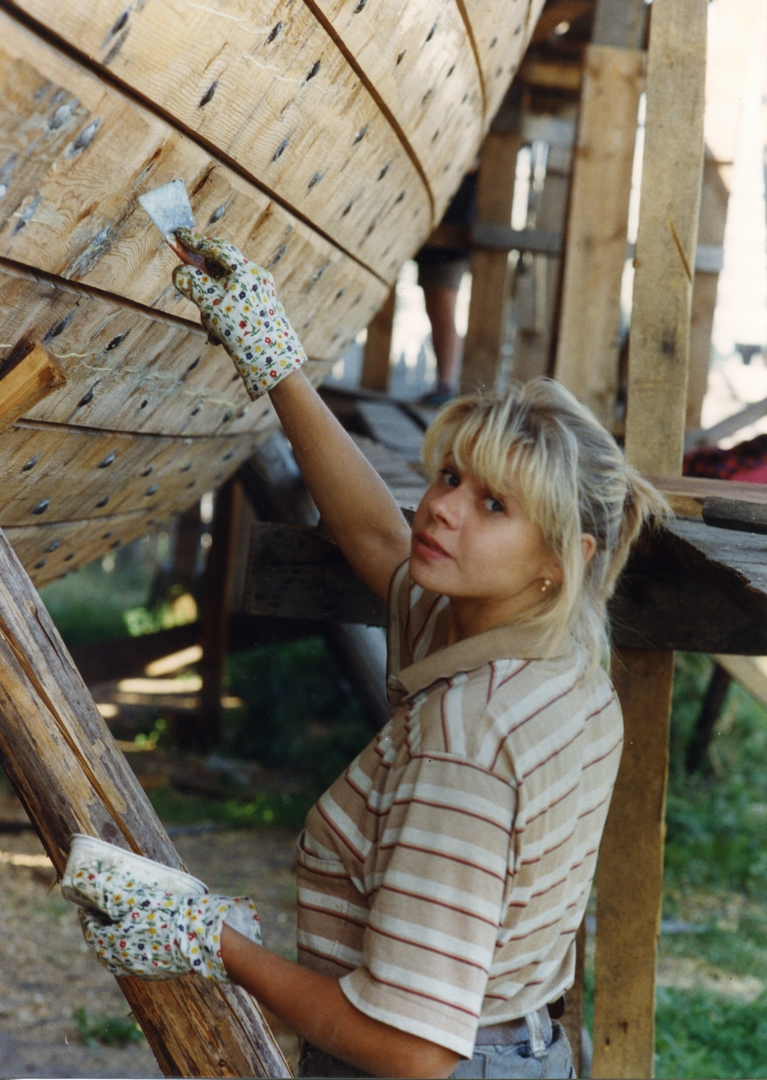
The nail holes closed

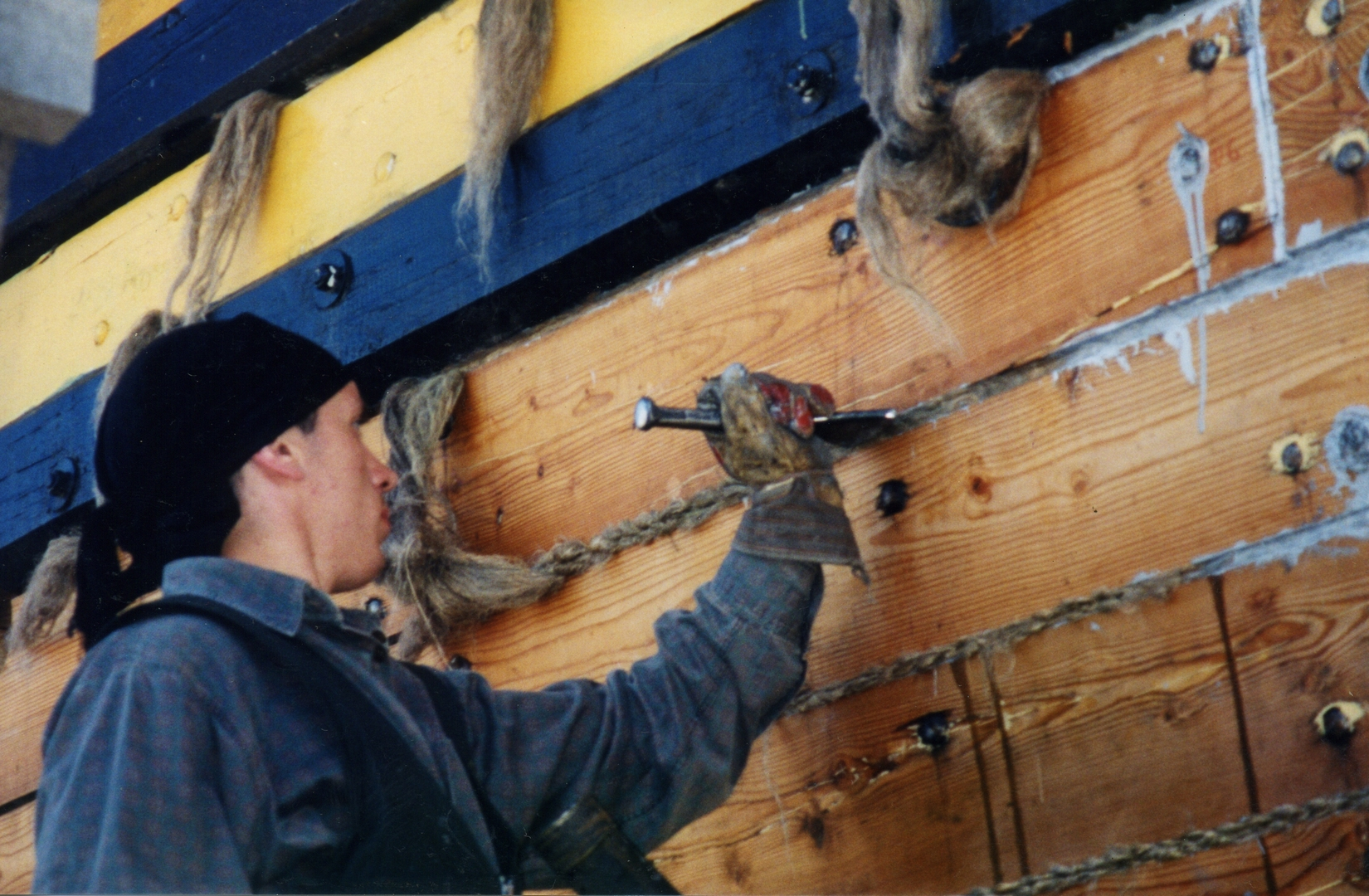
Caulking with caulking hammer, iron and hemp

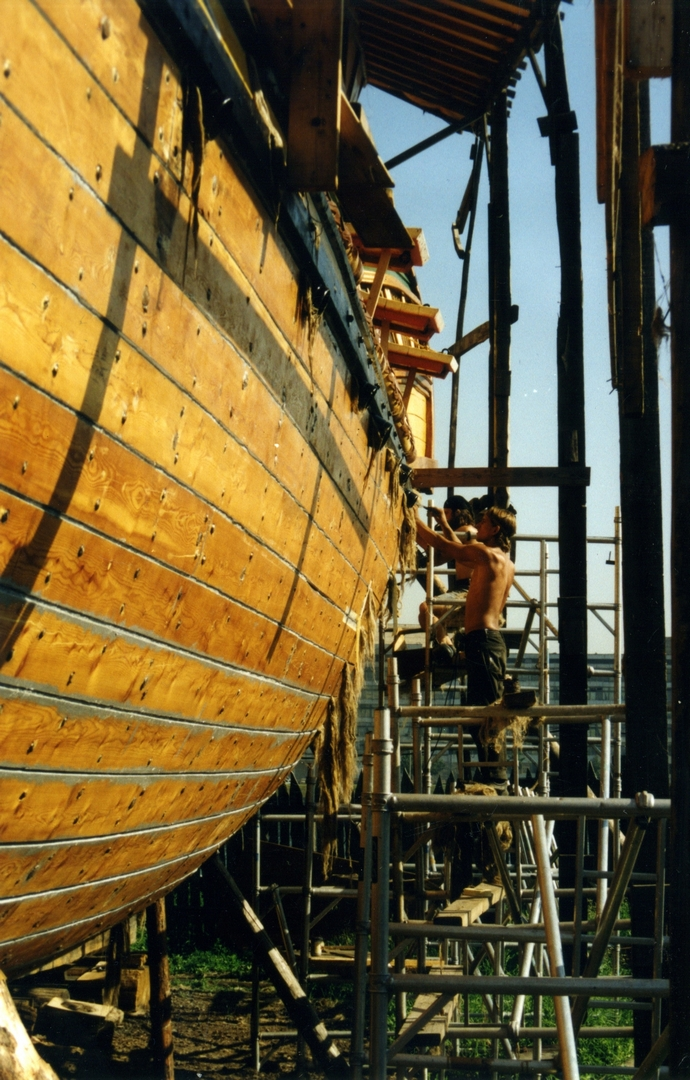
It was 'making meters', more than 1000 meters for the entire ship.

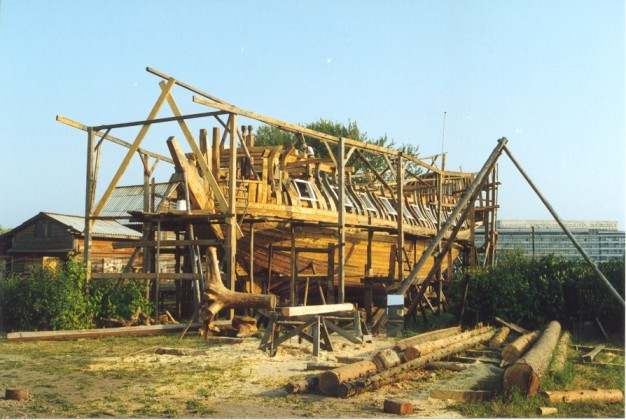
The 'Bulwark' also had to be built.

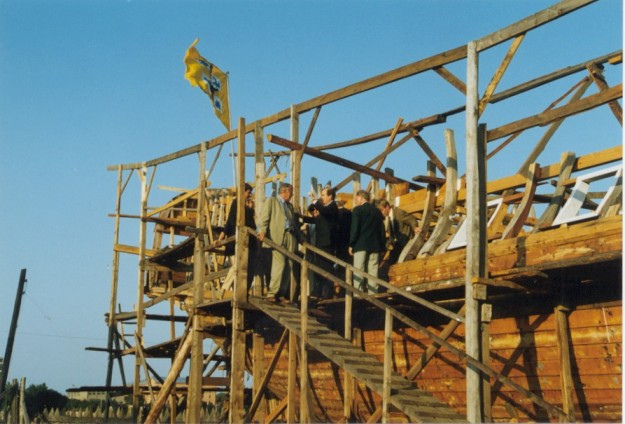
Visit of the Dutch minister v. Mierlo.
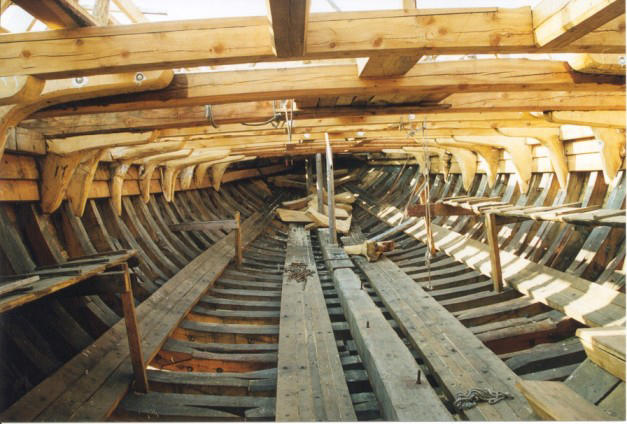
lower hold with lower deckbeams.

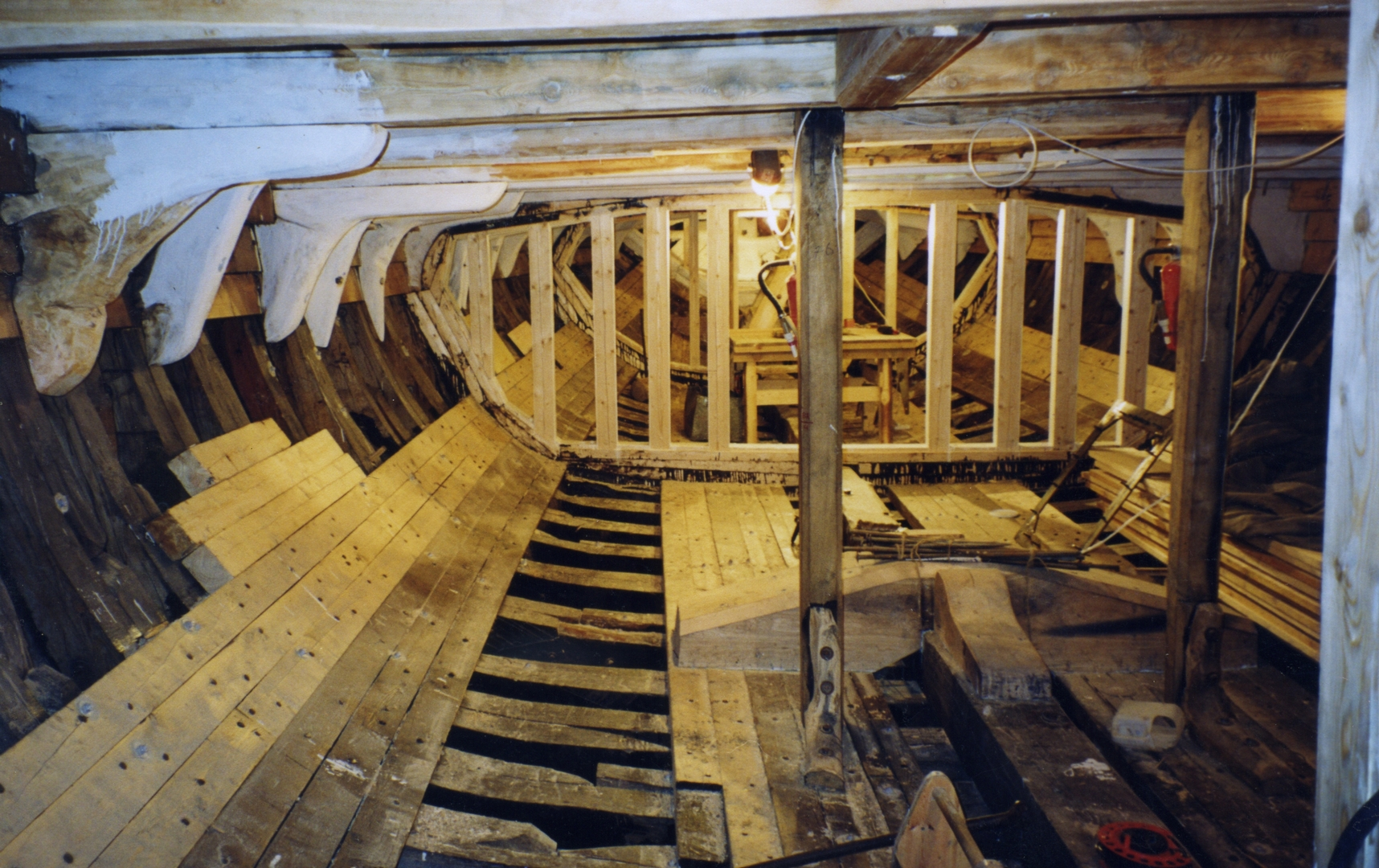
a panel in it to separate the machine room

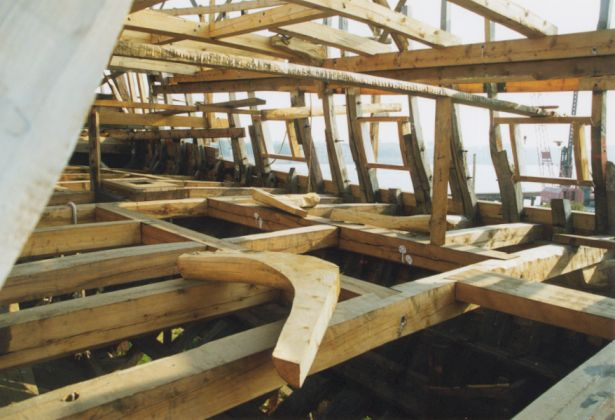
The jigsaw puzzle with holes for the shutters

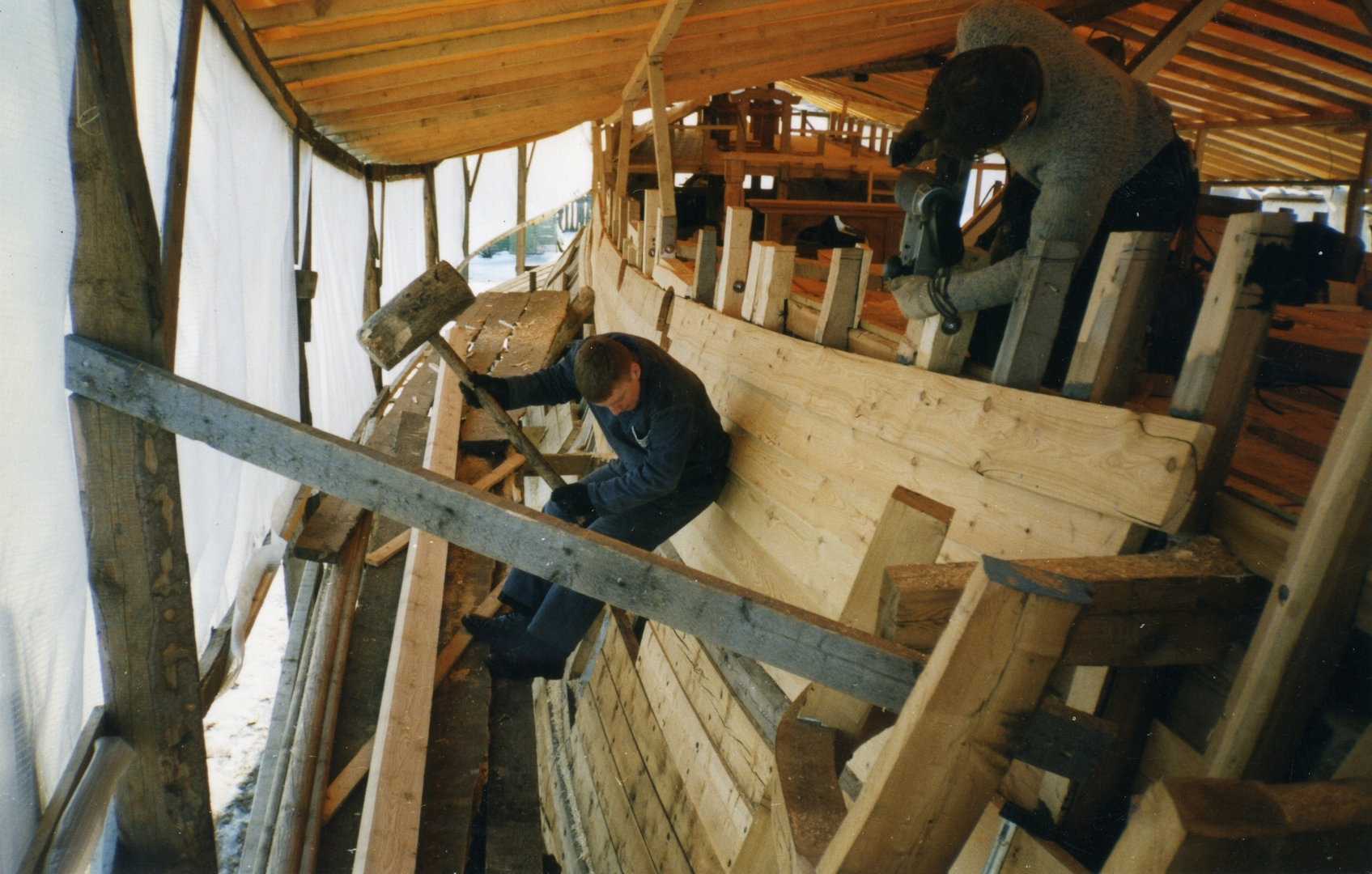
Fix the top skin planks for the bulwark as well...

and also skin planks:

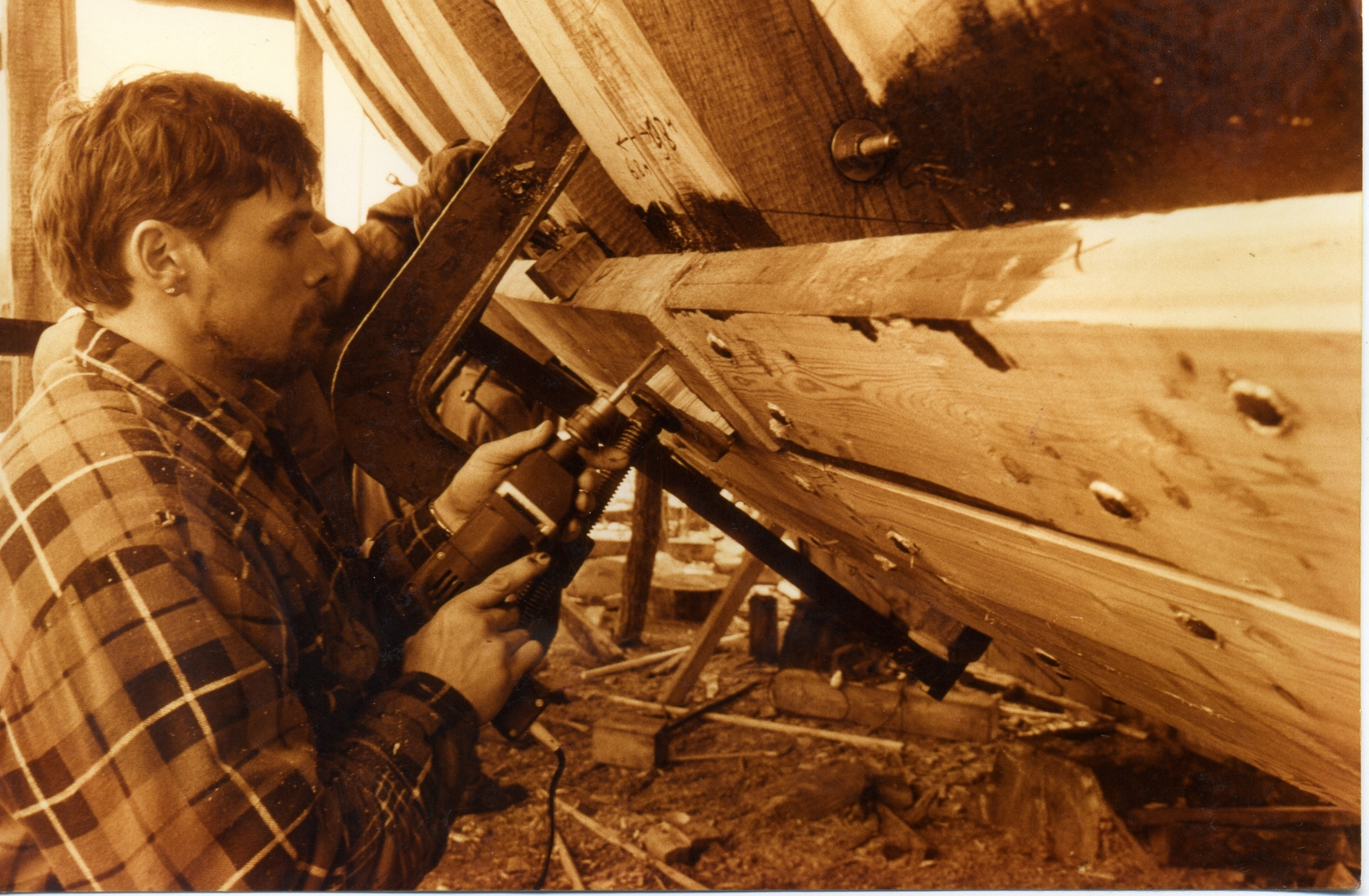
Put everything in place with pitch and glue clamps.

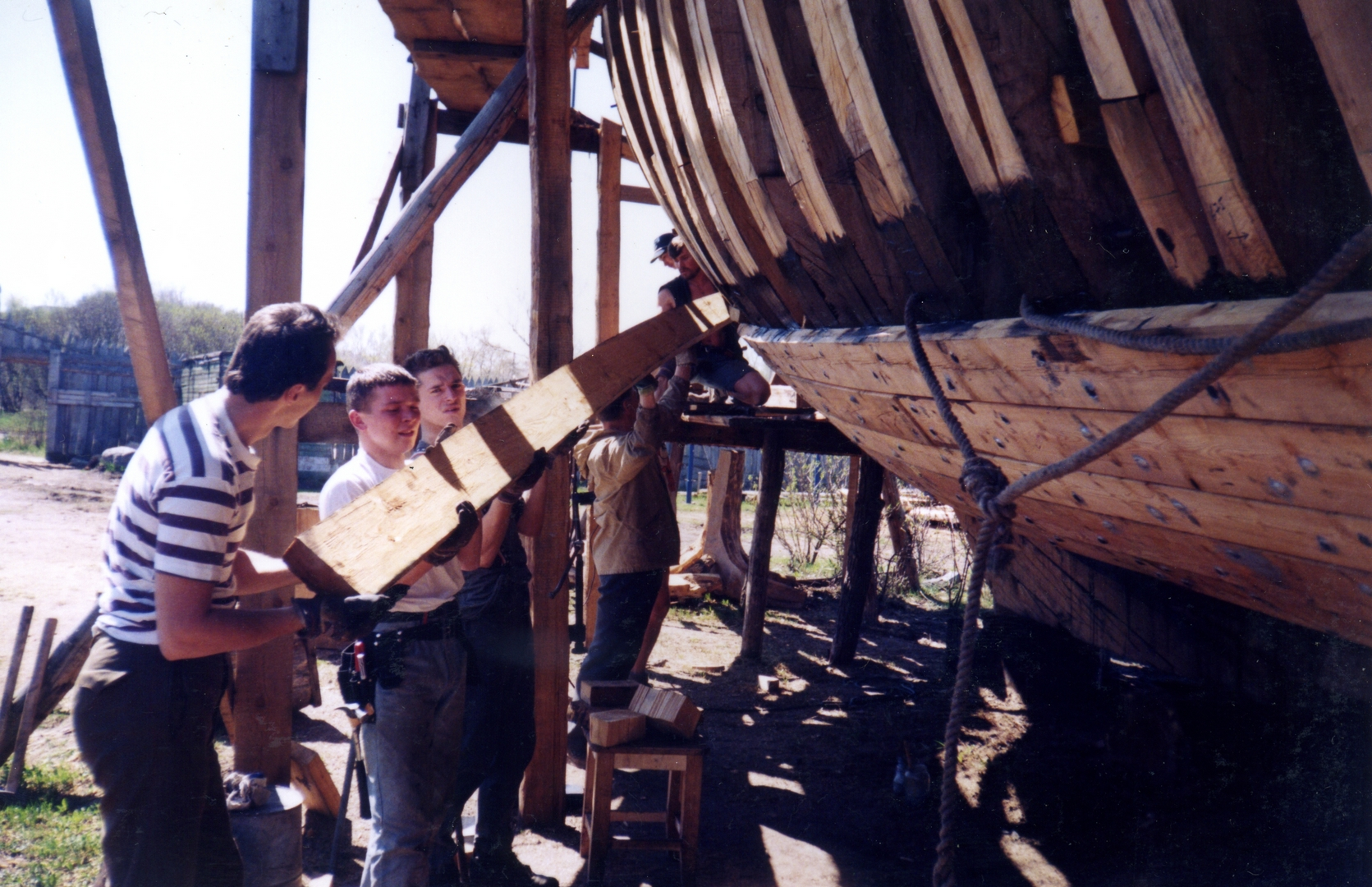
Fit a skin plank in consultation and cooperation

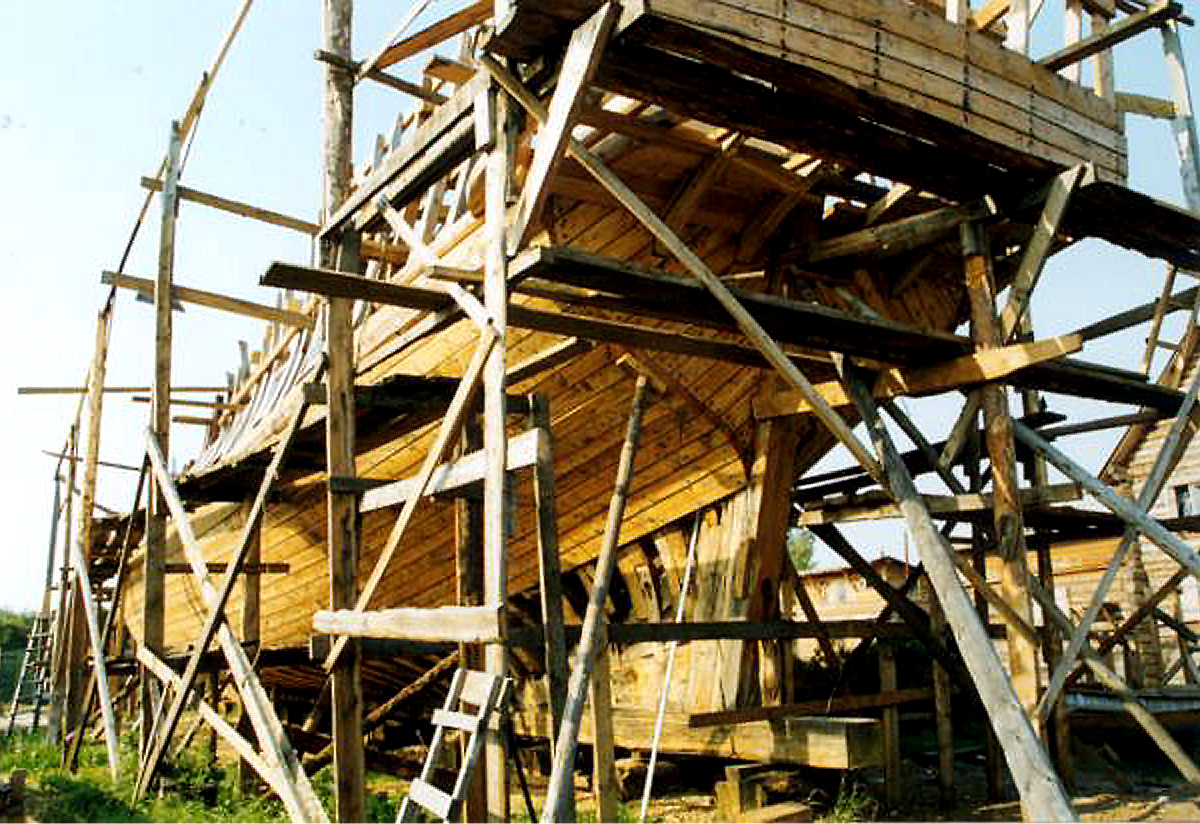
also the back, where scaffolding is needed.

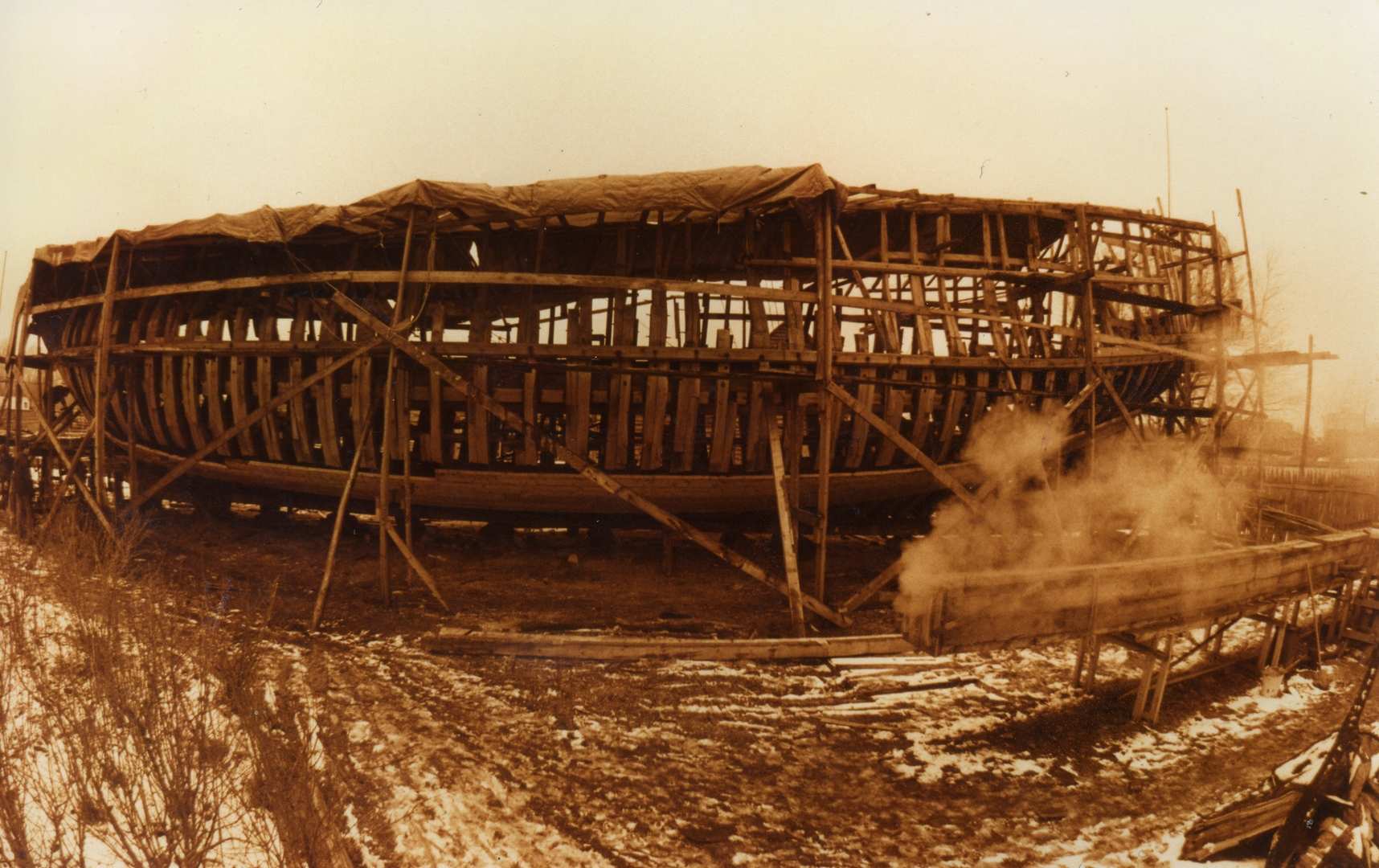
Not ready yet, but wintering anyway....

but soon also for the two upper decks, made of pine, fore and aft

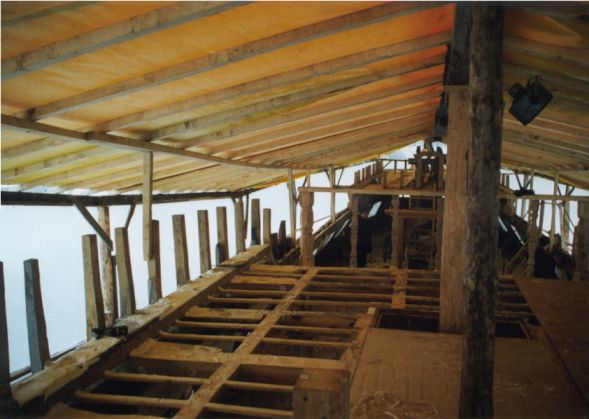
the top deck with the campaign deck in the back

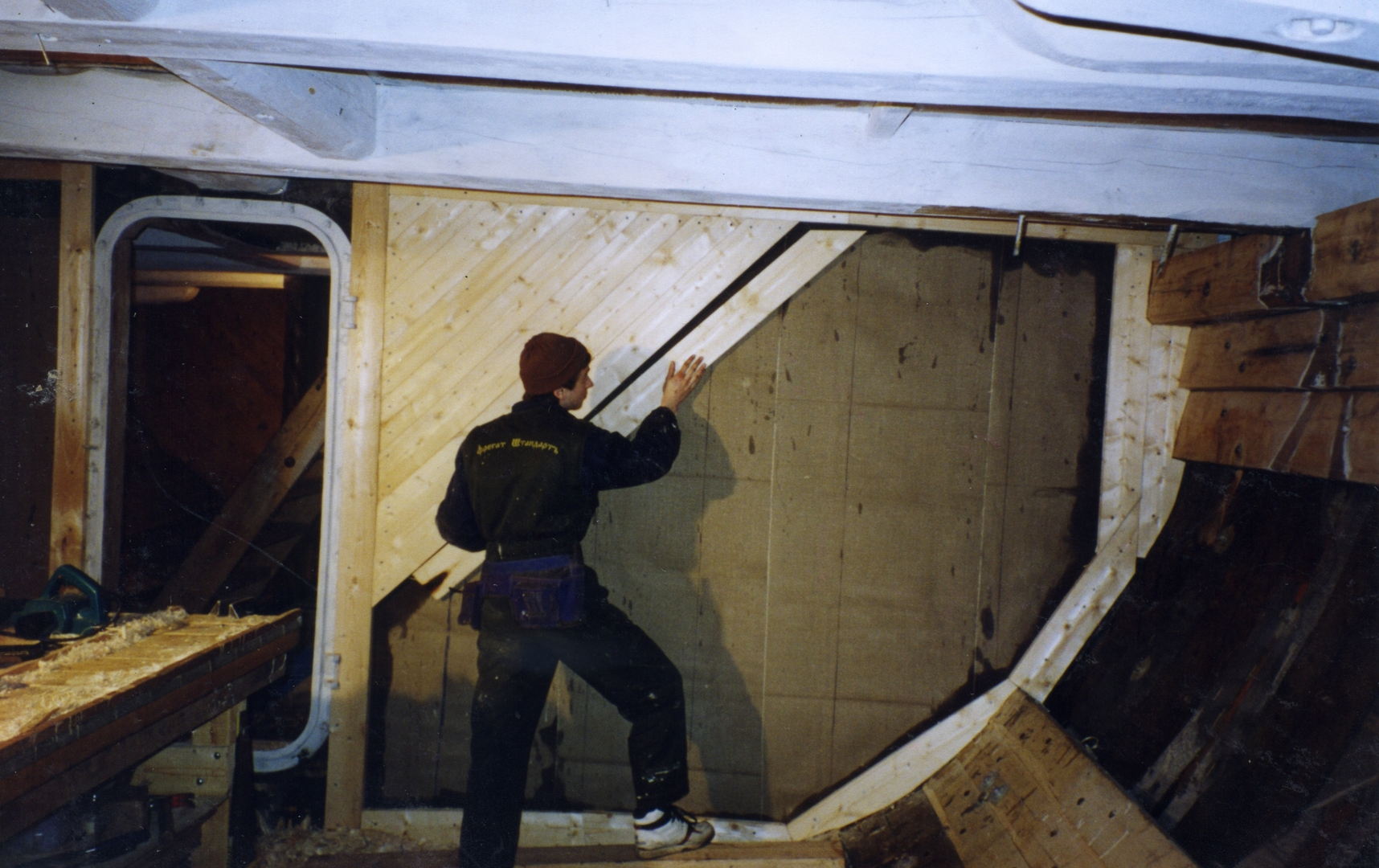
compartments below deck

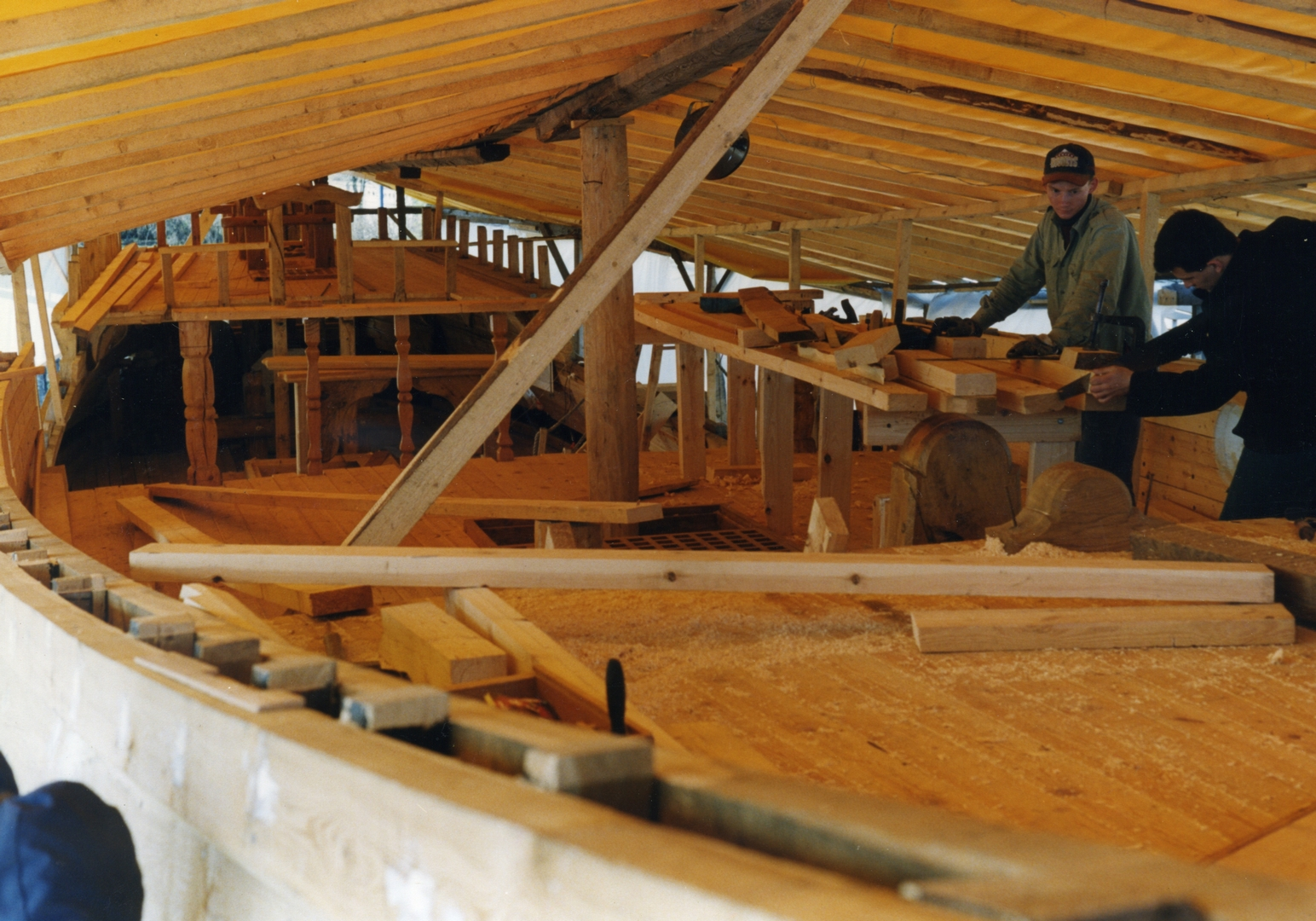
front and aft decks are "closed"

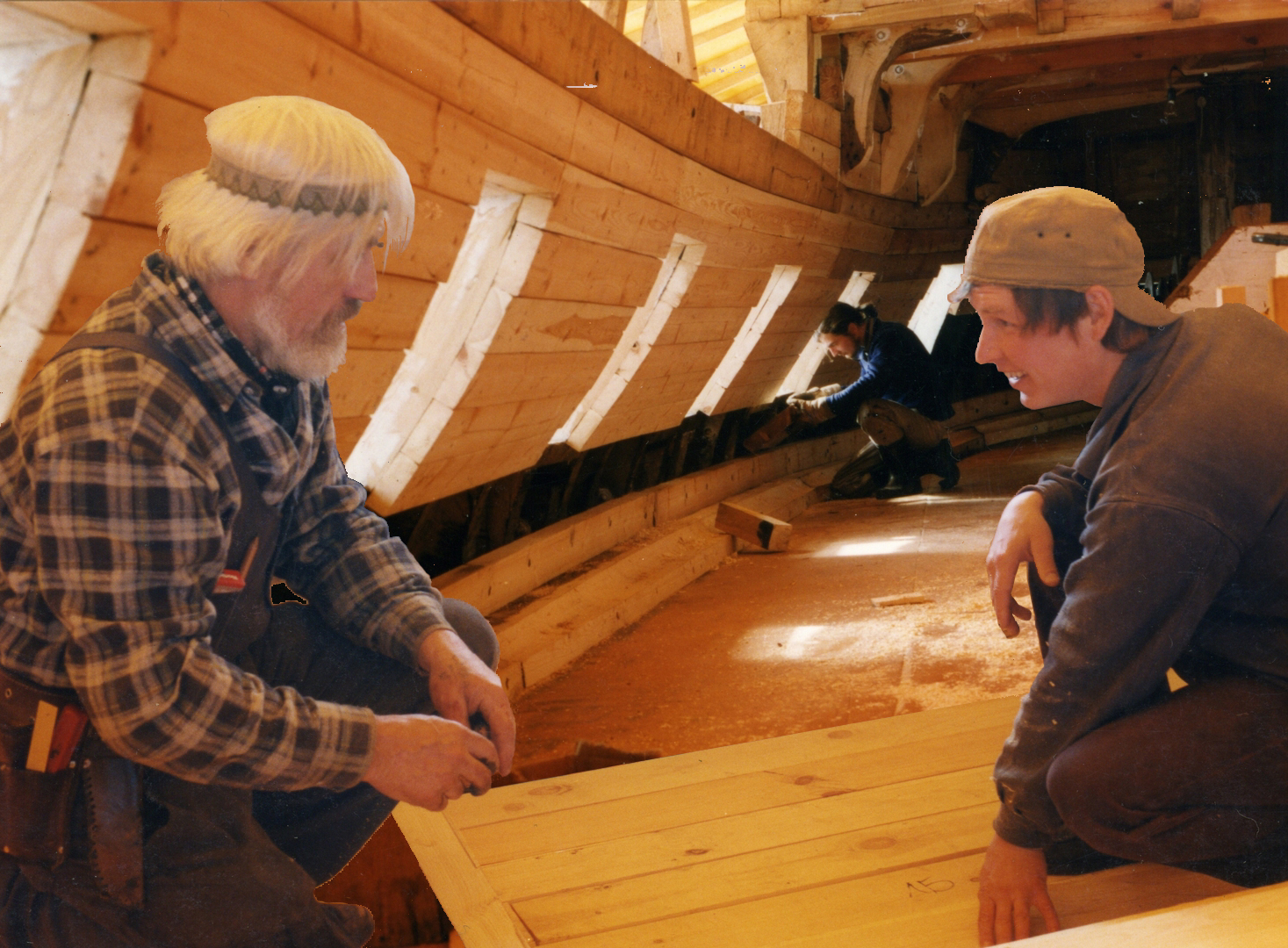
"constructors - consultation"

=== 1998 ===
But because it was necessary to baptize, a temporary stern was made (with the name misspelled, as turned out later!),
and also other large pieces: the figurehead and the guardian dwarf "Grumpy".

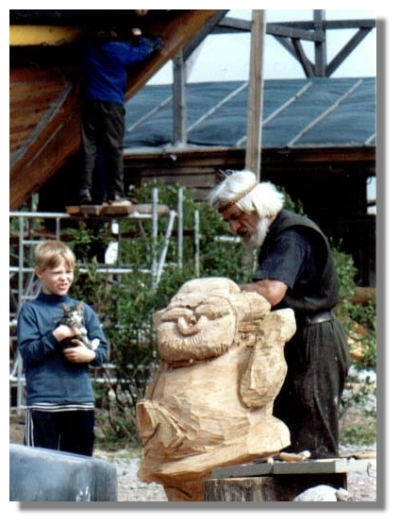
Grumpy, his creator and a supervisor...

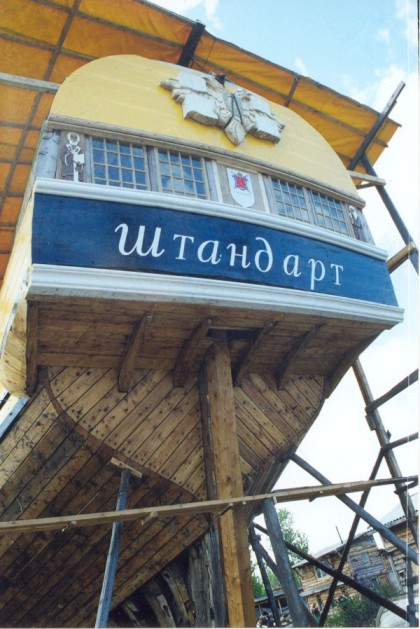
Temporary Transom with spelling error in the name

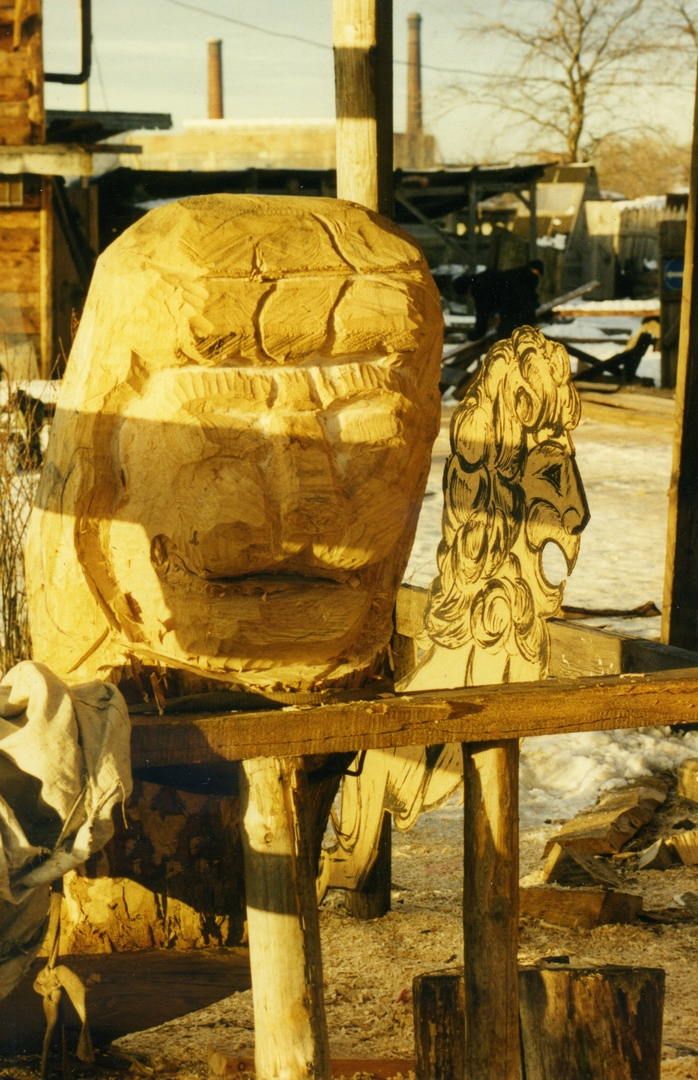
Figurehead half way, with the sketch

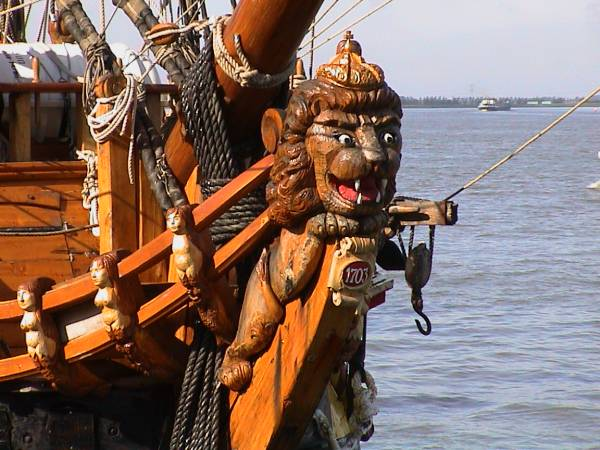
That's how the lion became....

==== Baptism ====
The replica Shtandart was christened on May 30, 1998, by the ship's two patrons, Prince Andrew, the Duke of York and the Governor of Saint Petersburg, Vladimir Ykovlev.

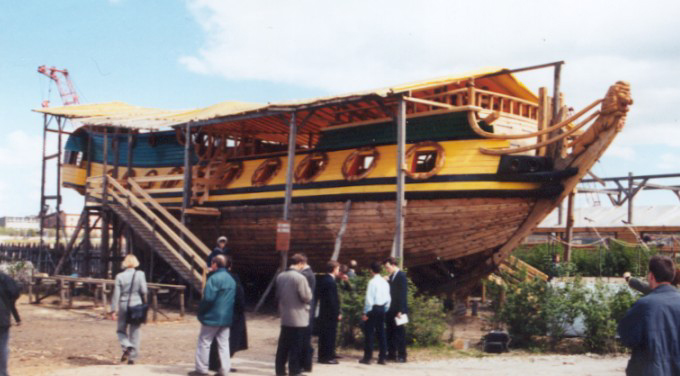
Reception and tour of the guests

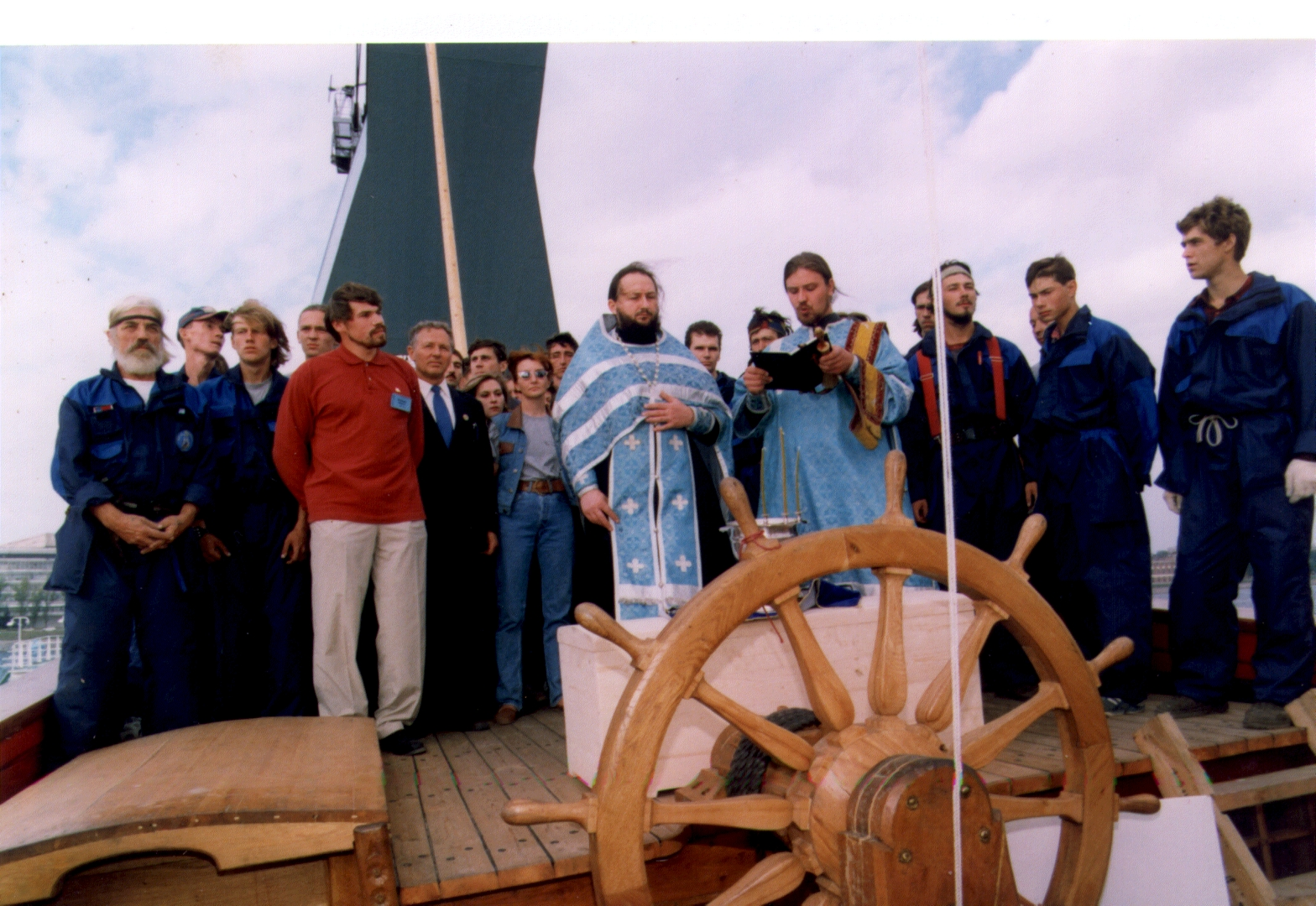
The ceremony of the baptism on the aft deck

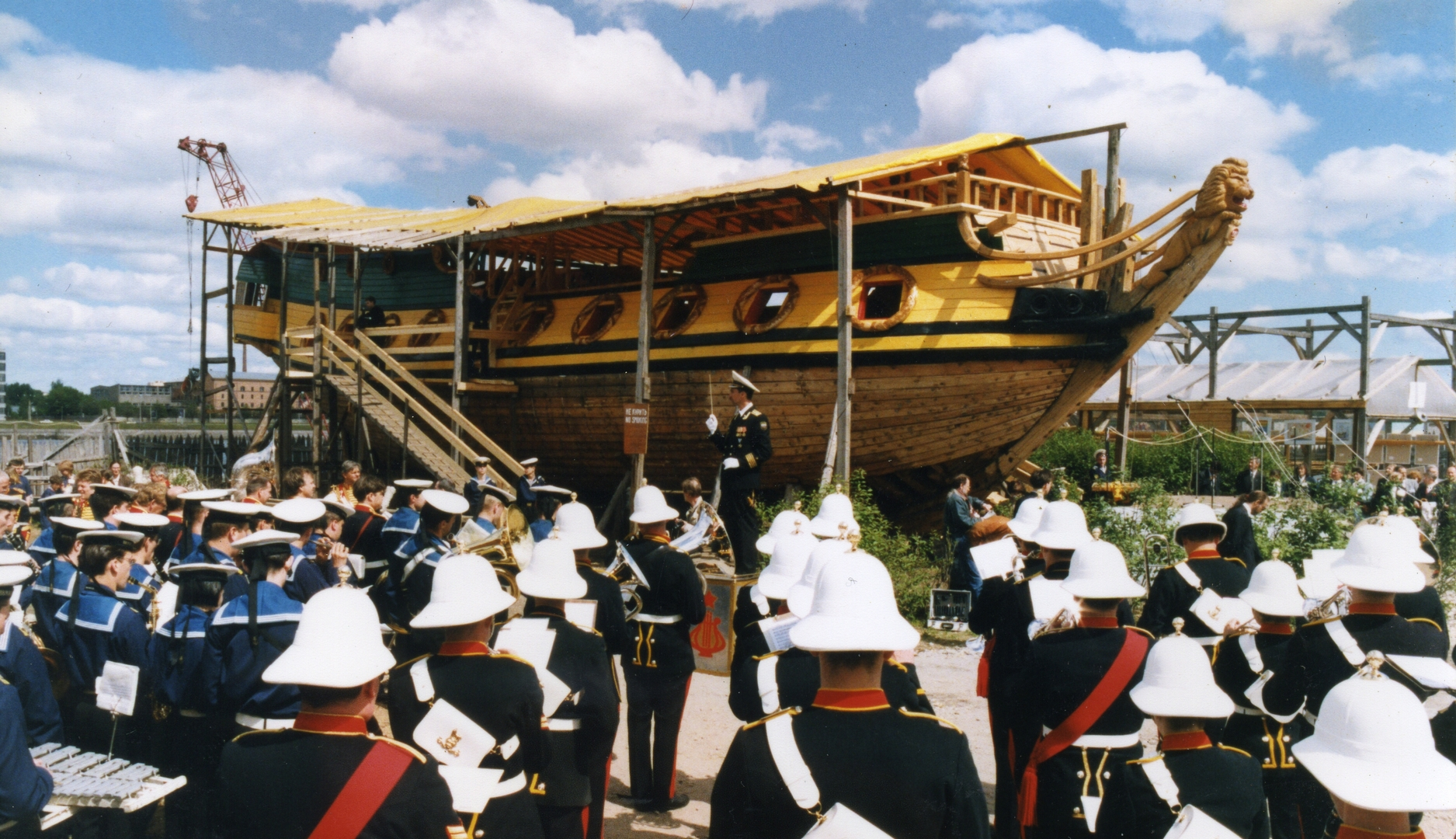
Mariniersband uplifts the ceremony

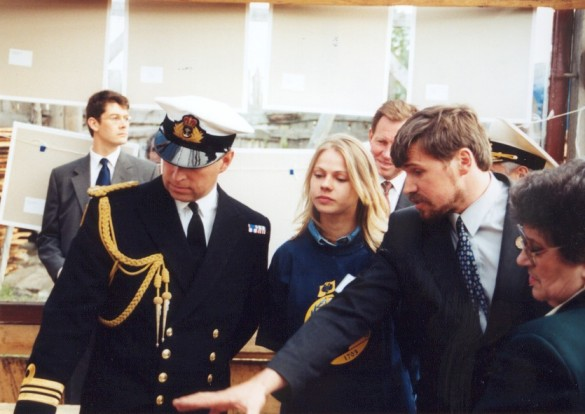
Explanation and discussion with Prince Andrew and entourage

Also the following winter many accessories and parts were manufactured, the rudder the figurehead were painted,
and of course the final transom, with all decorations, and some 'spars' of pine, such as ra's, foresail,
bowsprit, mizzen and large mast (all masts consist of 3 parts).

=== 1999 ===
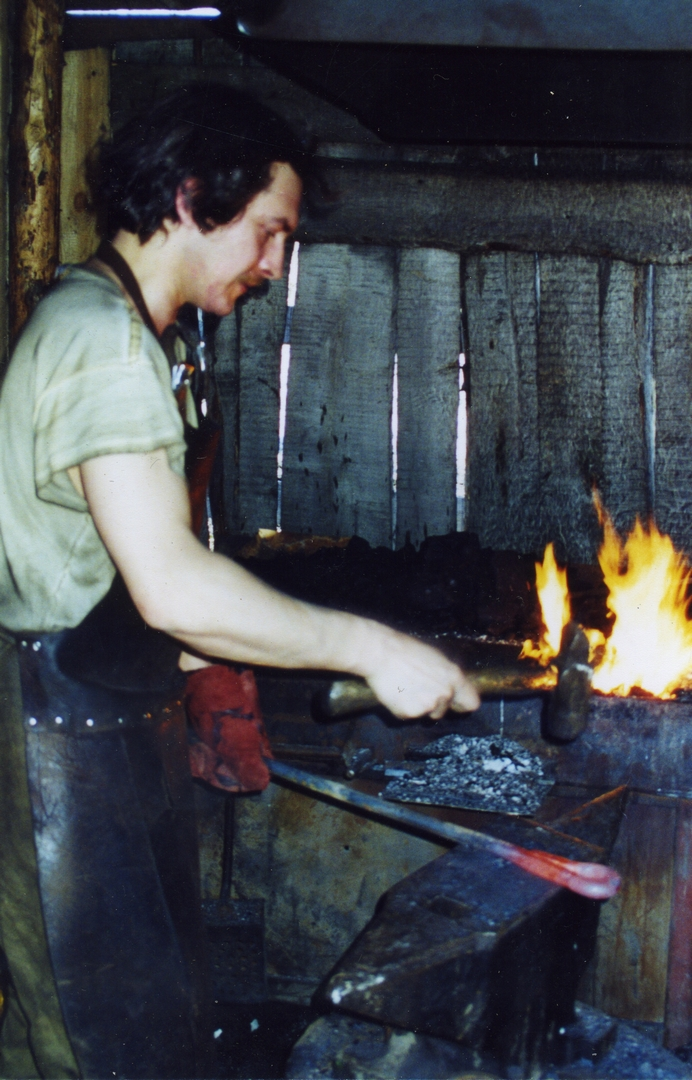
Blacksmith at the fire

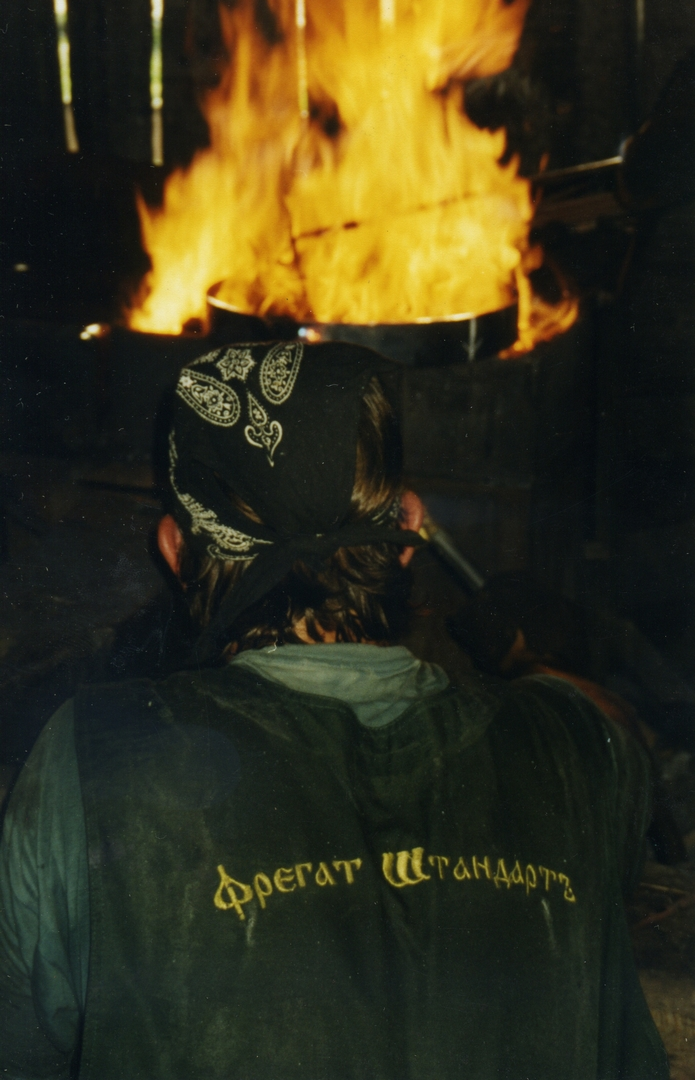
....for all ironwork

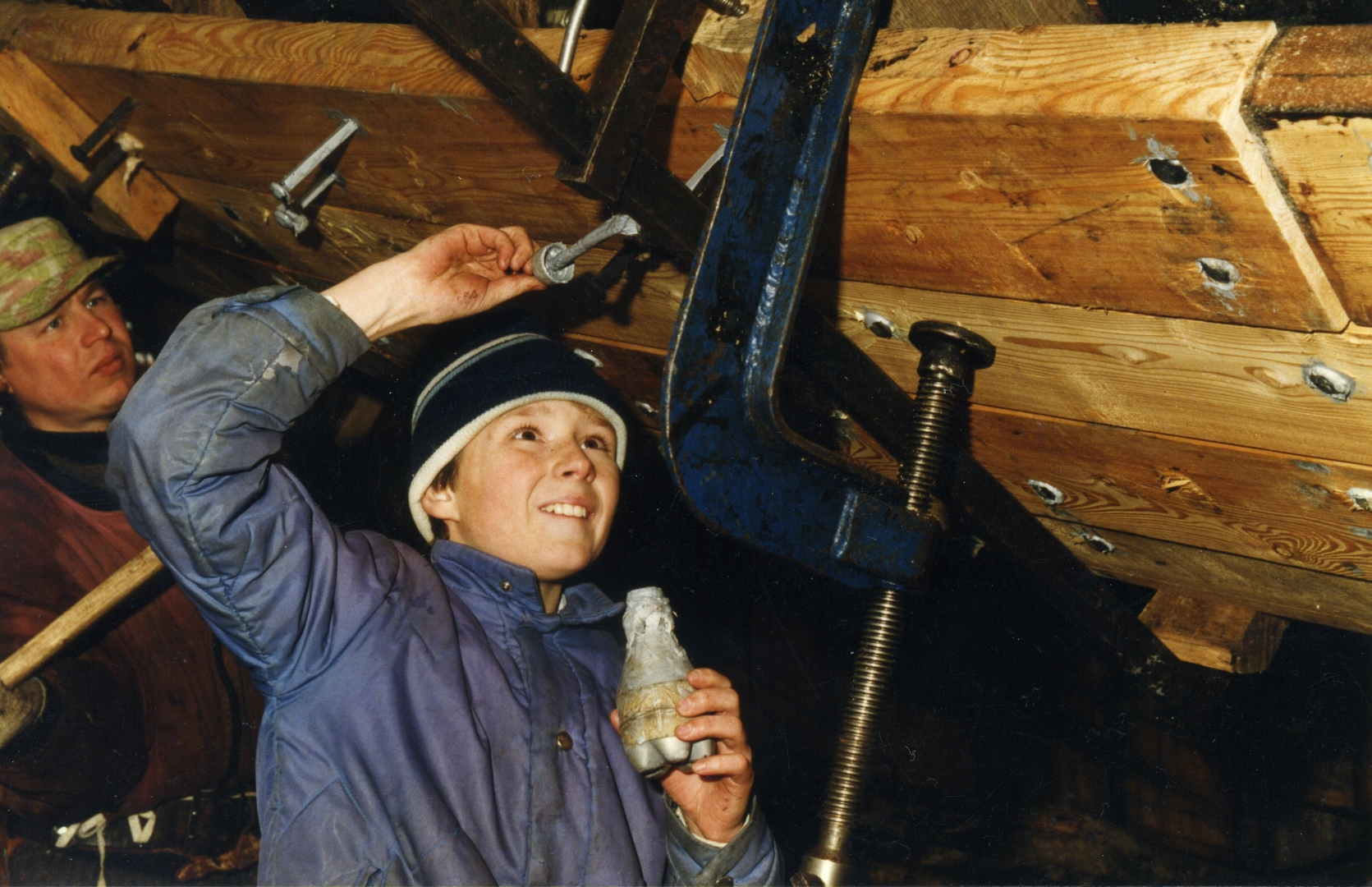
The forged nails are given a tarnish and are then hammered in.

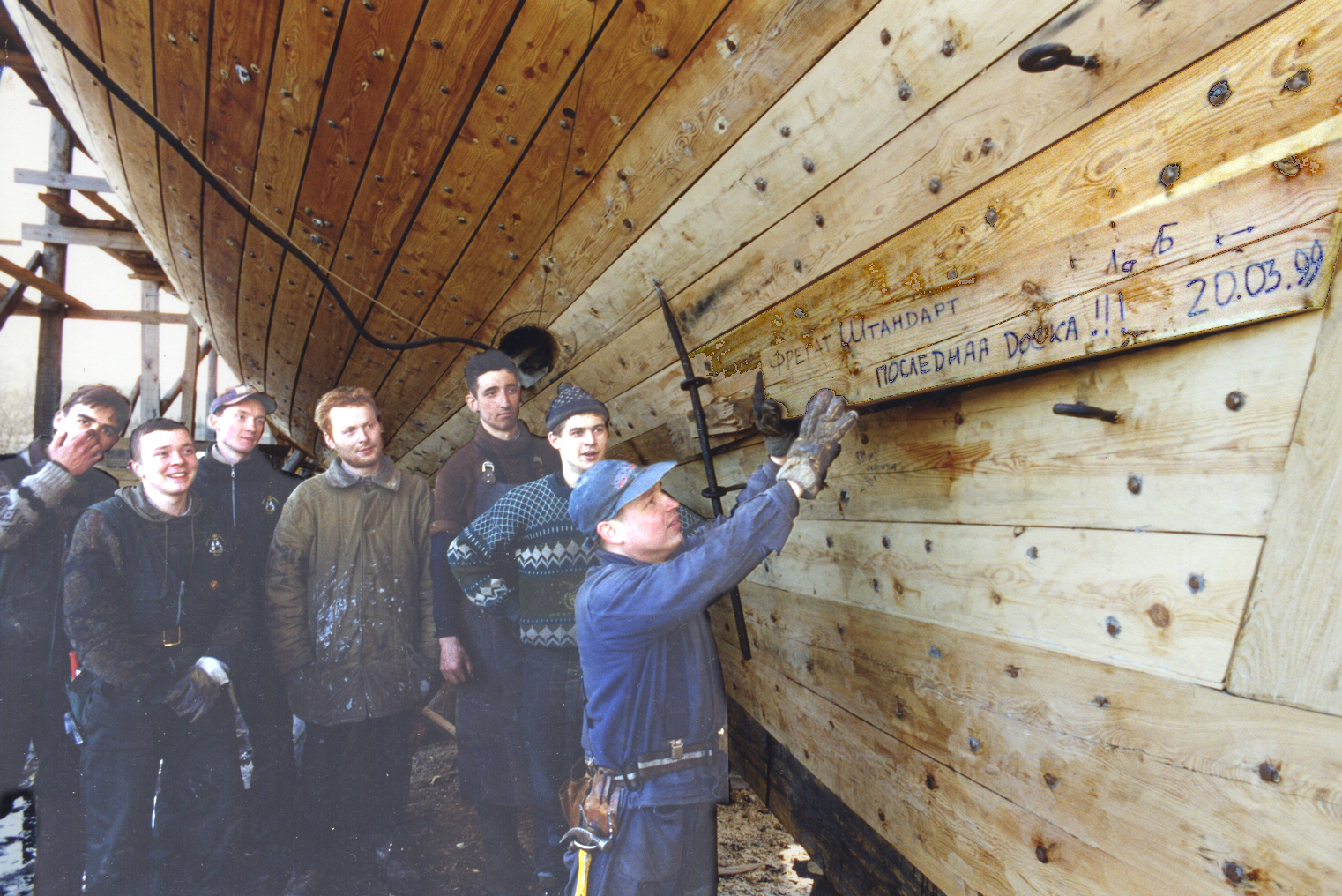
March 20! Great interest in the last skin plank

The sawing, steaming, bending and placement of the skin planks had continued all along until the last one was placed on March 20, 1999.
The whole summer there was caulking and painting.

==== Carving ====
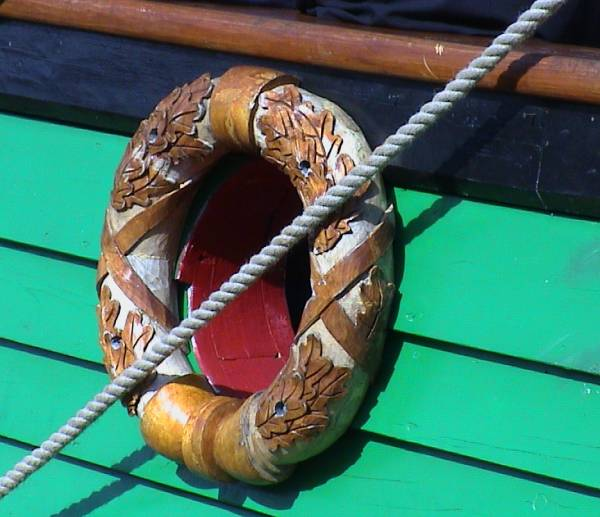
A small laurel wreath on the stern

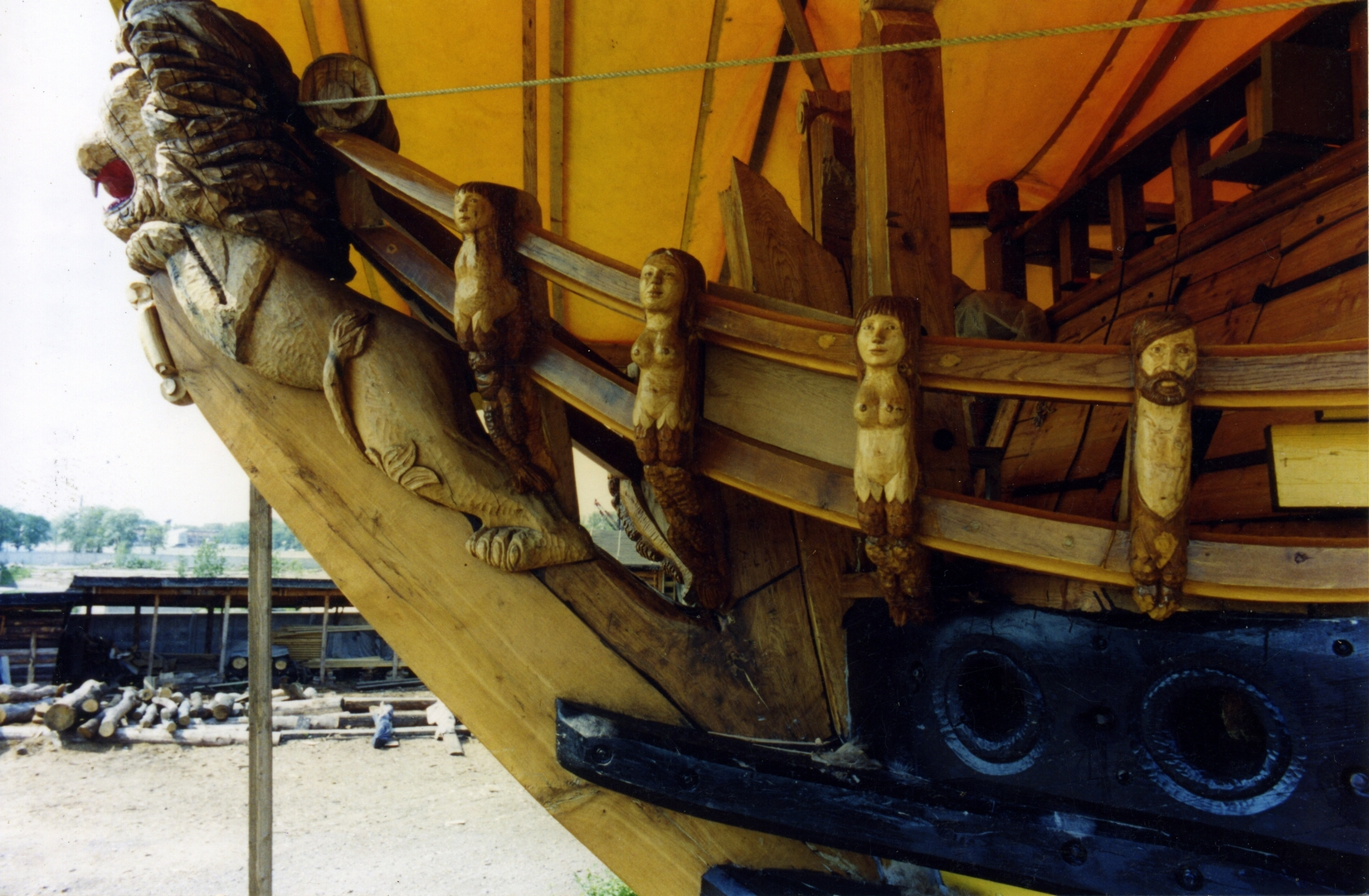
The mermaids on the galleon,

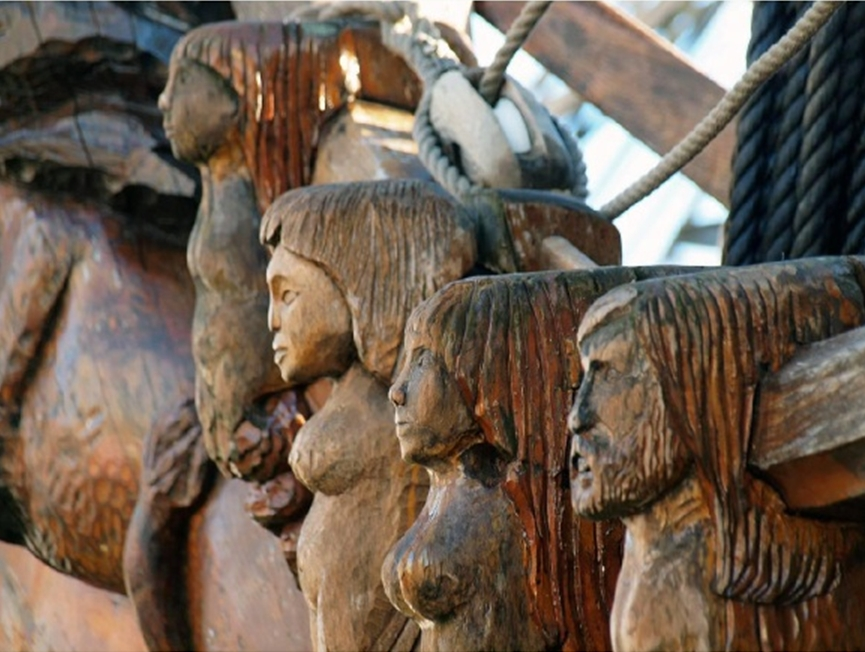
...with faces of the first volunteers, who thus experience all the journeys

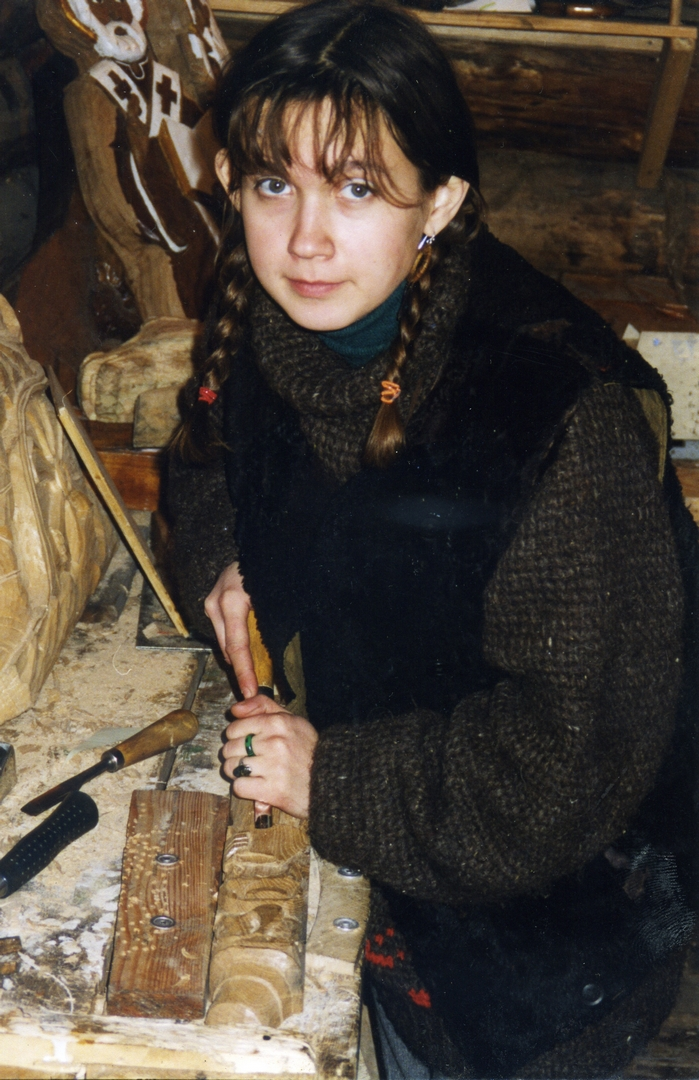
One of the sculptors: Katja

==== Rigging ====
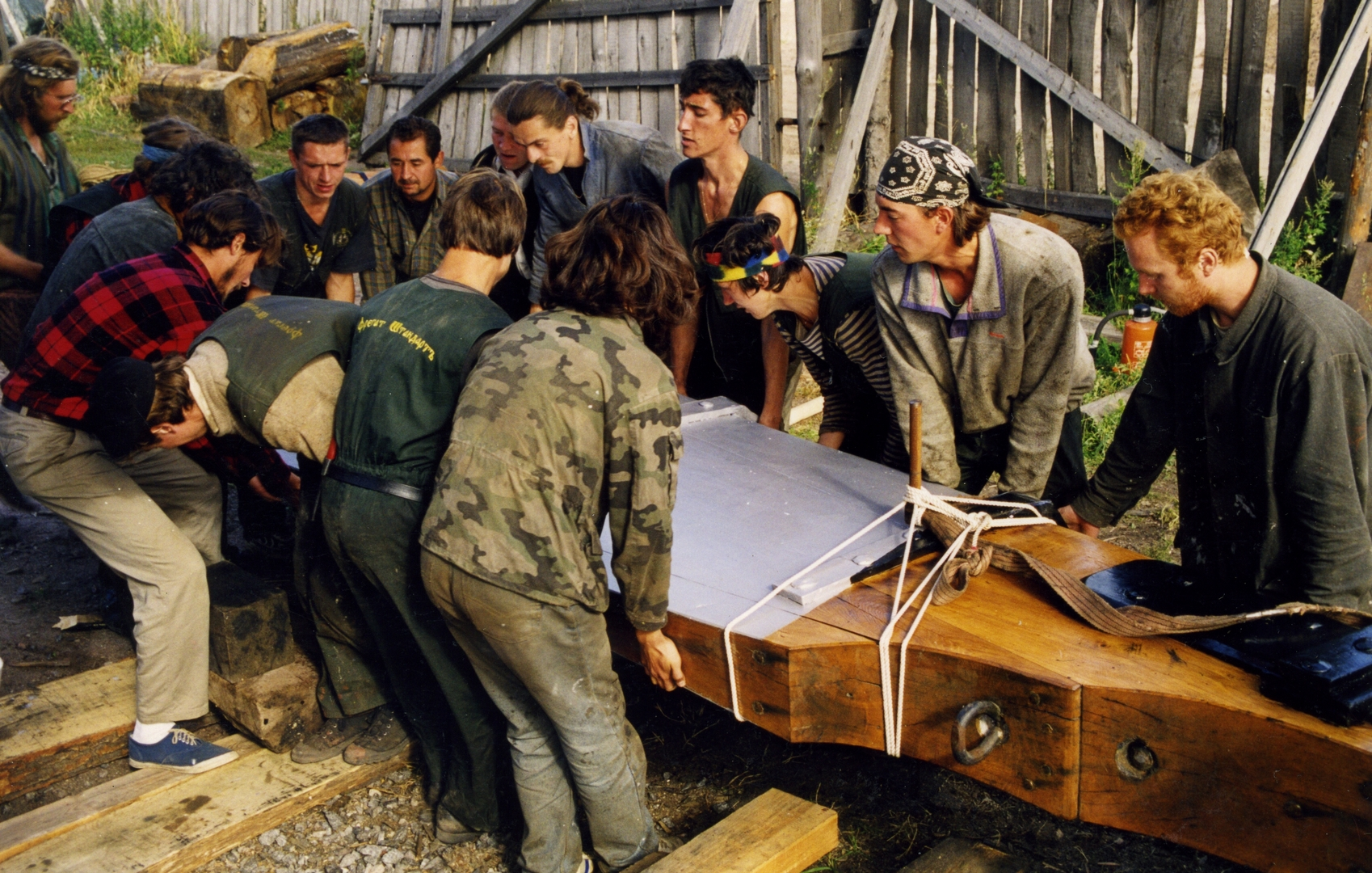
Without equipment the rudder blade had to be brought to the crane...

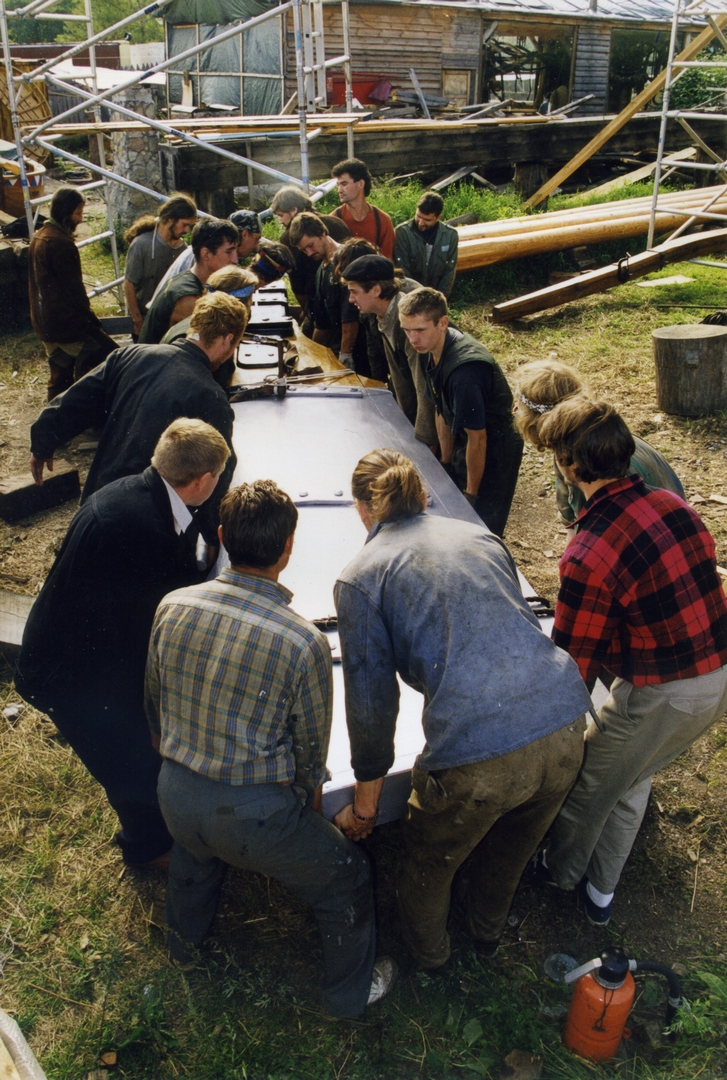
...but many hands make light work.

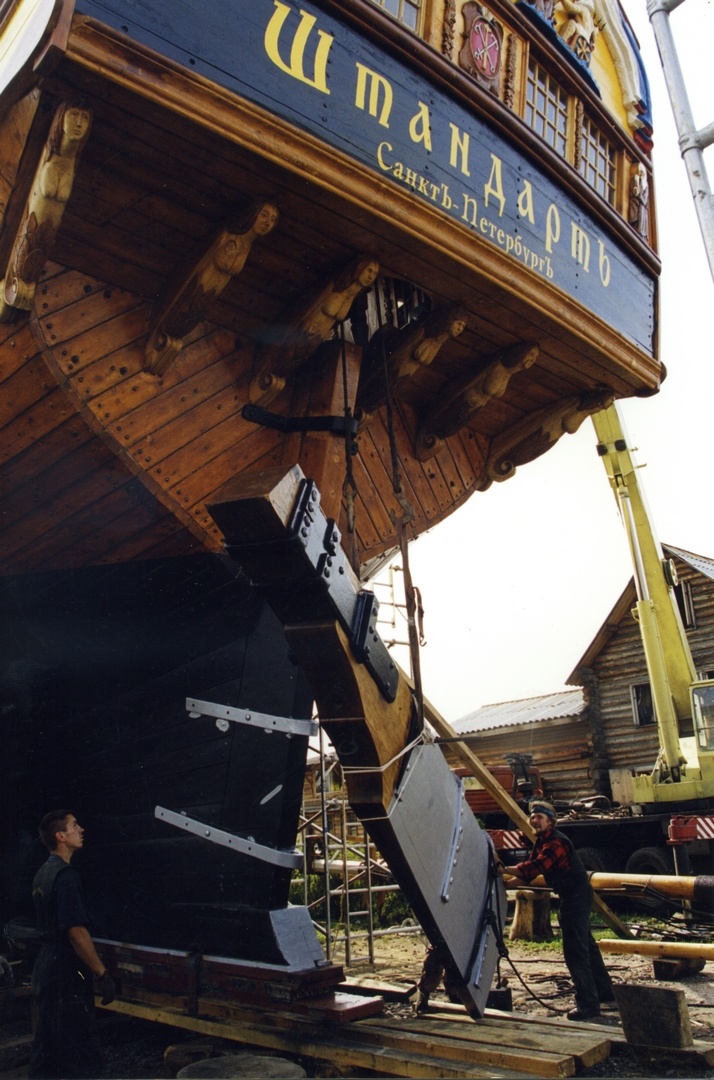
Hanging the rudder is just a delicate job

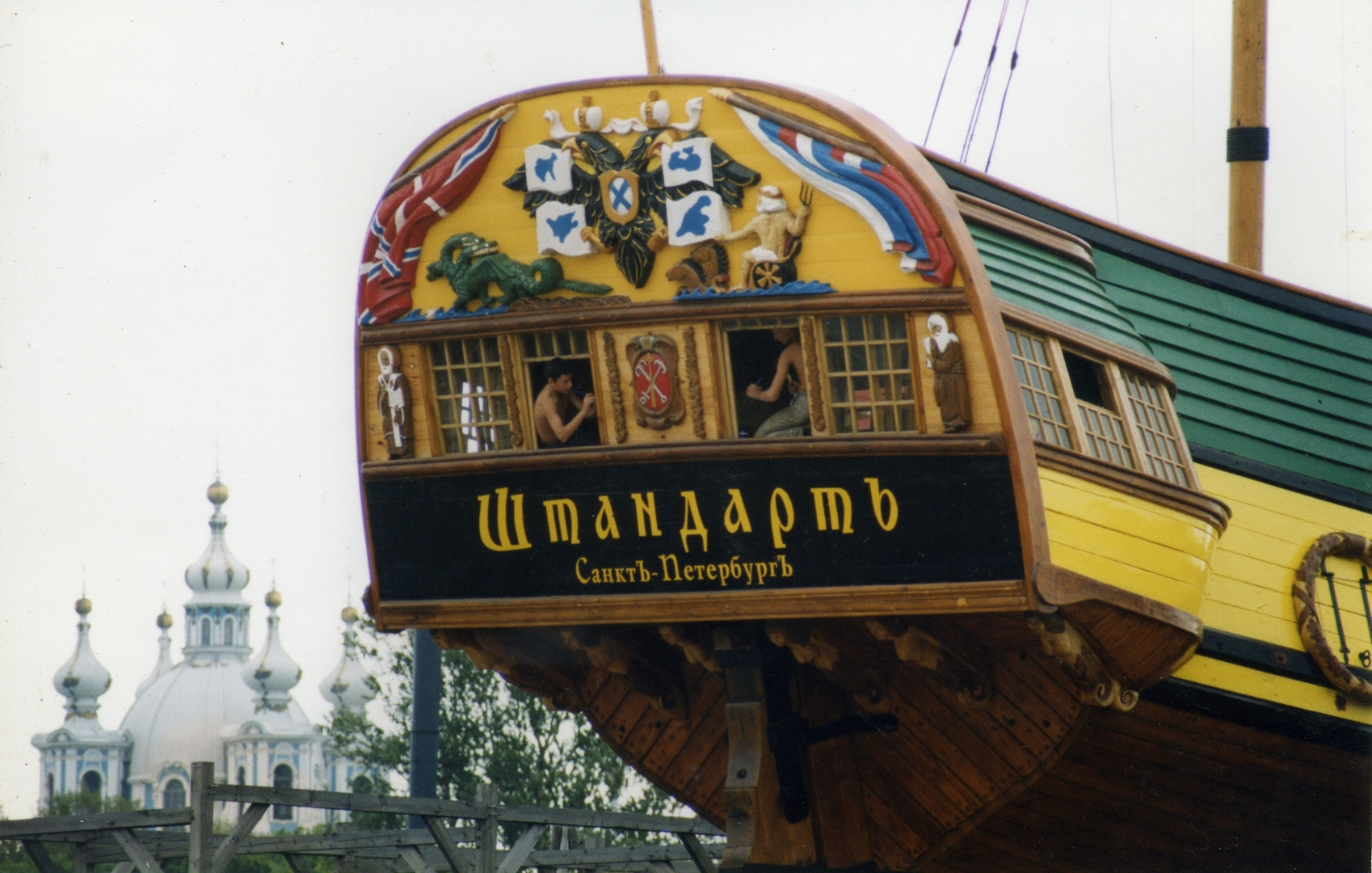
The finishing details are being made to the transom with the correct name and the "captains" lodge
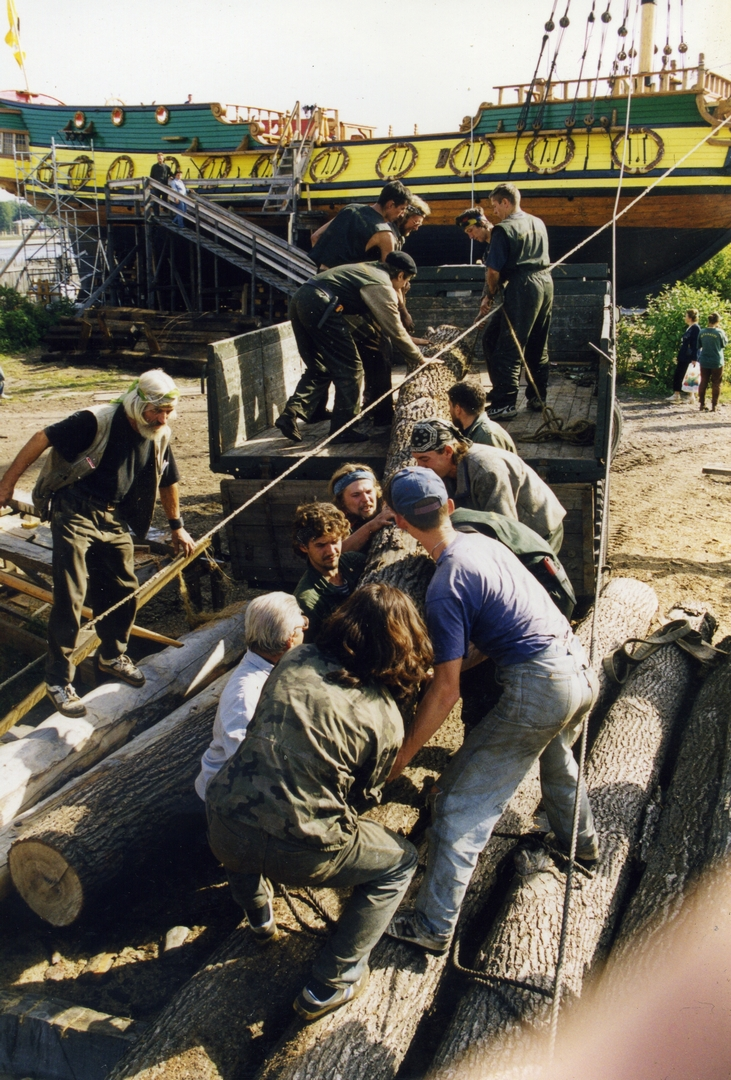
A pine tree for the main mast..., still a lot of work to do..

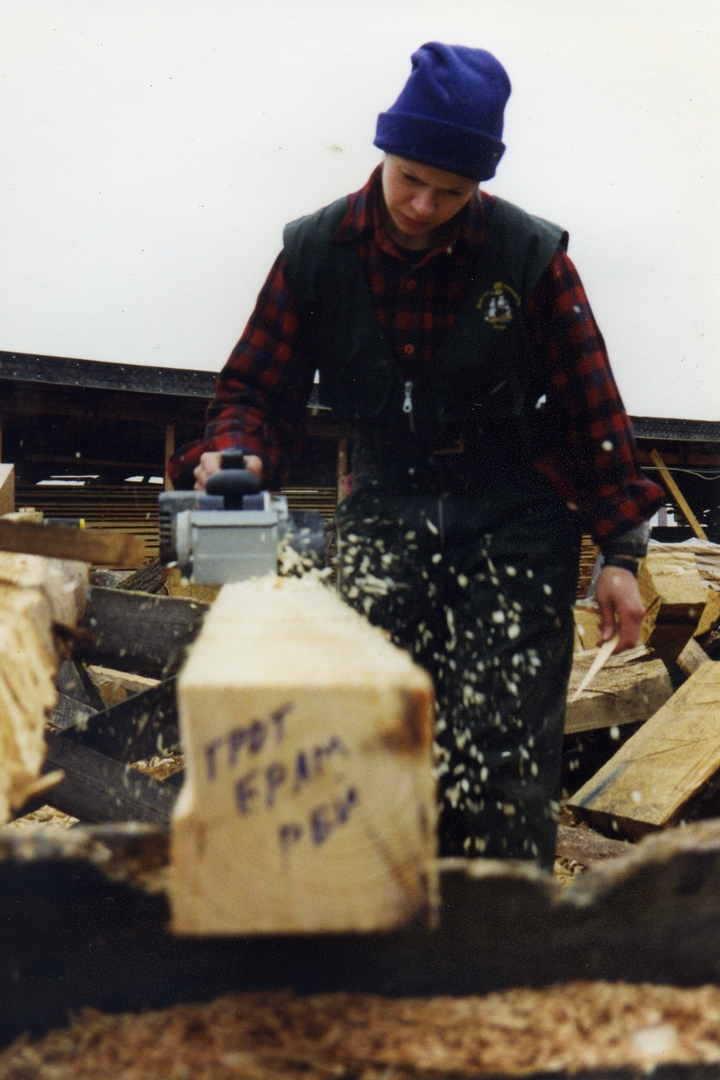
from square with the chainsaw to....

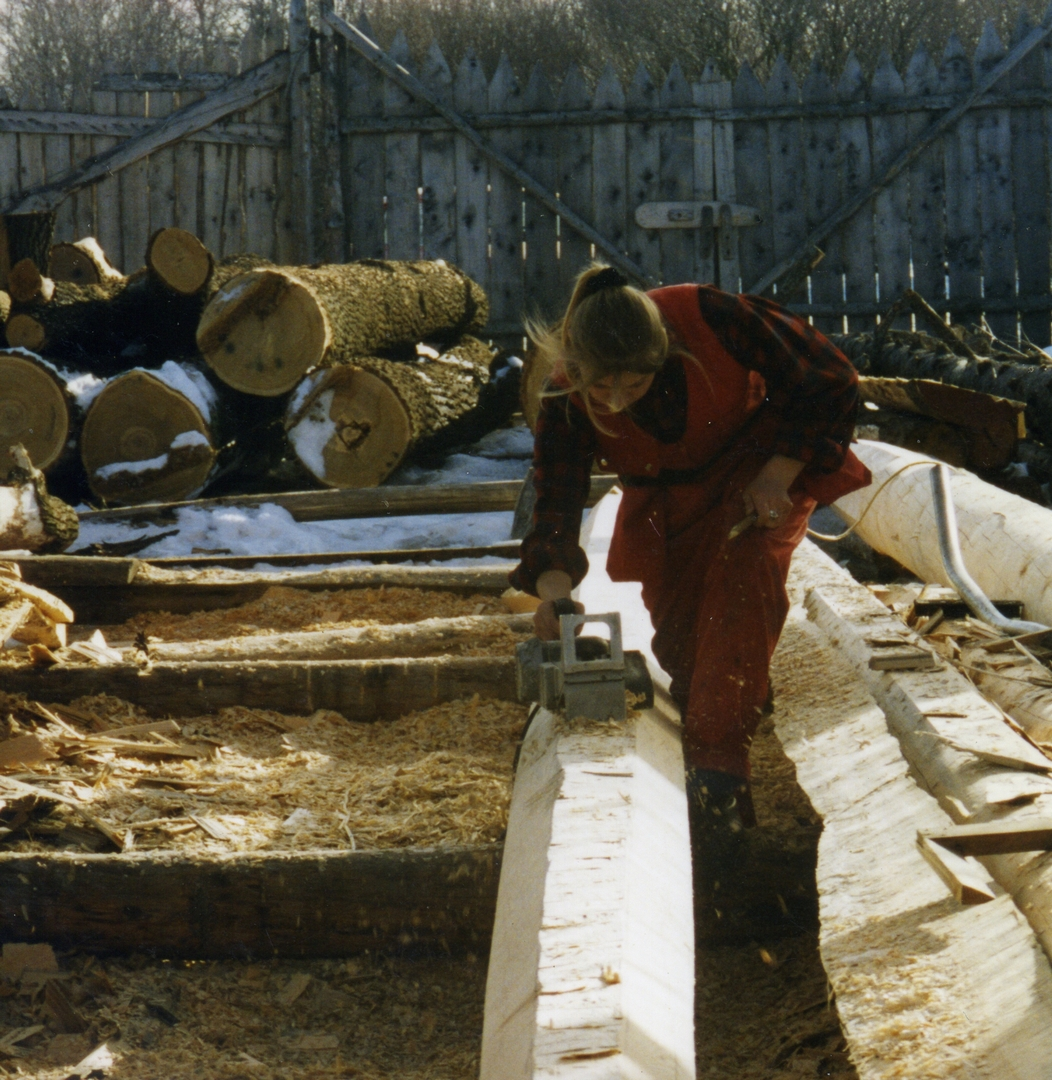
....octangular with the planer,

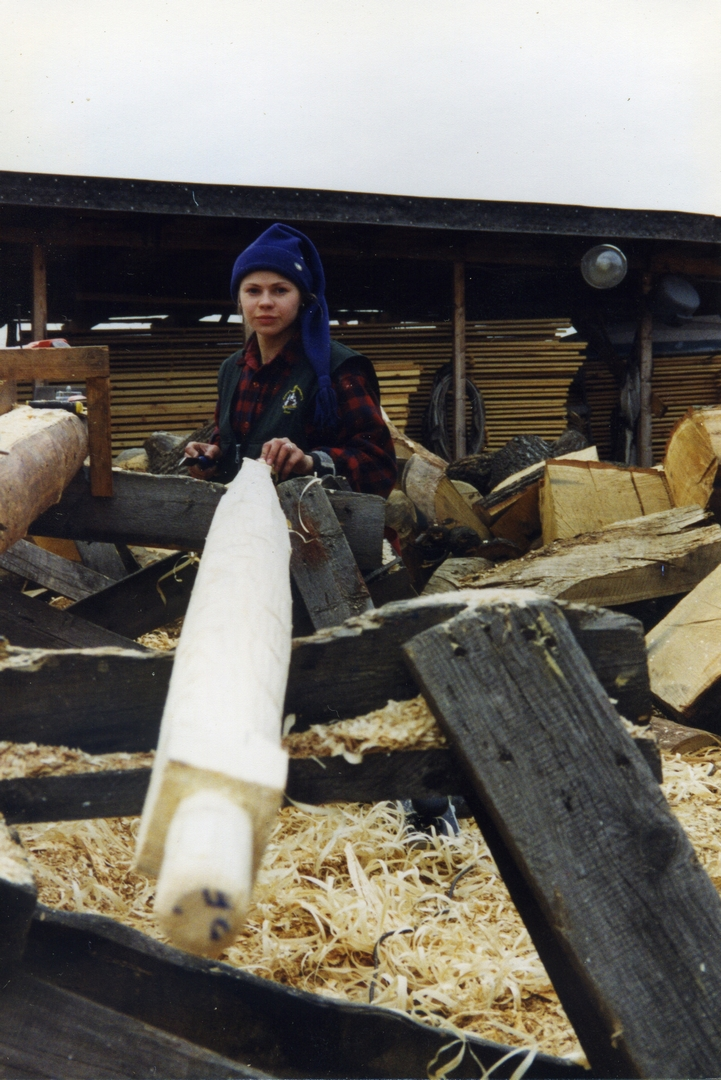
and then round with a suitable bottom piece.
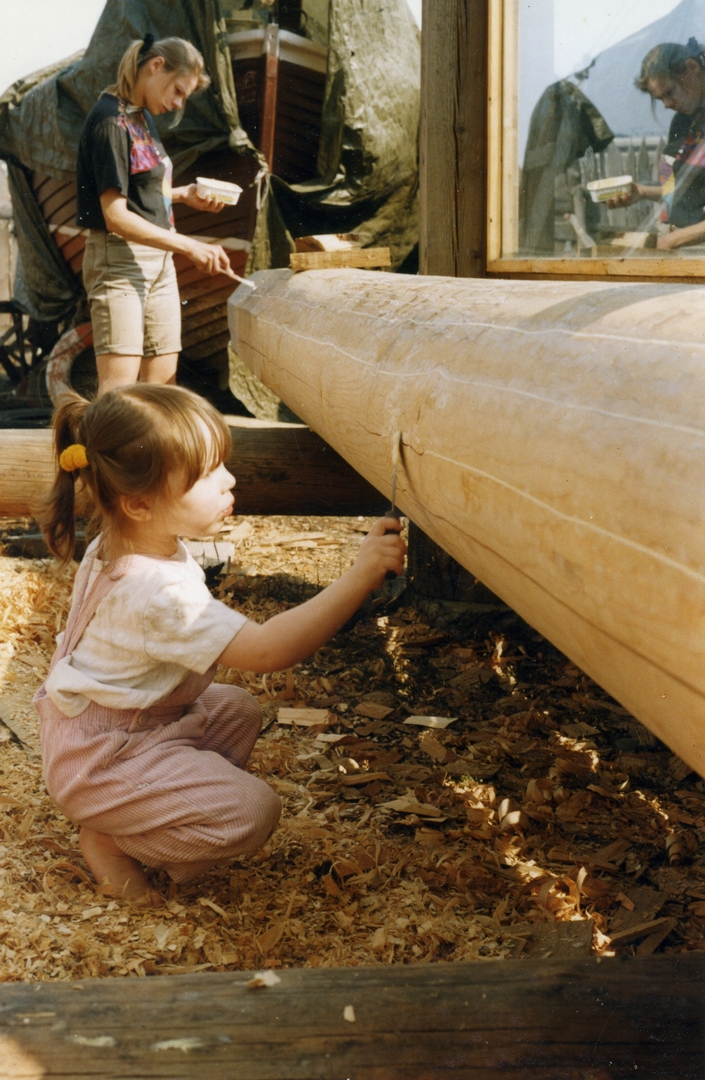
Everyone helps, even the youngest.

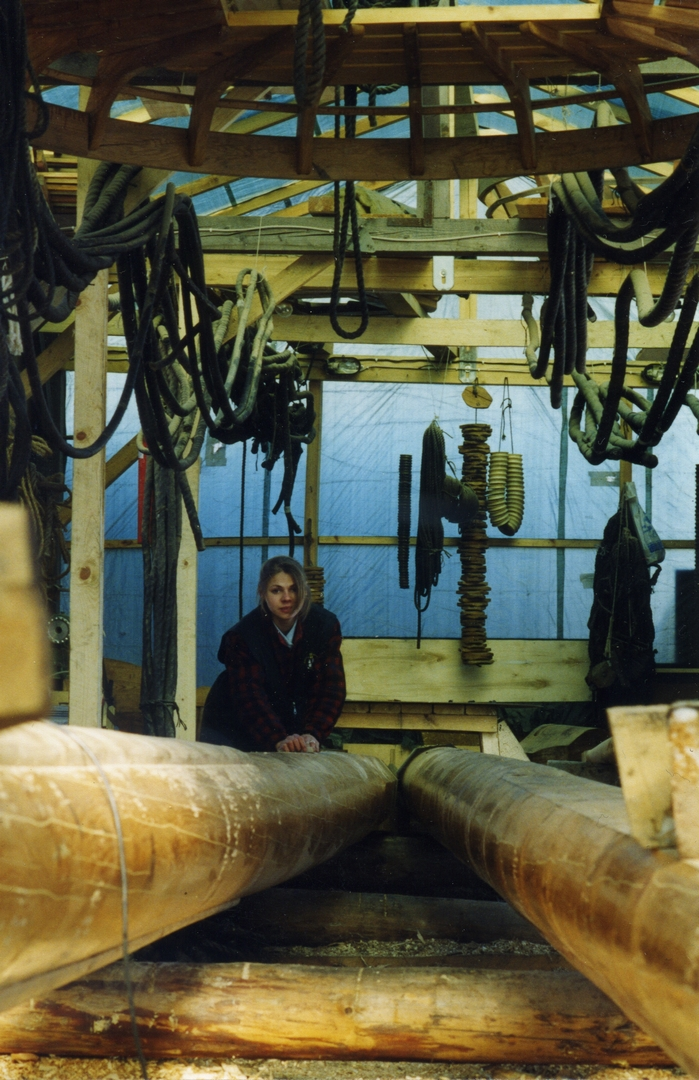
This is how the stock of spars grows,

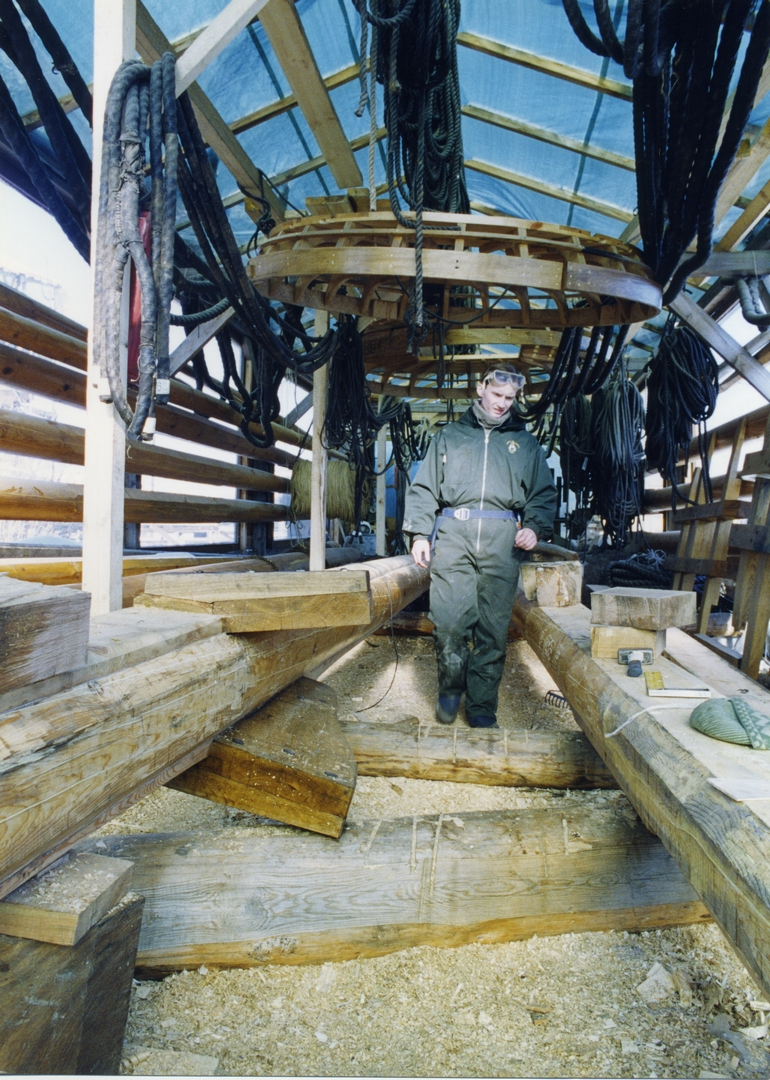
the Mainmast-top and more masts,

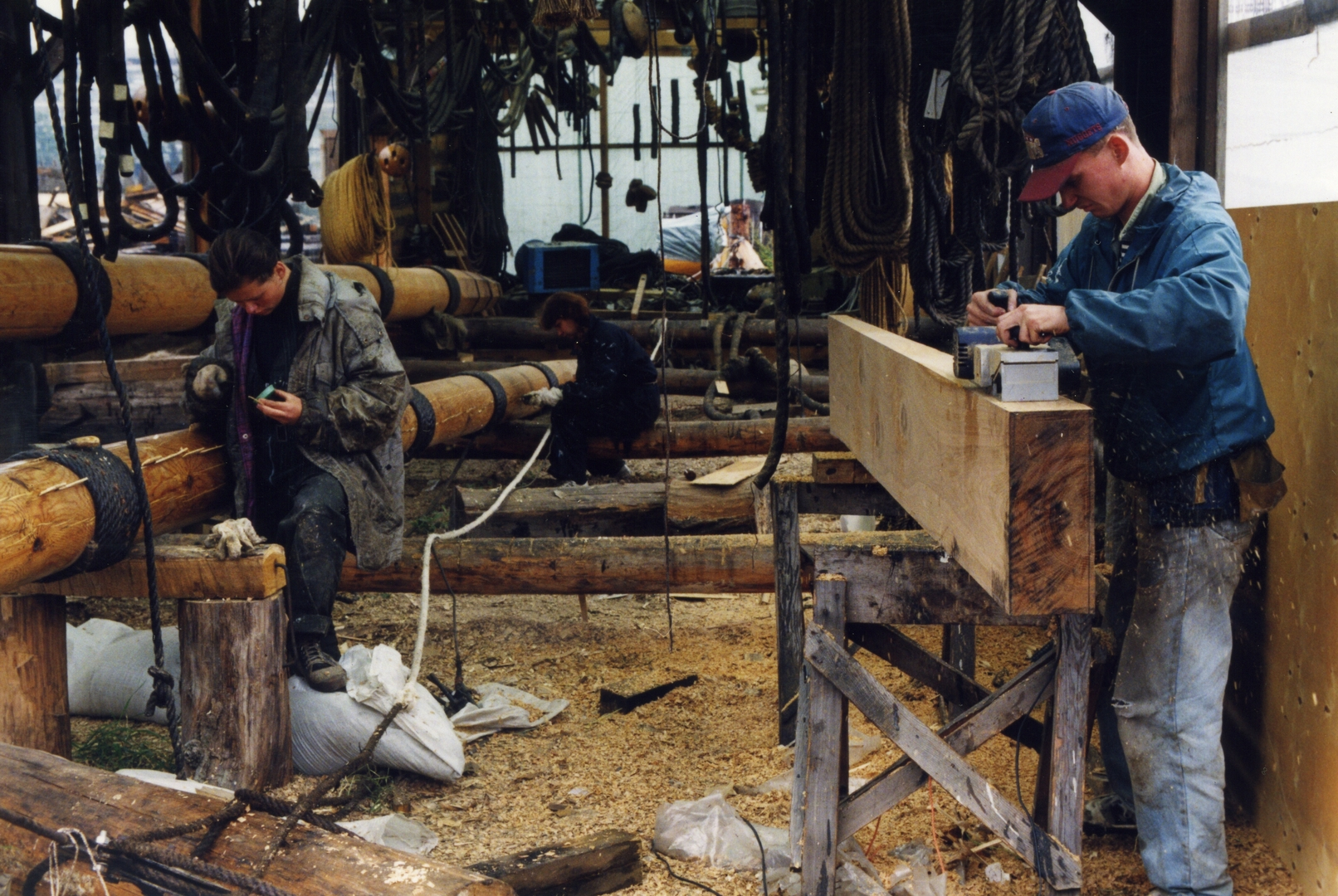
also by craftsmen in training.
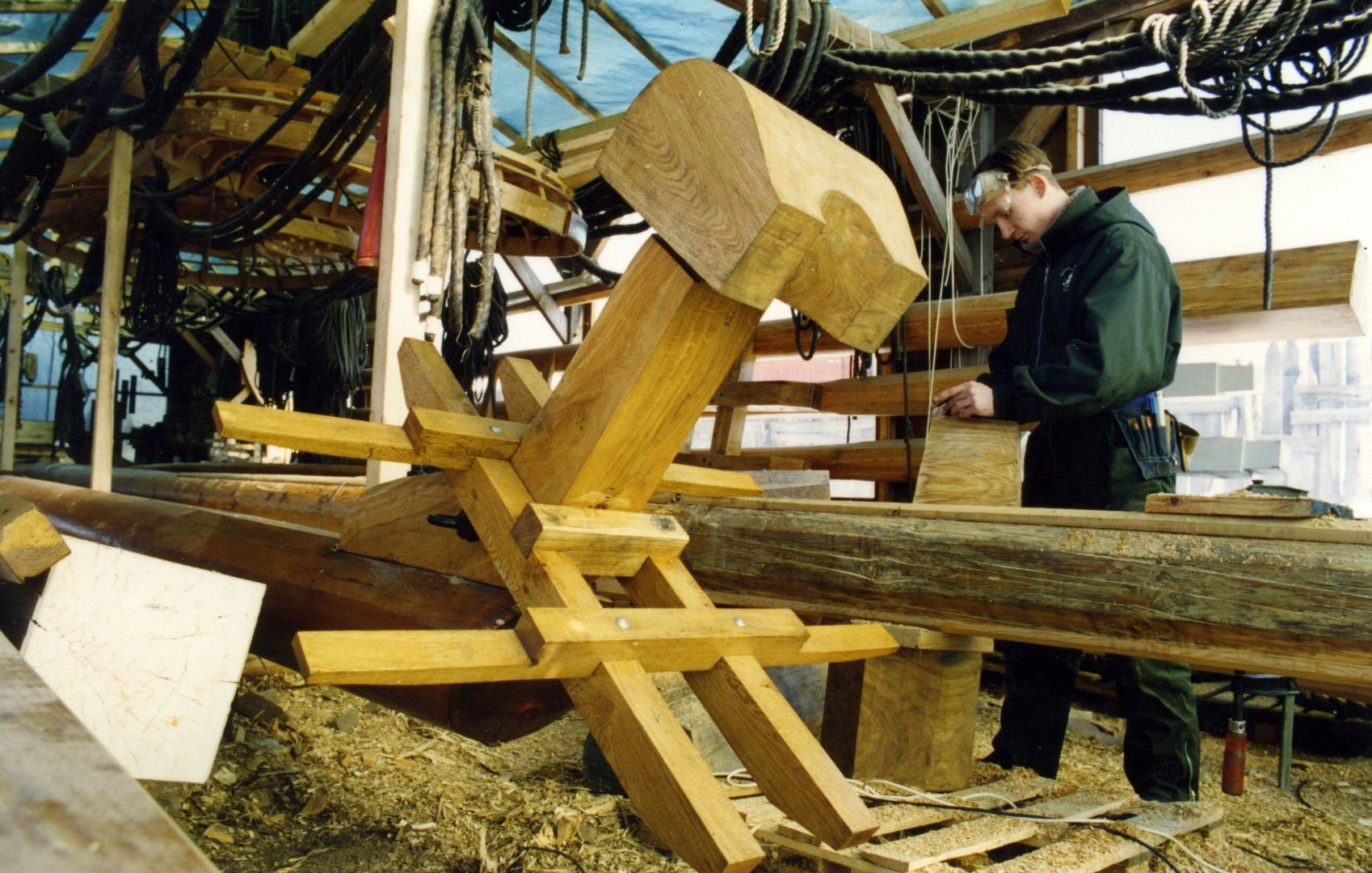
Cap, or "Donkey's head" the connection between main-lowermast and main-topmast, and the crosstrees for the top.

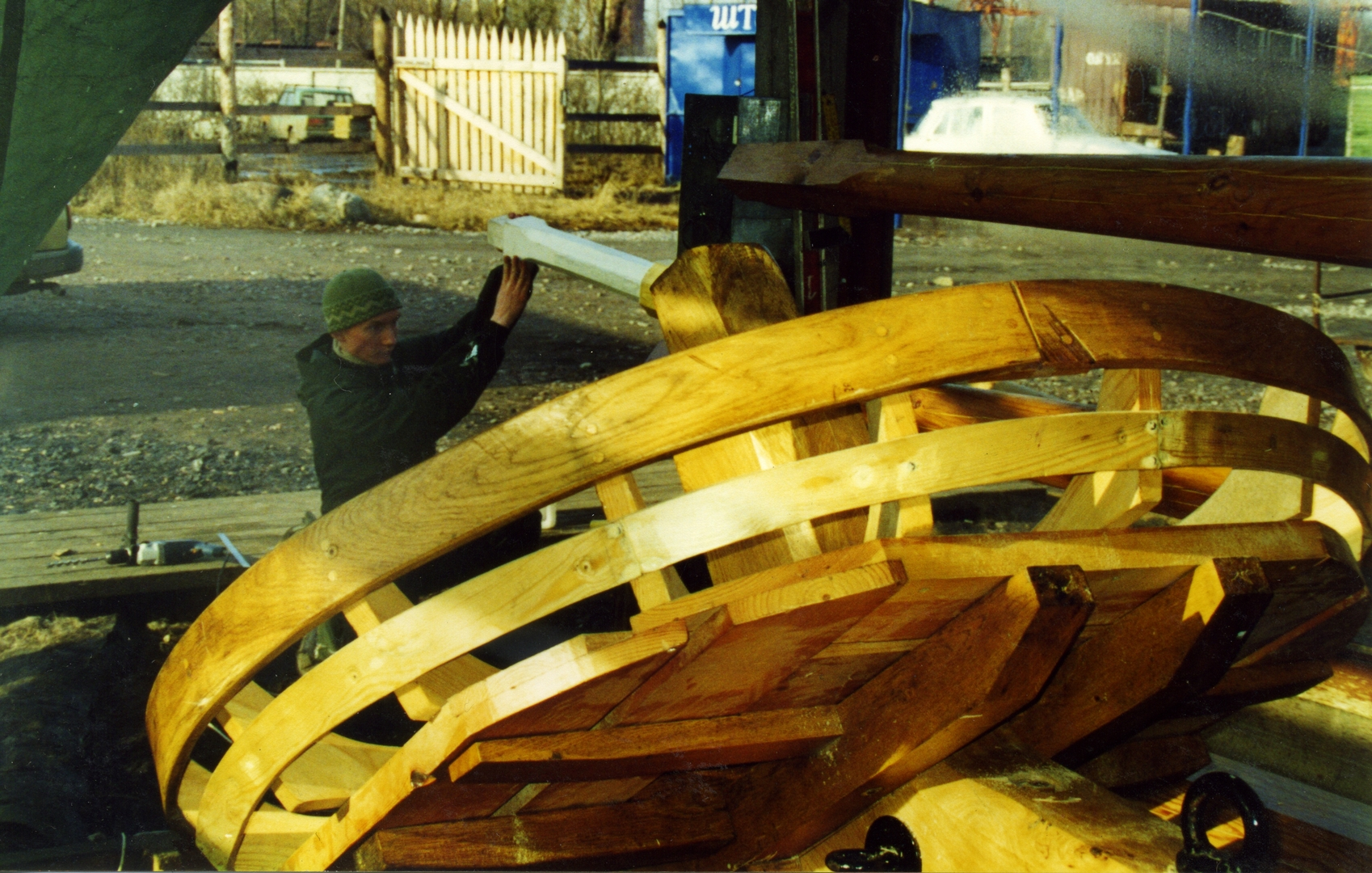
De Foremast-top with crosstrees

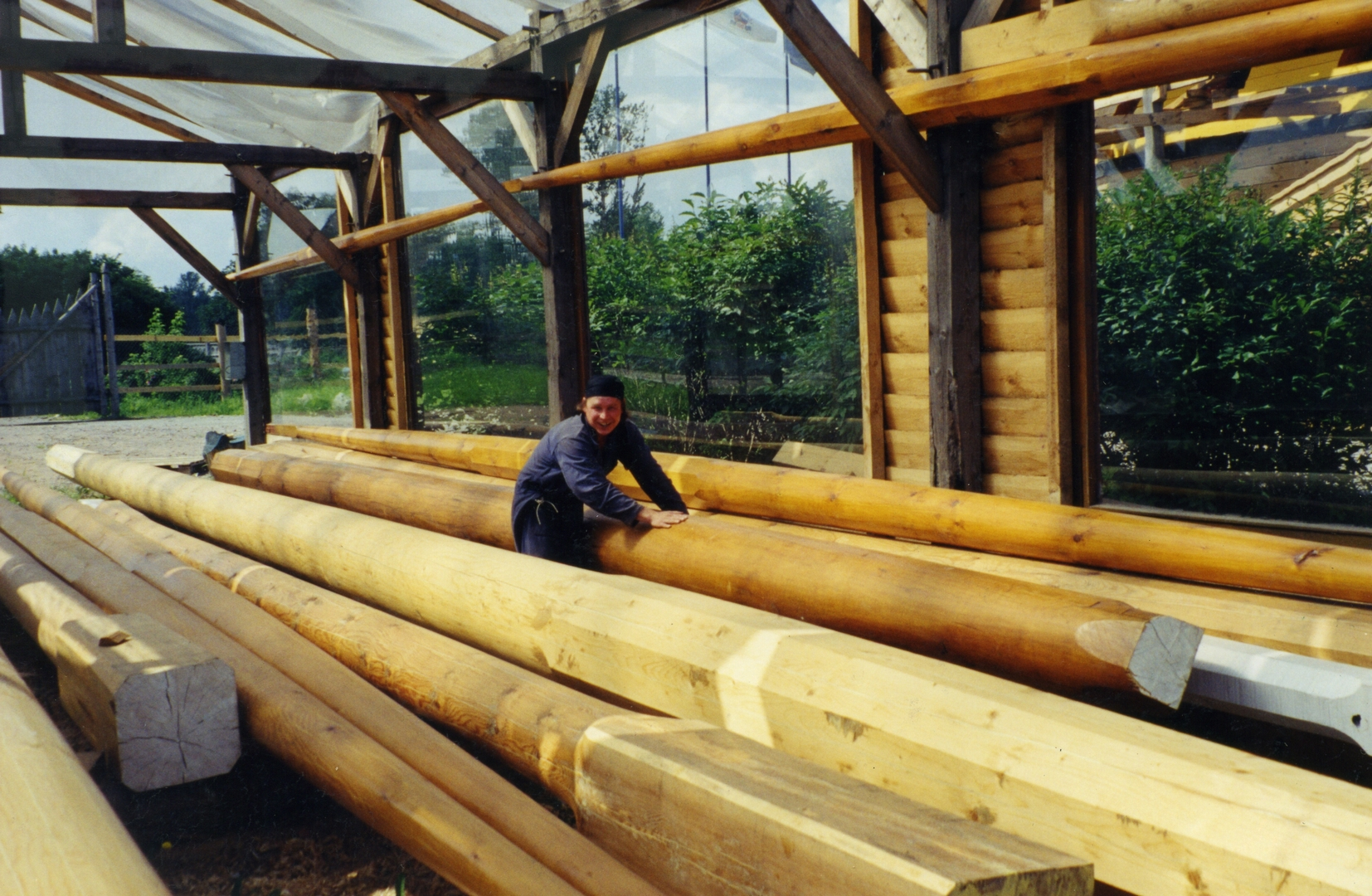
The stock is growing, ready for installation.

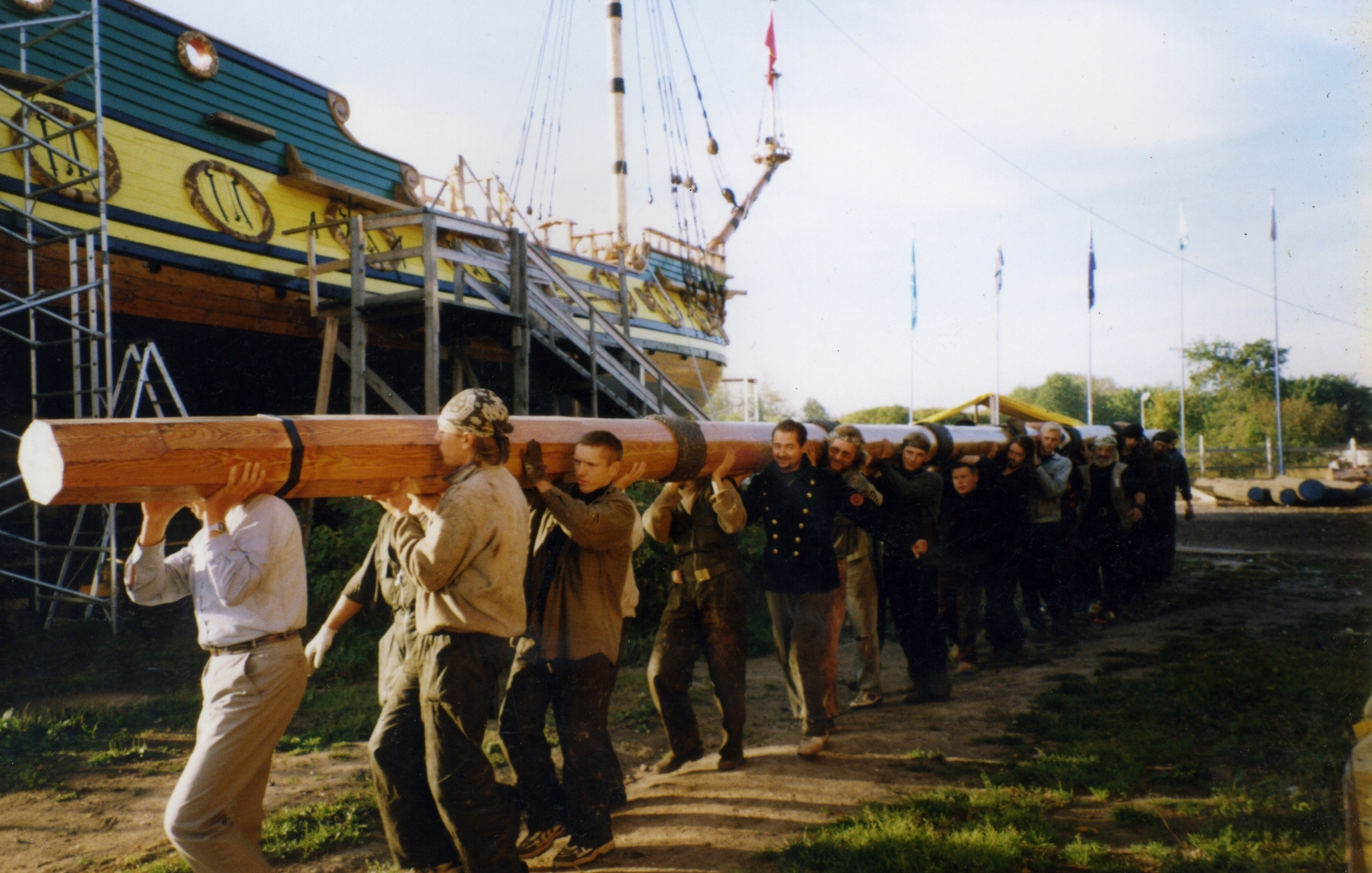
The main-lowermast is ready and will be laid out until after the launch...

==== Launching ====
The rebirth of the first ship of the Russian Baltic Fleet attracted forty thousand Saint Petersburgers on September 4, 1999
to the banks of the Neva. The Frigate measuring 30 by 7 meters, with 28 guns,
two masts and bowsprit with figurehead, was launched into the Neva by a gigantic floating crane, near the Smolny Institute,
the same place where its illustrious predecessor was baptized in 1703.

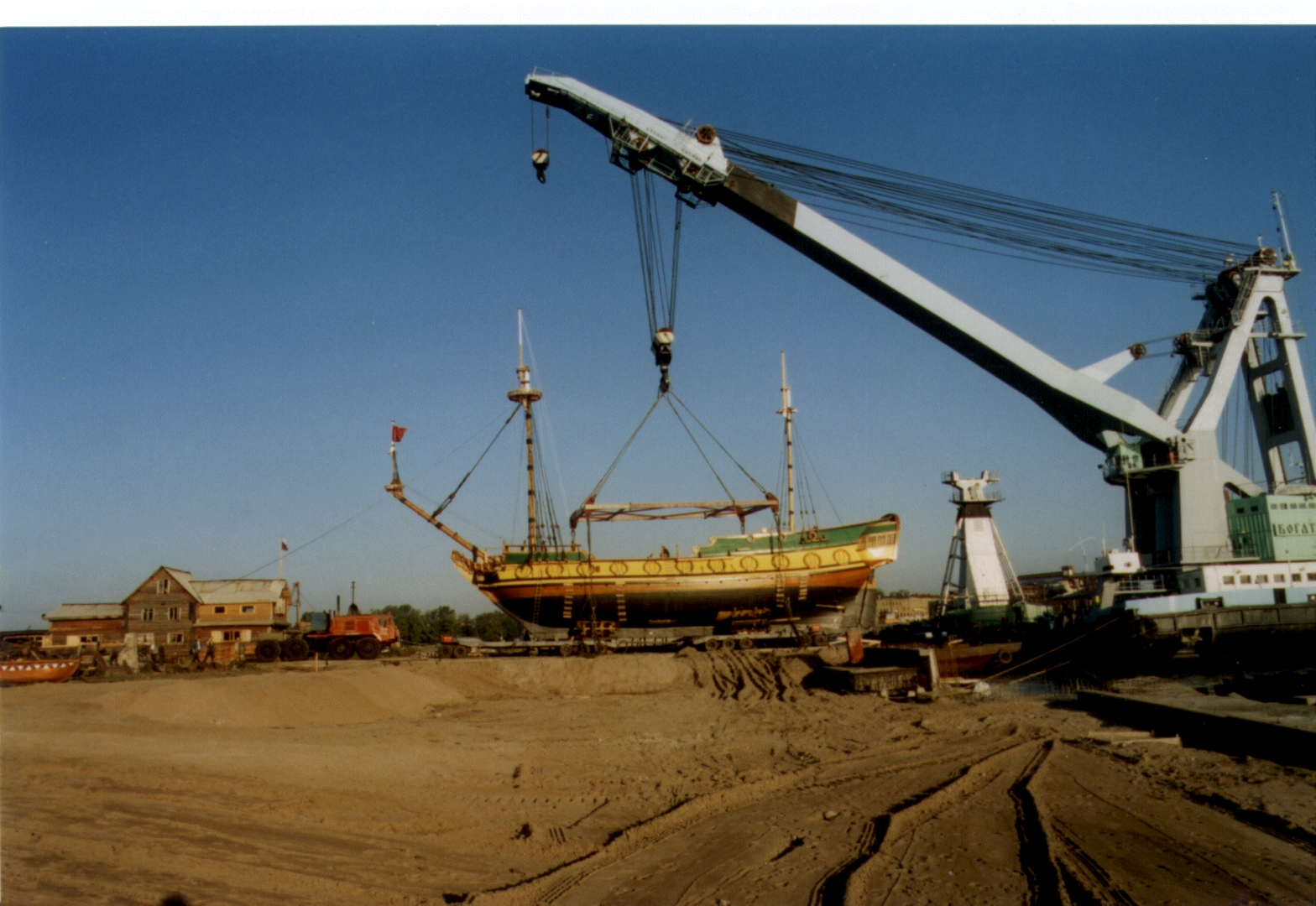
empty terrain and try out the lifting frame

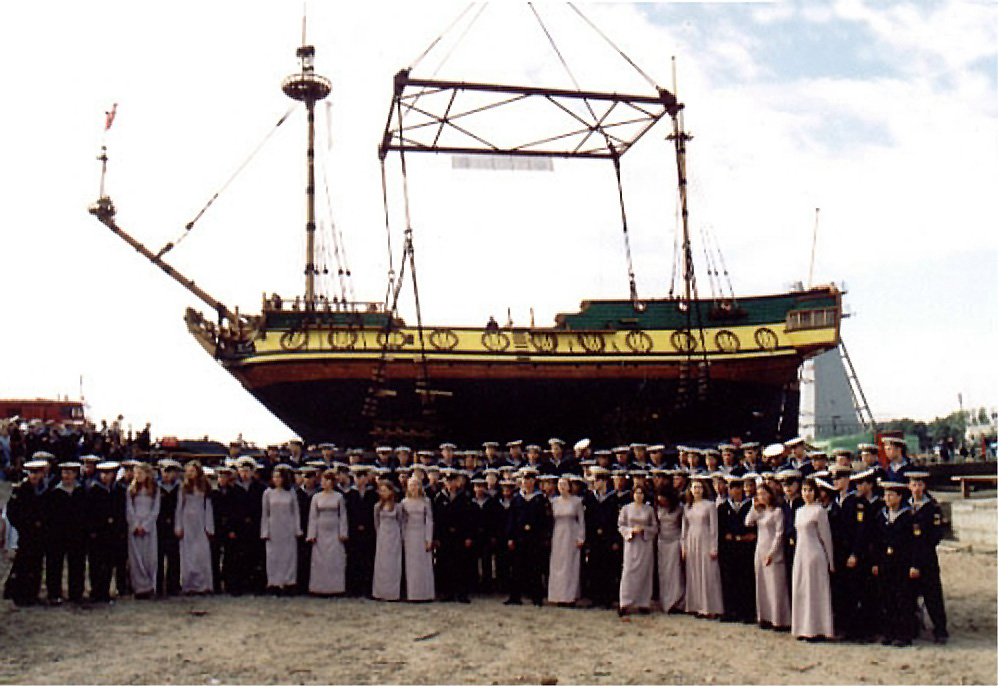
Ready? the choir of Smolny does!

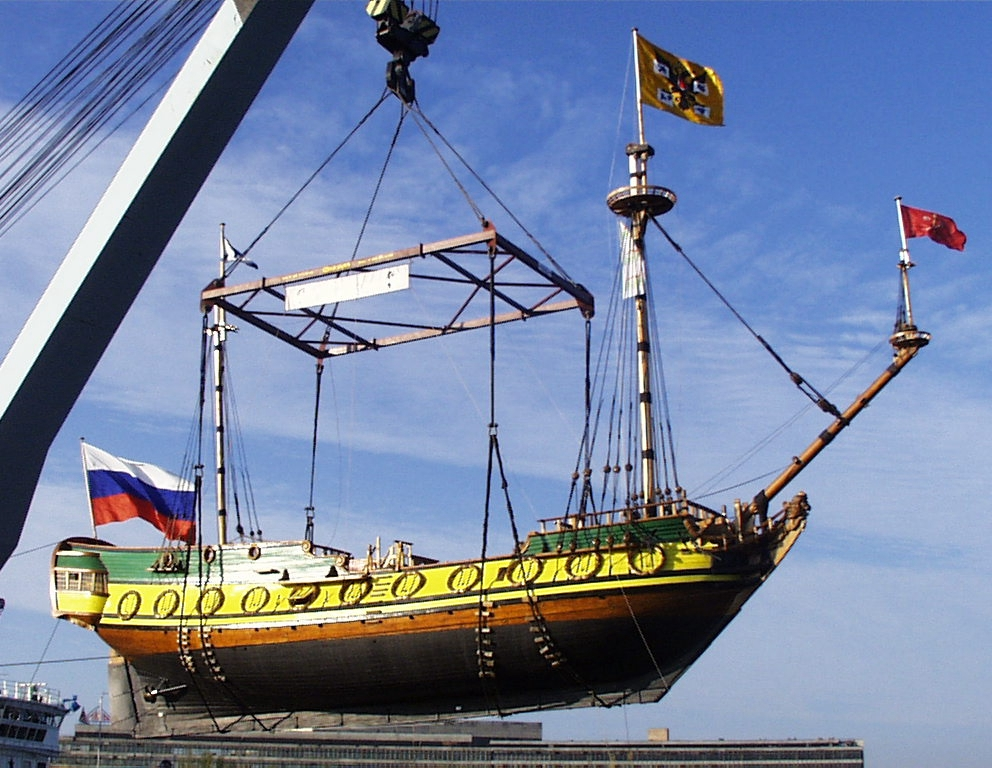
Flags in top

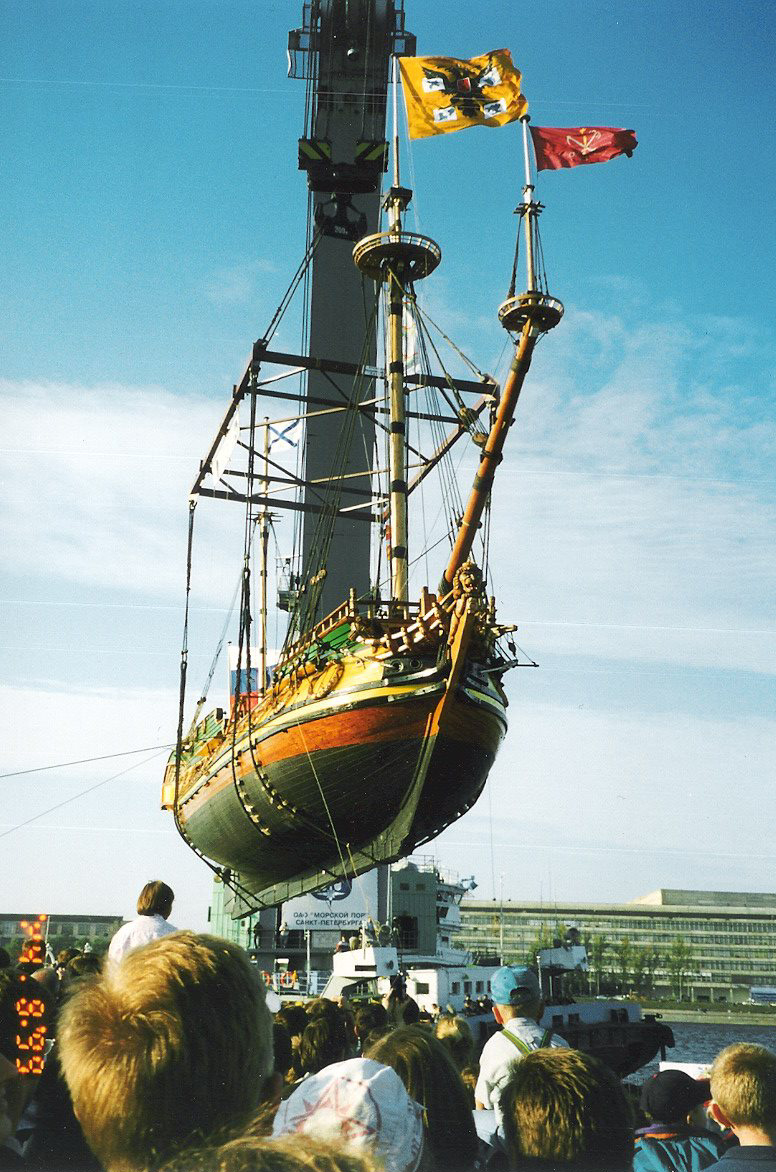
With a thousand-headed audience

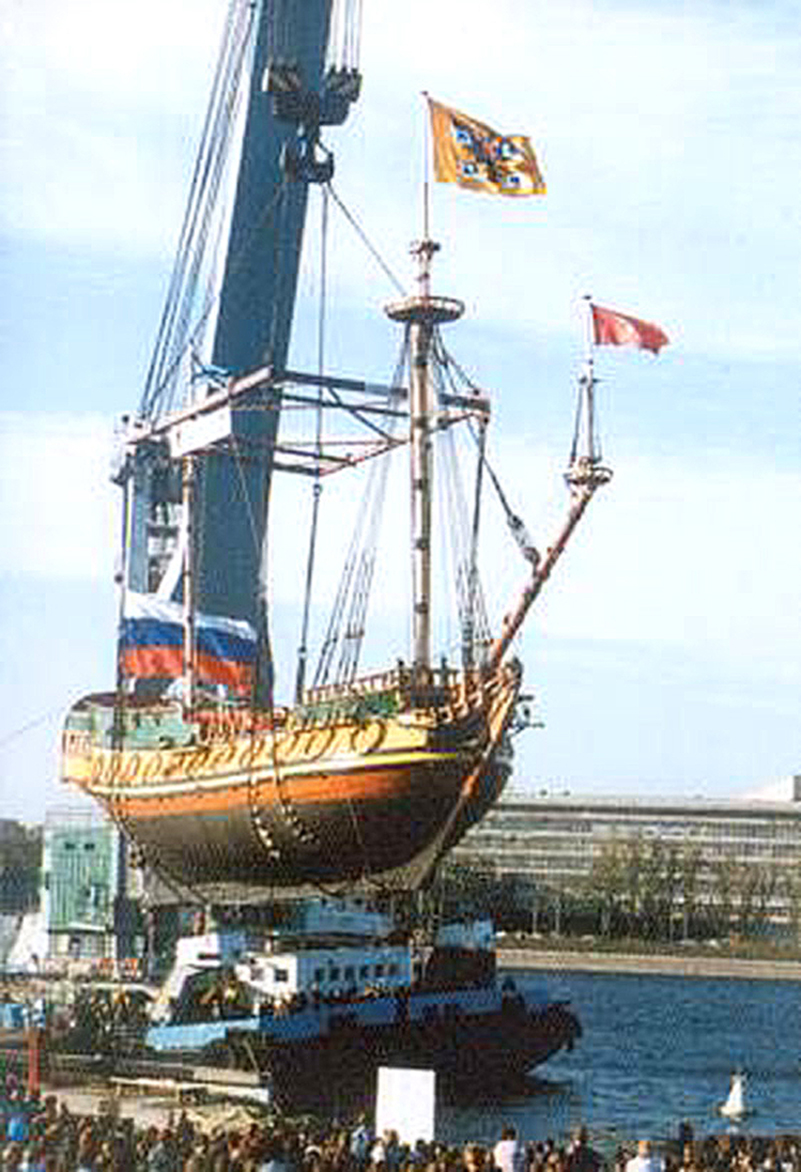
the Shtandart is stately put into the water

And so it happened: on Saturday, September 4, 1999, the Shtandart hoisted the cross, along with the flags of the Imperial Family, the city of Saint Petersburg and the Russian Federation.

==== Finishing afloat ====
The ship was now afloat, but there was still more than a year to work on installing and commissioning all the technology, engines, tanks, etc.

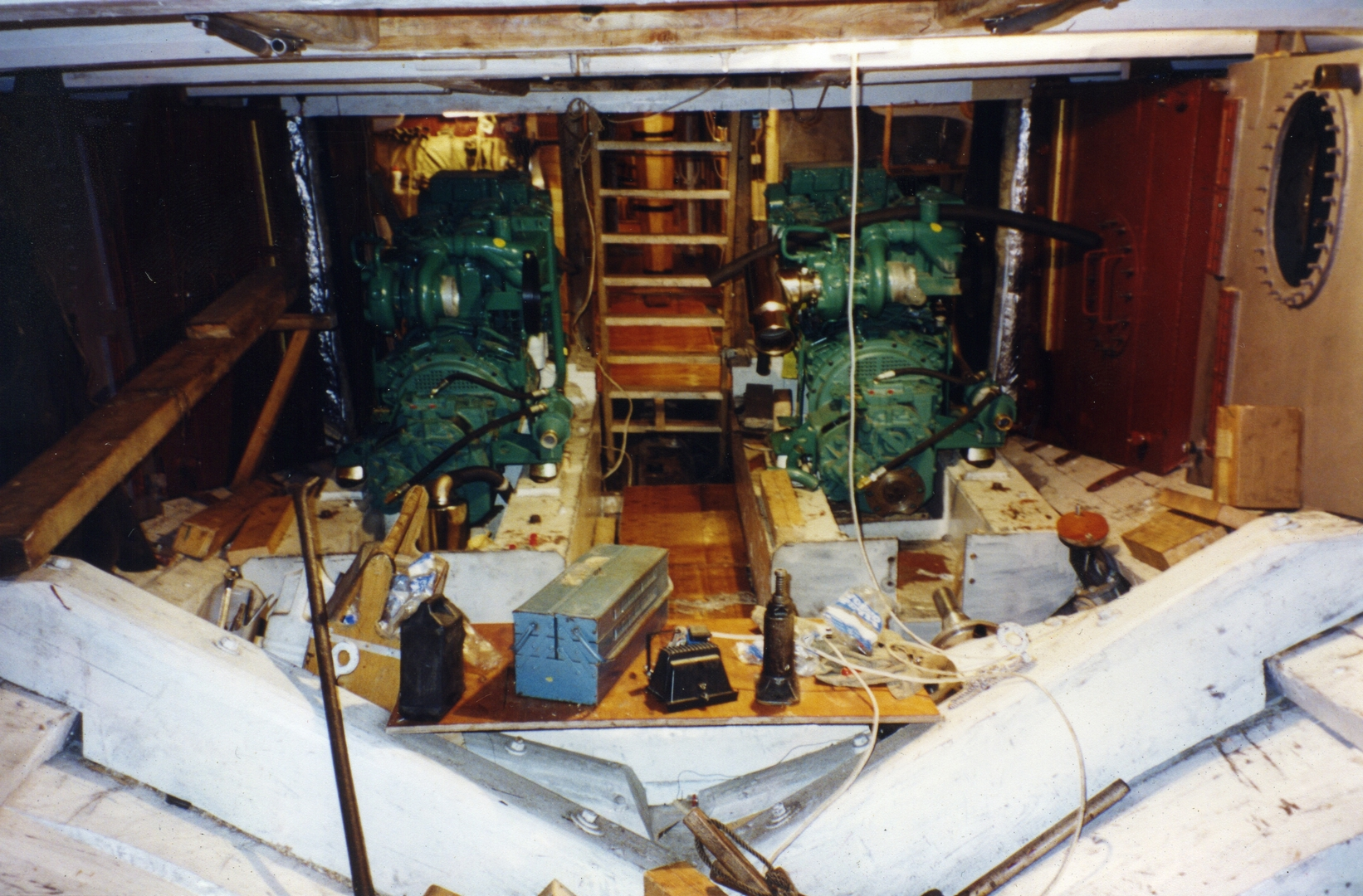
the two Diesel engines in the stern

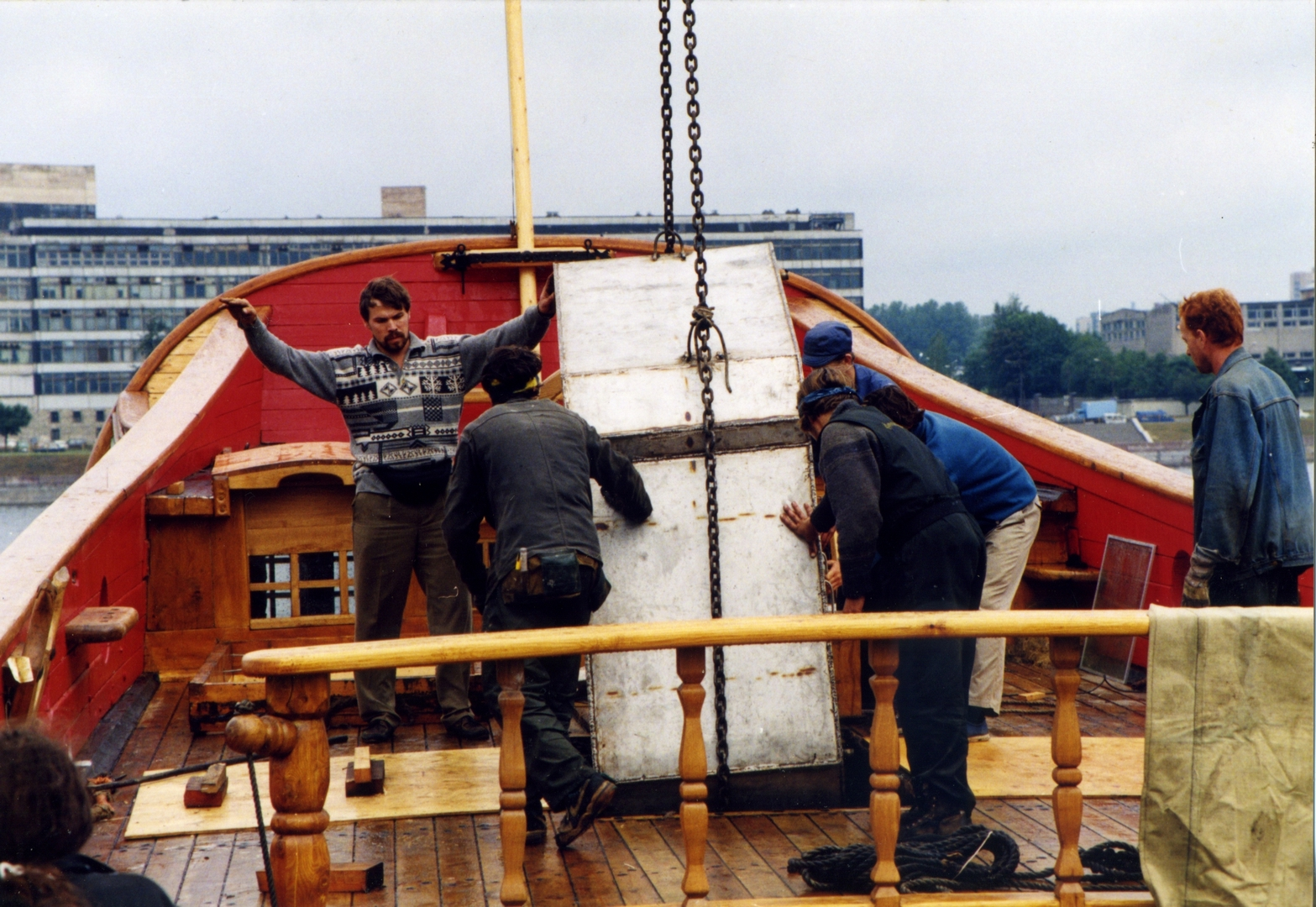
The fuel tank must also be placed

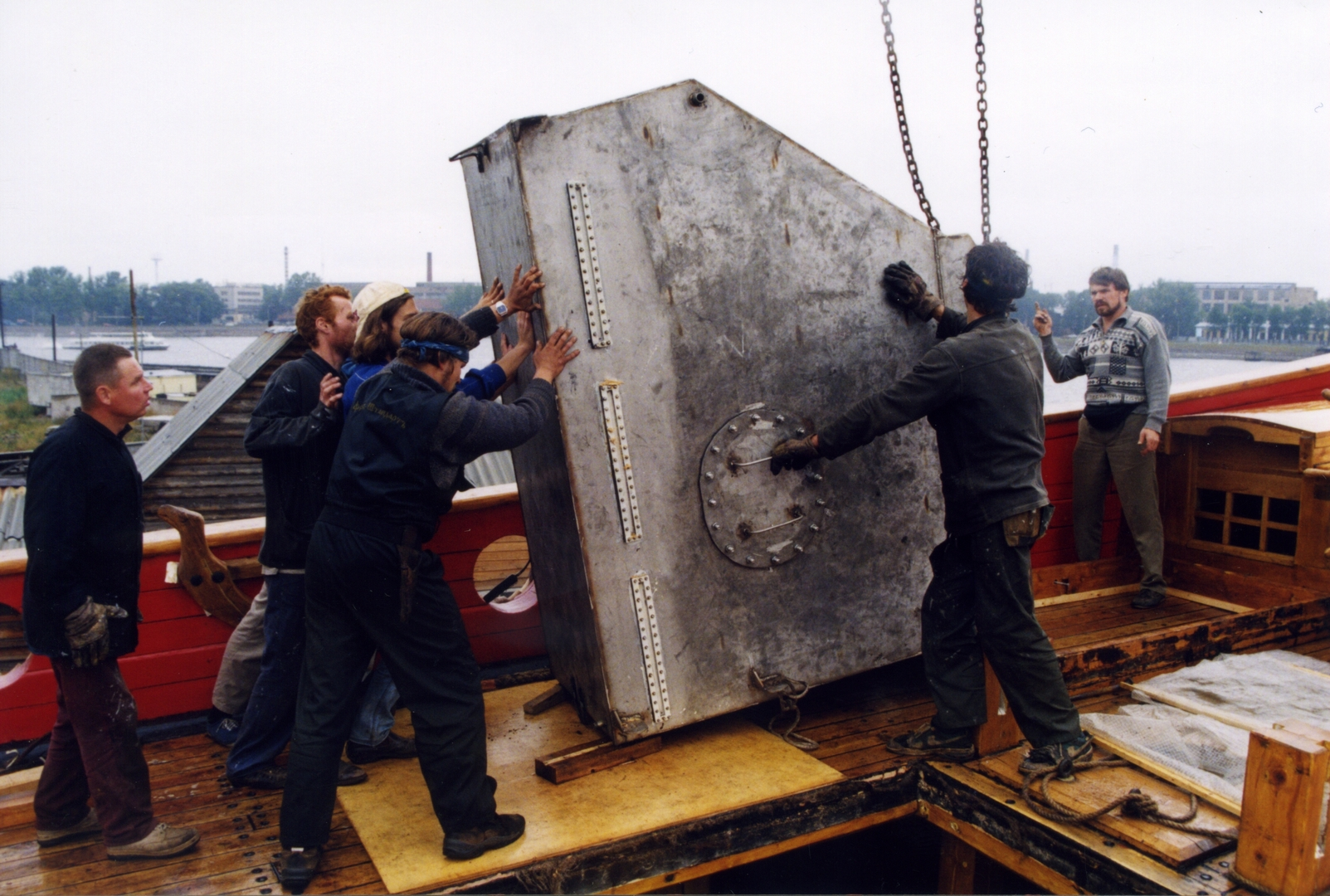
Just like the water tank, which also needs a place below deck...

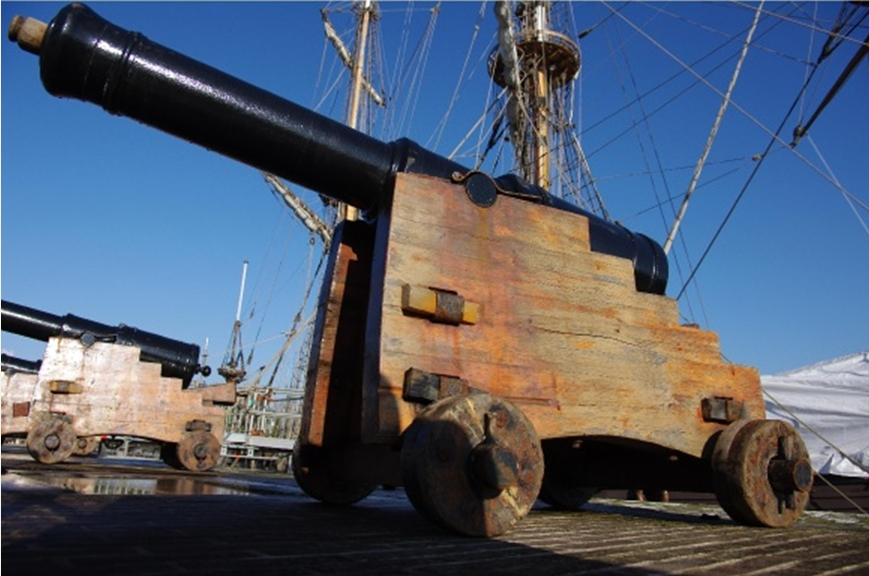
2 (or 3) of the cannons on their carriages

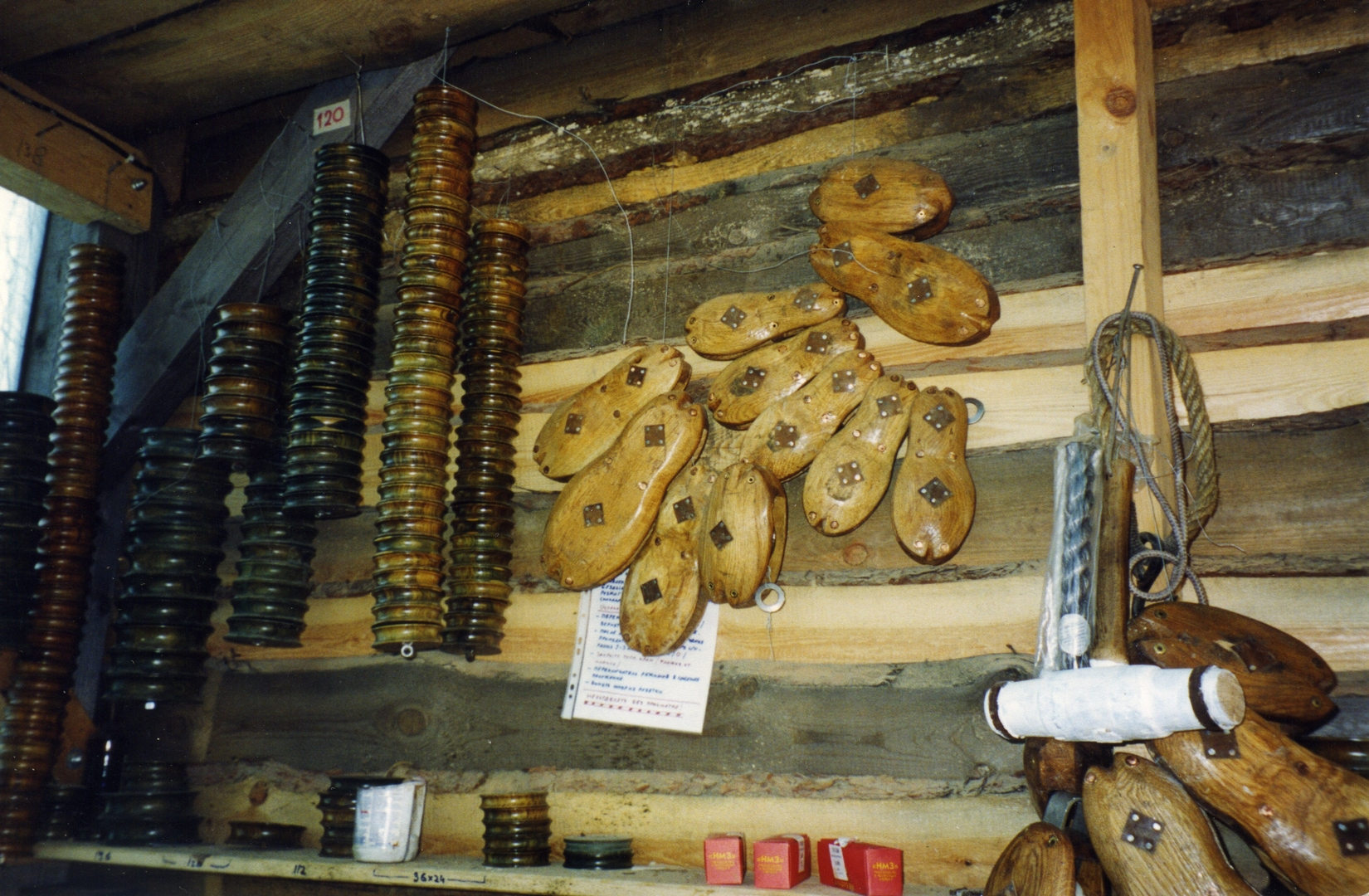
The spare blocks in many sizes and shapes, the sheaves and grommets, everything ready..

=== 2000 ===
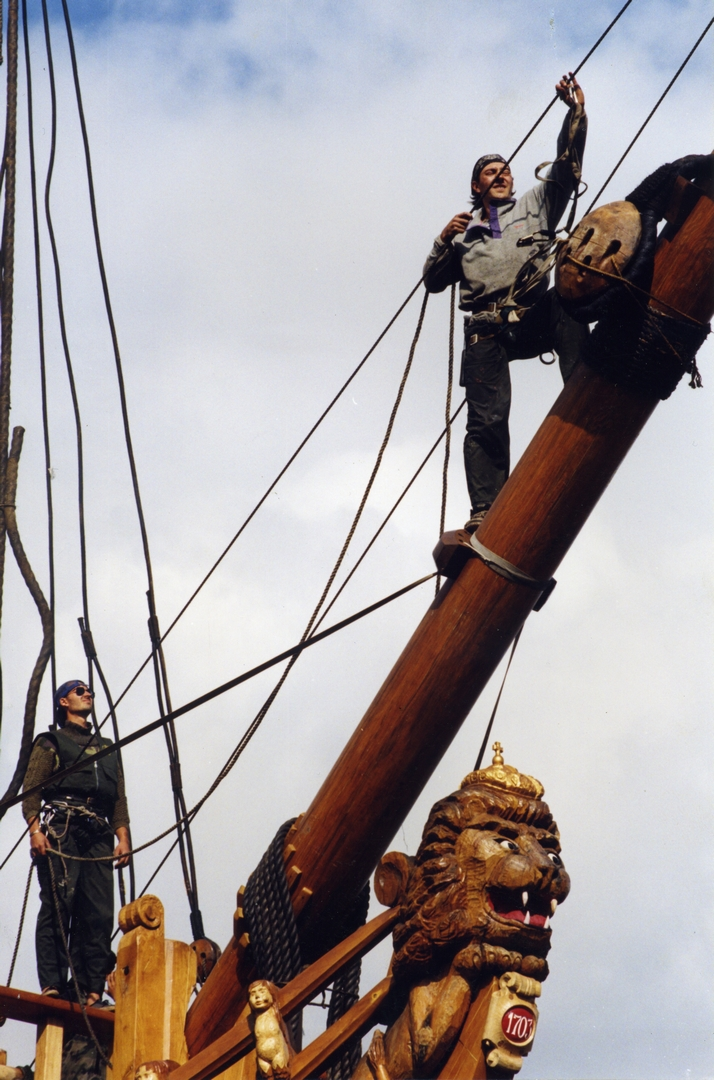
Rigging of the bowsprit

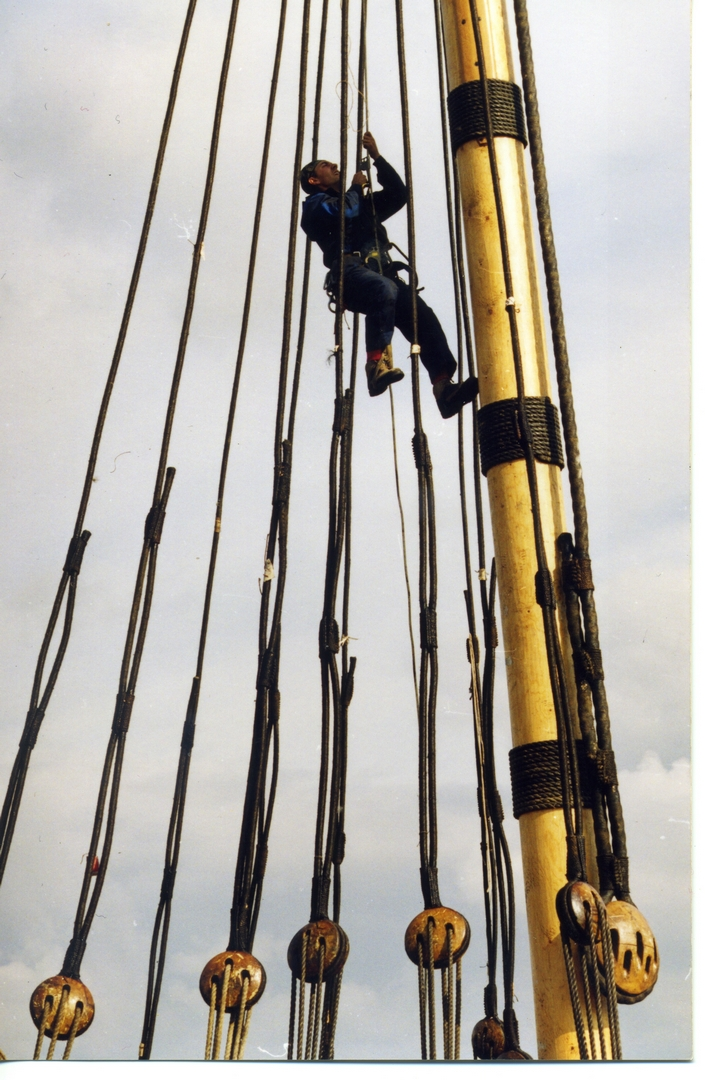
the rigging of the foremast is being prepared

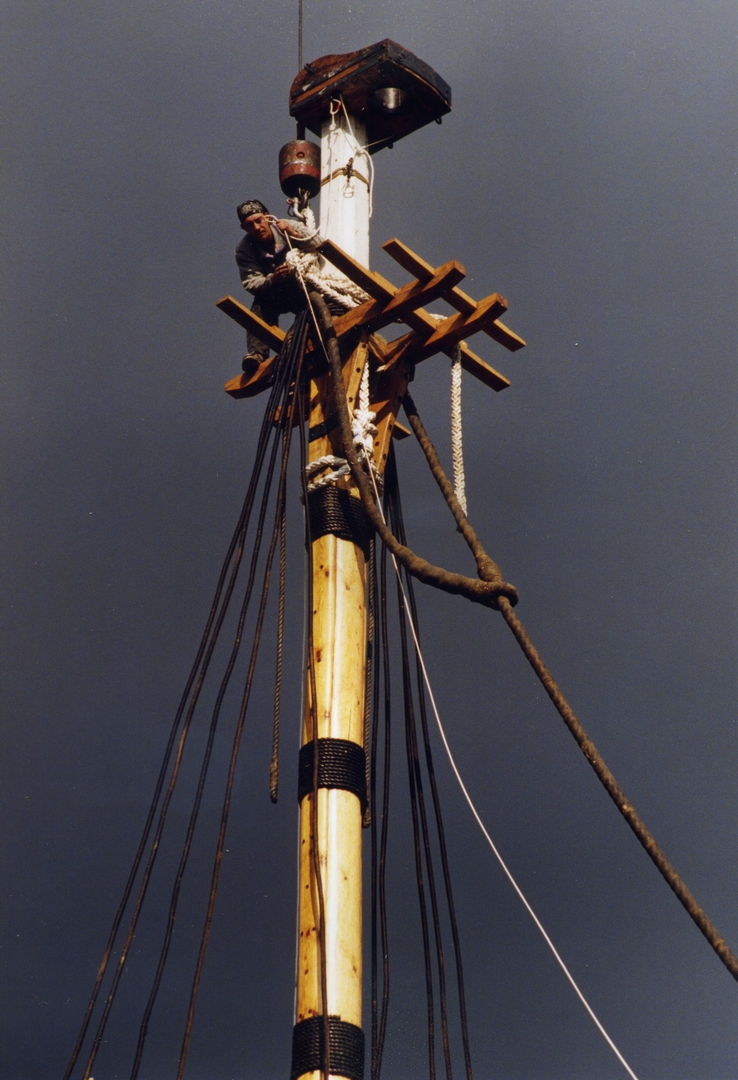
Main-Mizzen with crosstrees, donkey's head and forestay

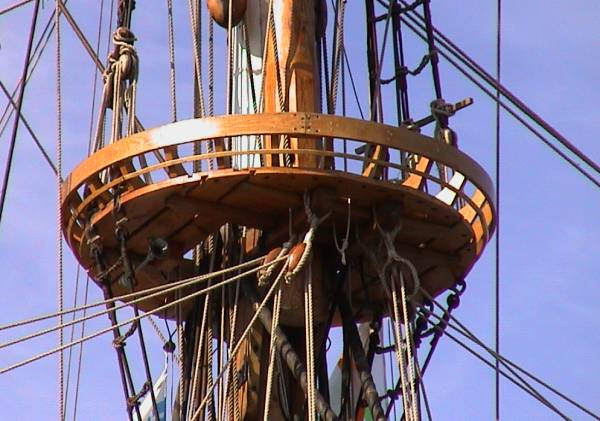
MainTop and lots of rigging
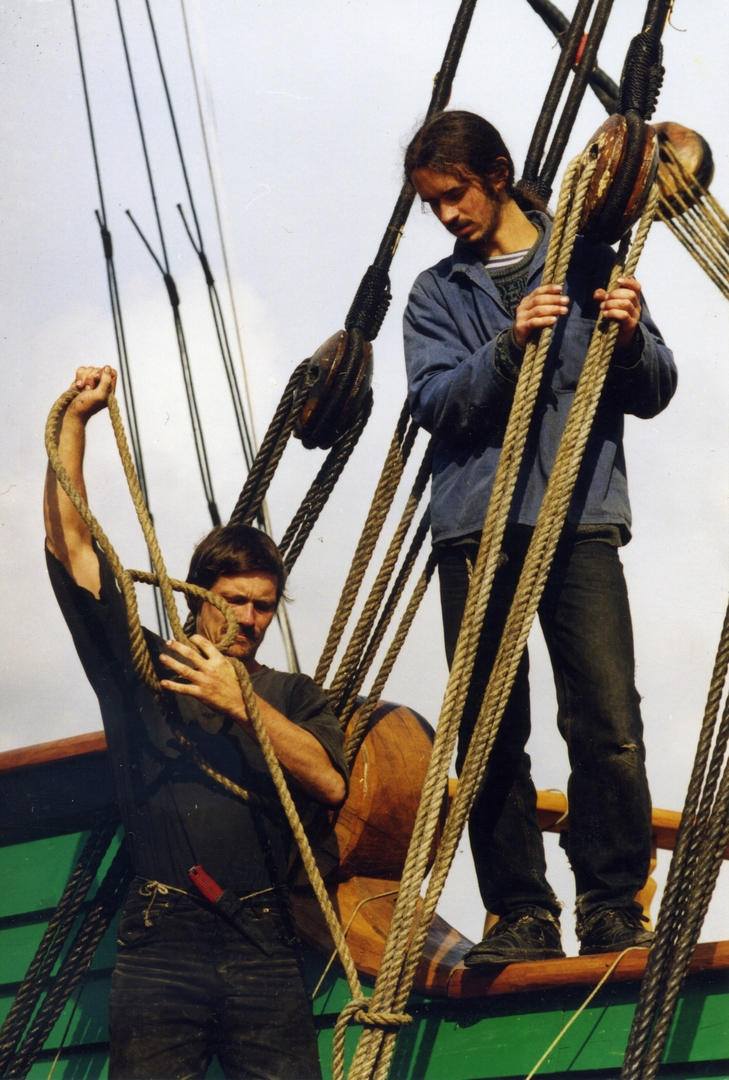
Preparing the Mizzen, the rigging

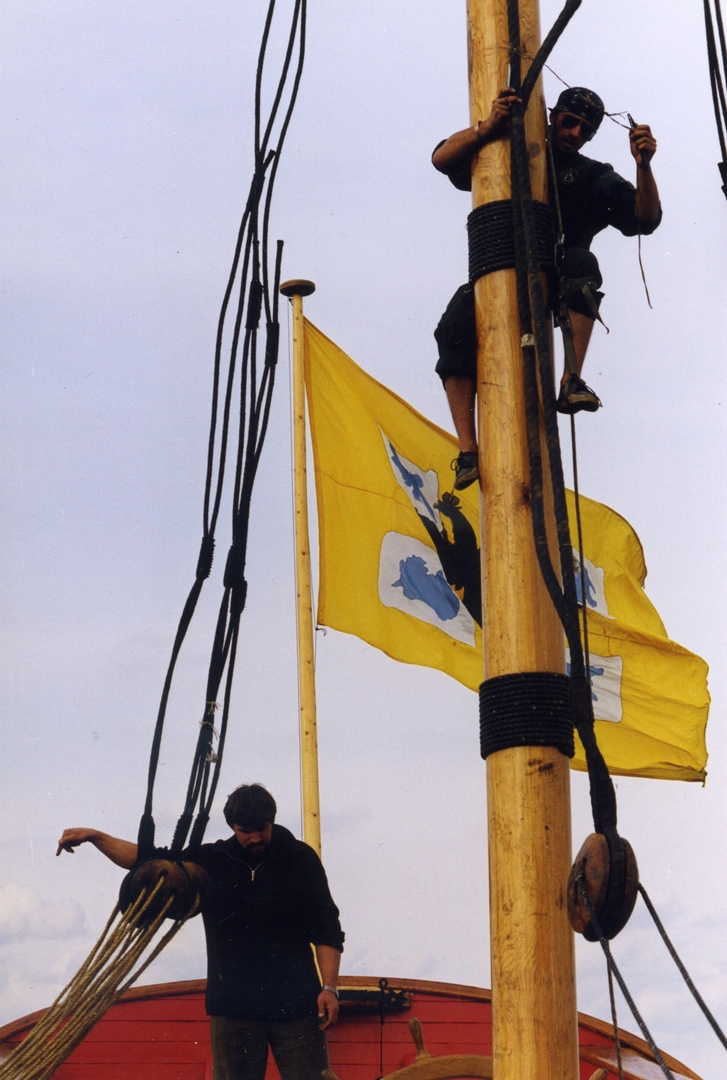
using a mans' lift with the rigging and back-stay

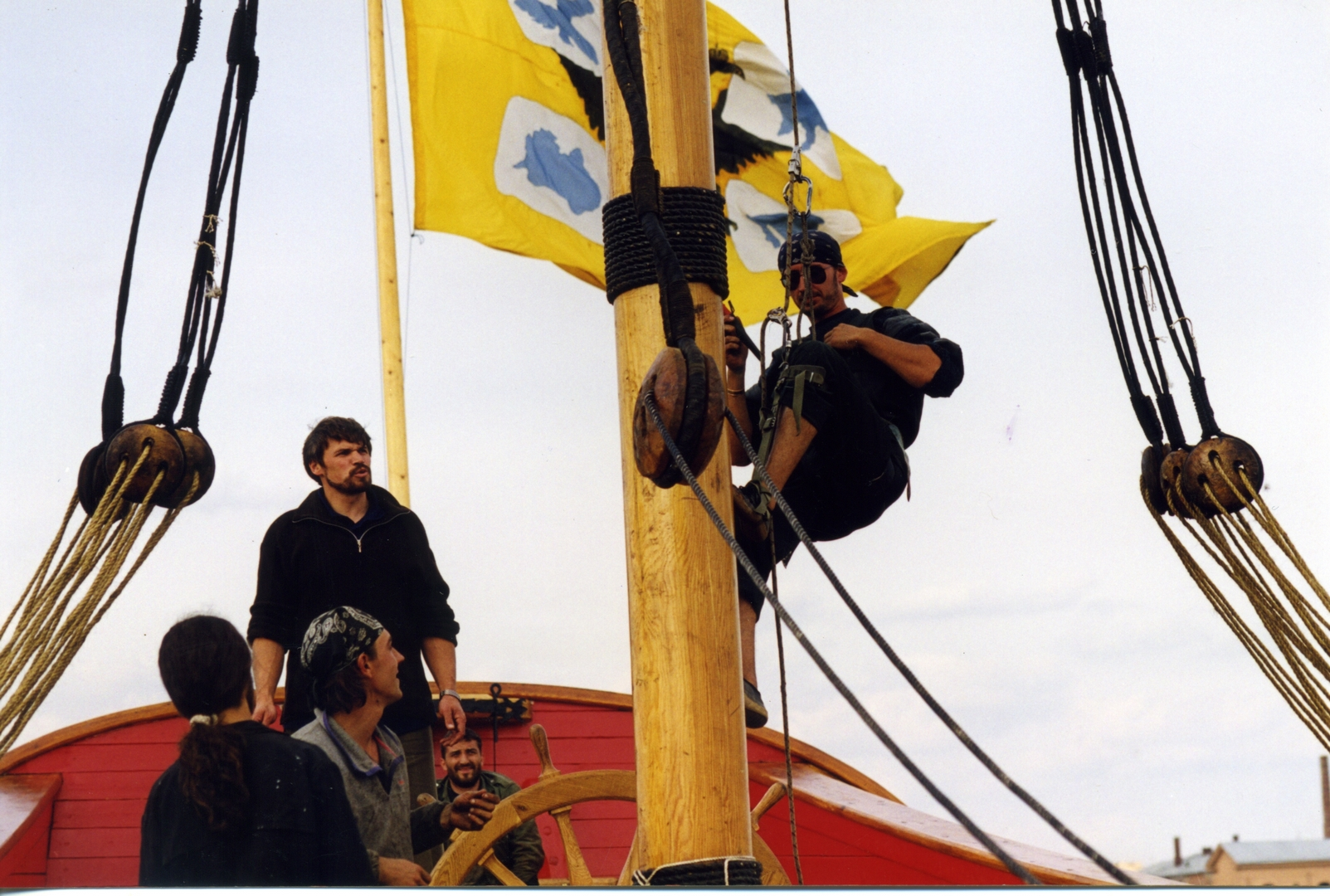
Preparing the mizzen standing rigging

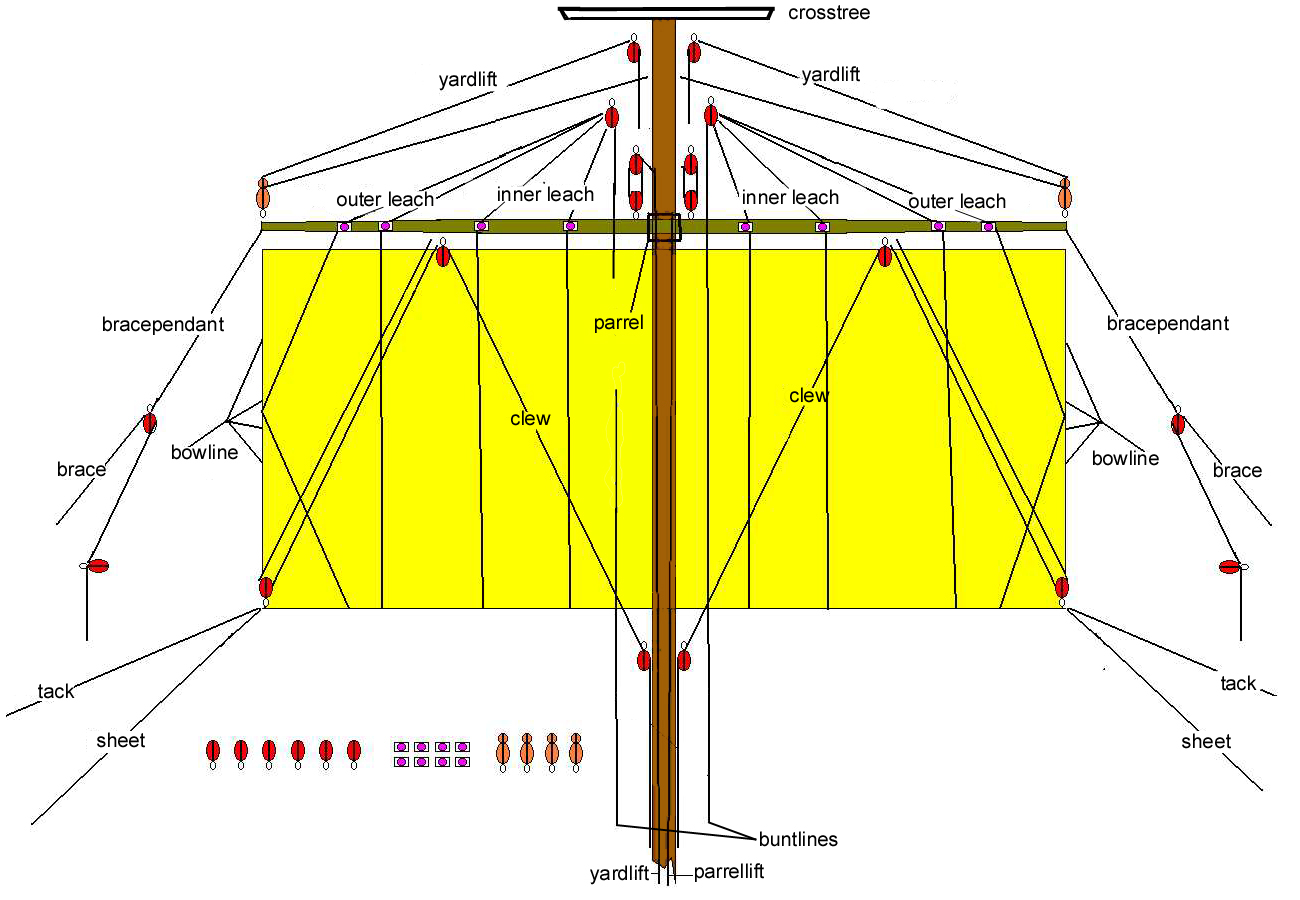
(almost) all lines needed to operate a mainsail of a square rigged ship
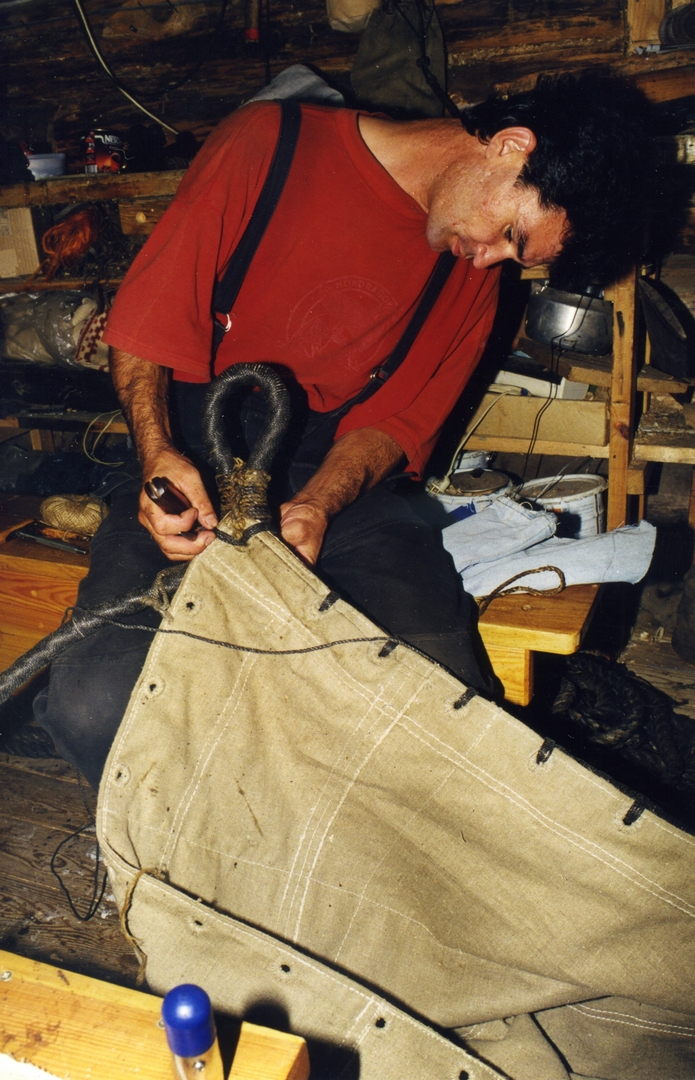
'Schiemanner' does the details: sewing the sail eyes

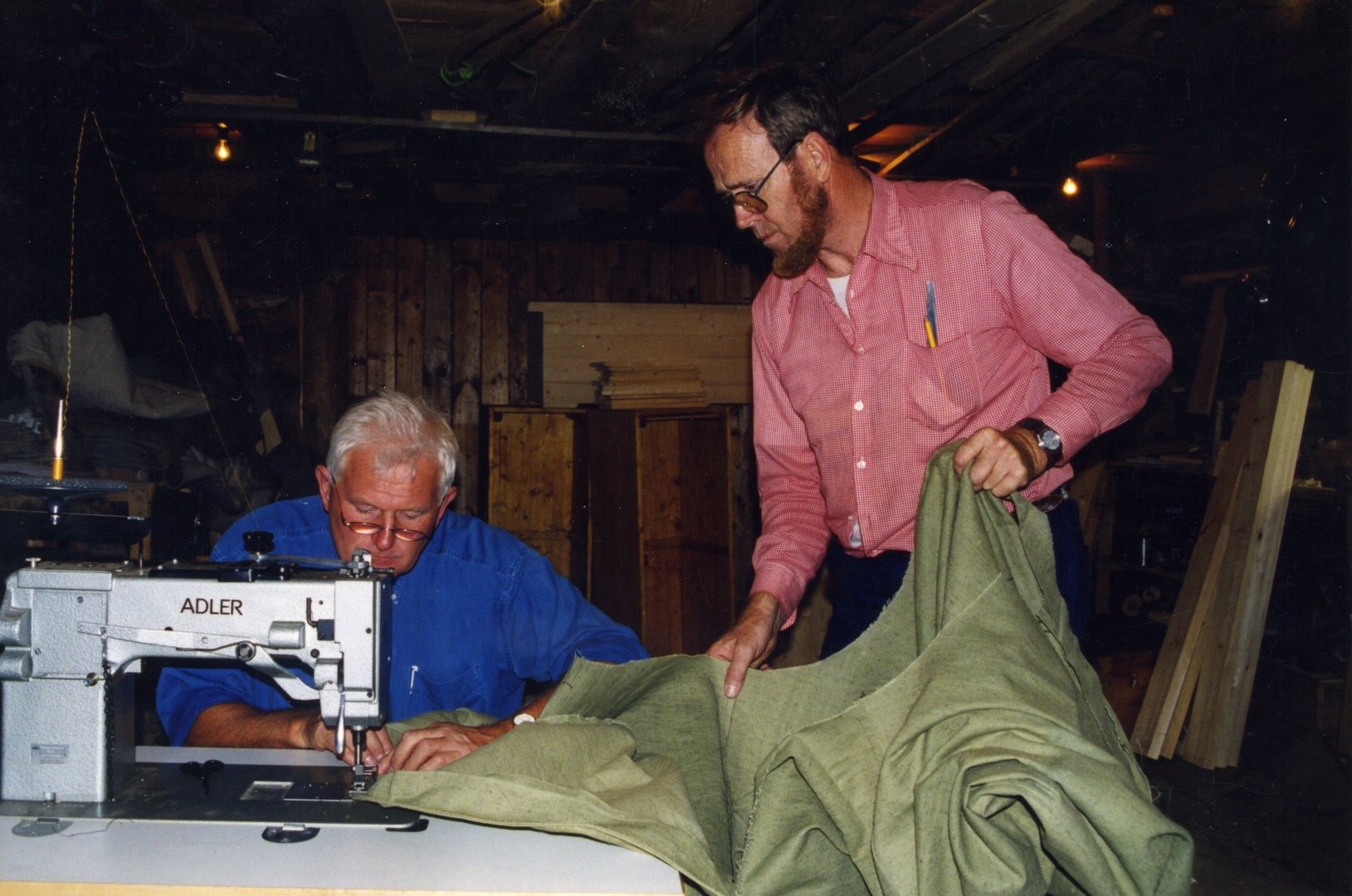
The Dutch sailmaker Henk de Boer at work, assisted by his "Schieman"

==== Start 'Maiden Trip' ====
The original Shtandart had a crew of 150 in wartime. For the replica, the permanent crew is 12 people. Volunteers who want to learn the "trade" supplement the crew.

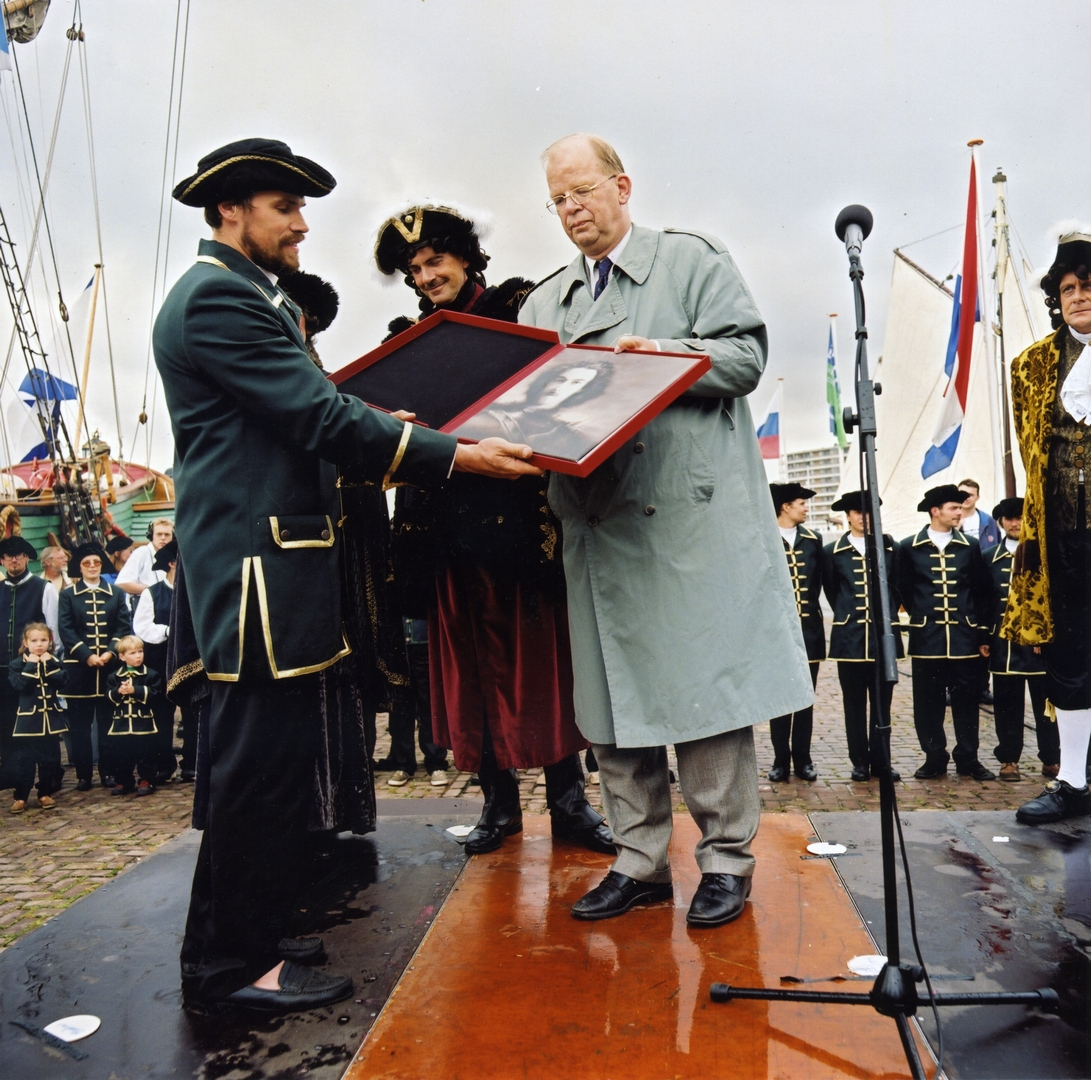
Mayor R. Vreeman of Zaandam presents the portrait of Peter the Great on 5 July.

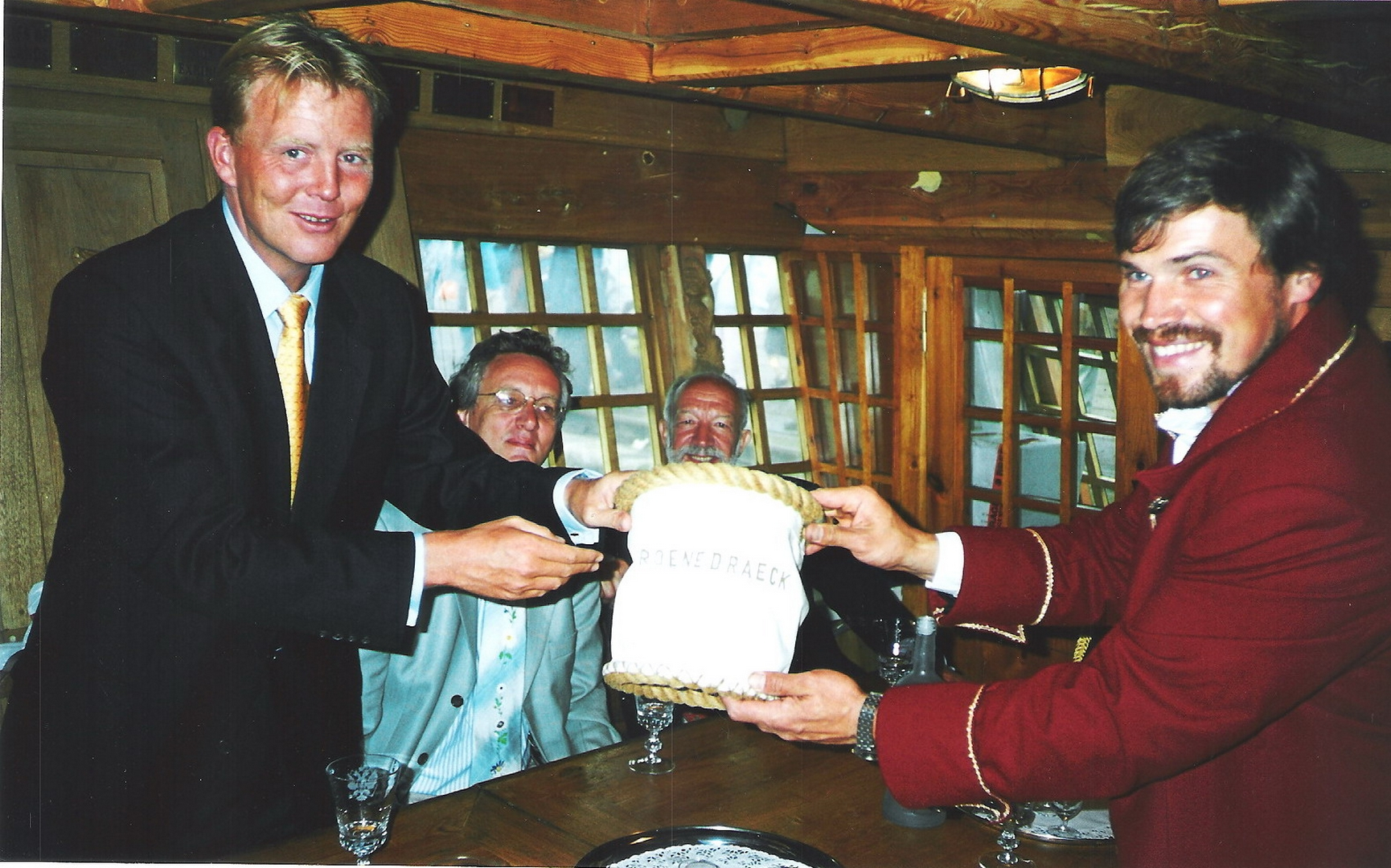
Prince Willem Alexander offers a waterbucket from the Royal Yacht "De Groene Draeck" Two senior officials watch.

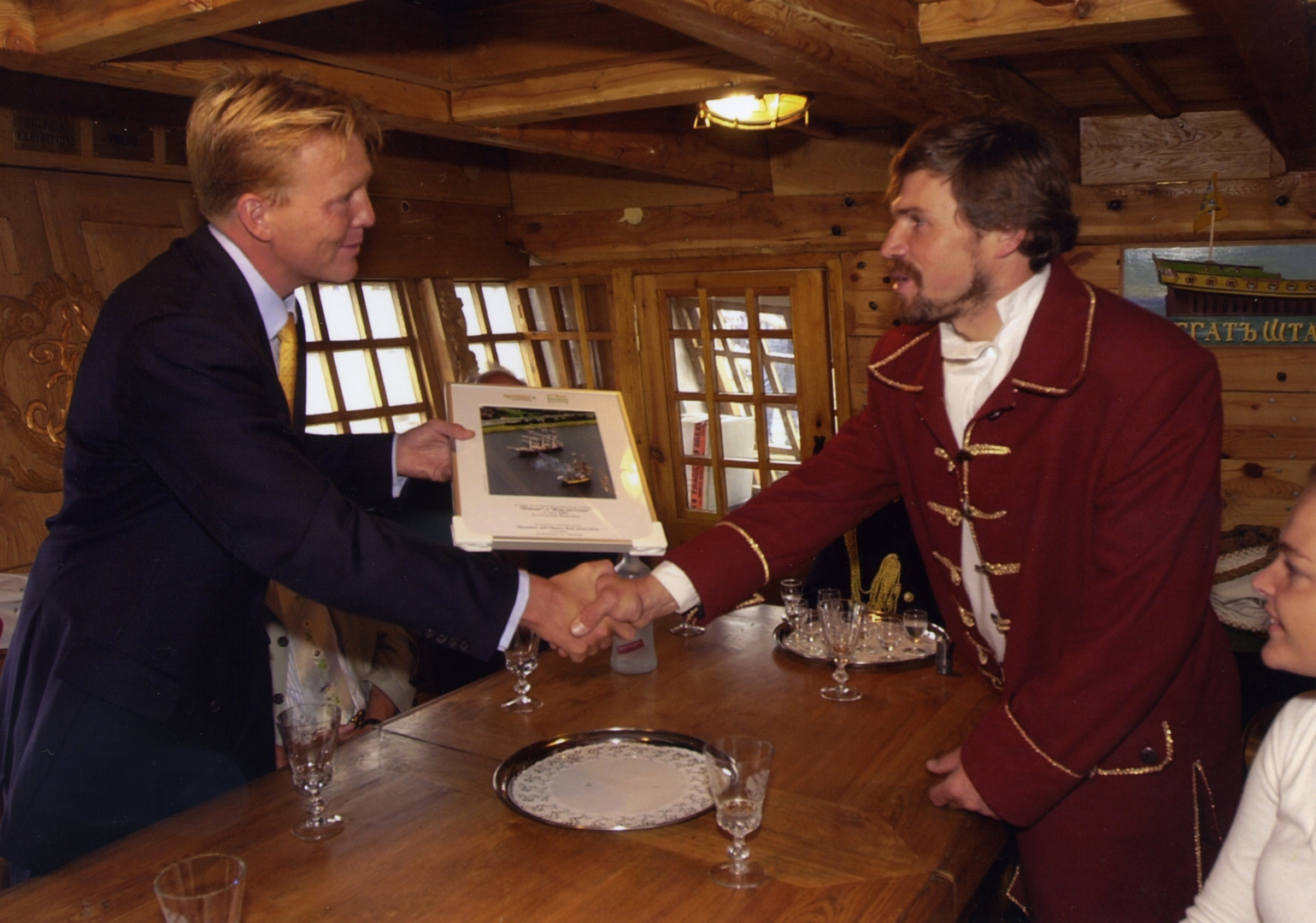
Prince Willem Alexander presents a photo of "city of Amsterdam" and the Shtandart, which fired a salute on the North Sea Canal on July 5 before Sail 2000

=== 2010s ===
In the more than 20 years of the "new" Shtandart's existence, the voyages cover all of western Europe, from beyond the North Cape to Kirkenes in 2009, to the Canary Islands (winter 2013-14) and from Cyprus (Nov 2021) to Belfast (2017).

- Over those twenty years (till 2020) the Shtandart has sailed approximately 210,000 nautical miles (390,000 km) in the Baltic, North, Norwegian Barents and Mediterranean Seas, as well as sailing to Canary Islands. She has visited one hundred and seventy five ports in nineteen countries. Around 9000 trainees has been on board Shtandart for sailing adventure and training.
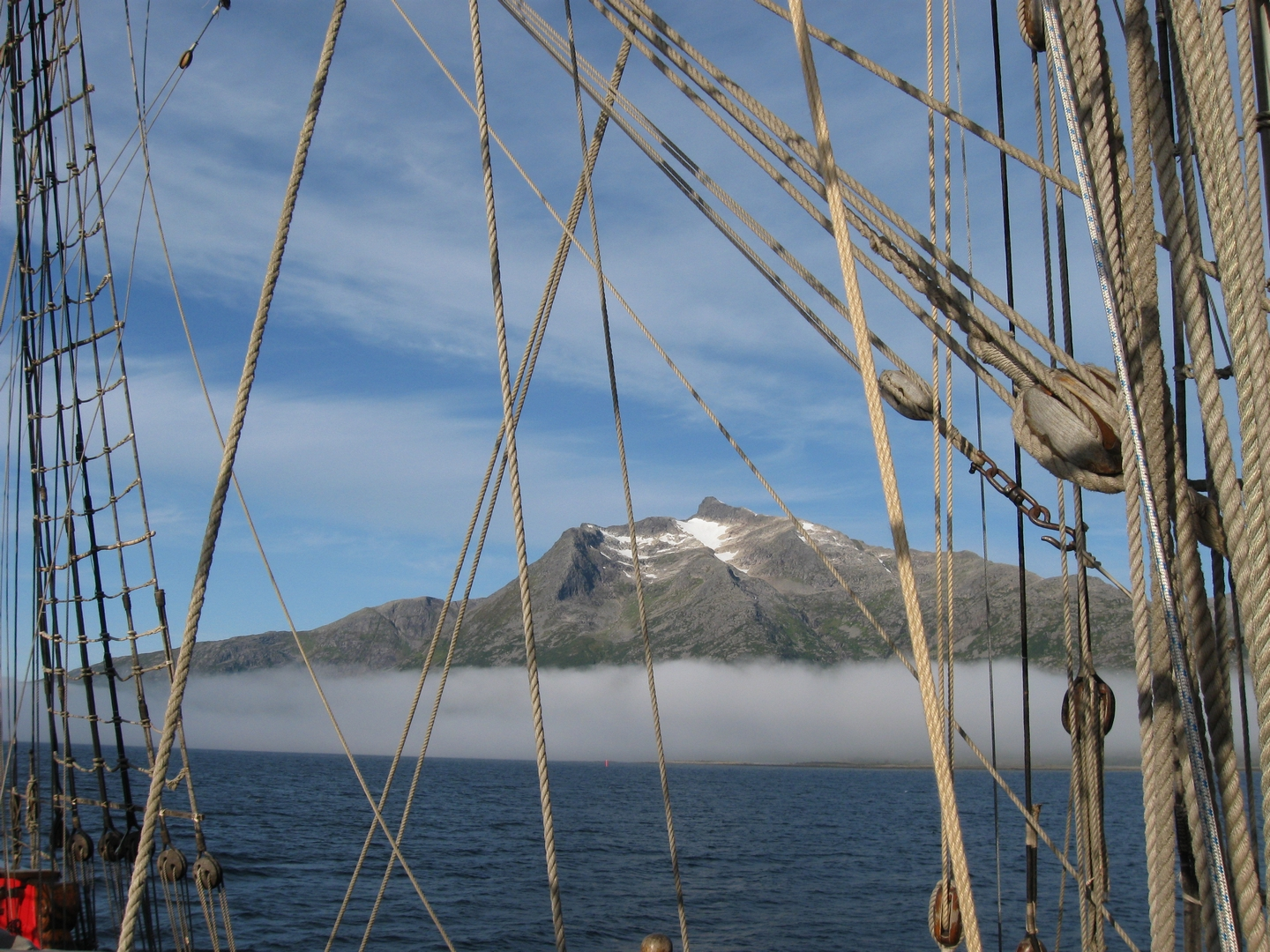
Snow on the peaks at the North Cape-Norway on Aug 26, 2009

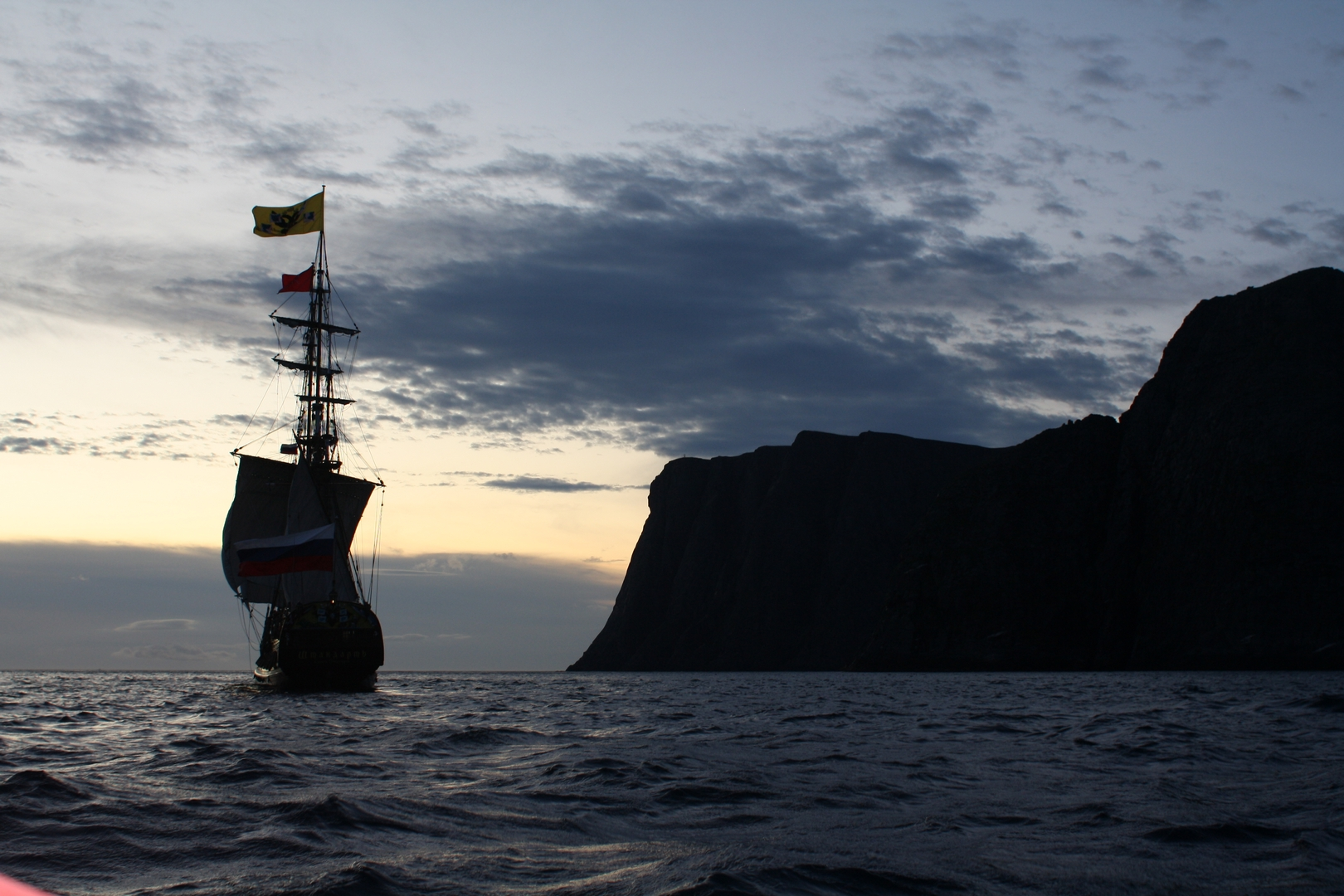
At low sun, the cape is rounded on August 31, 2009 (photo from the sloop!)

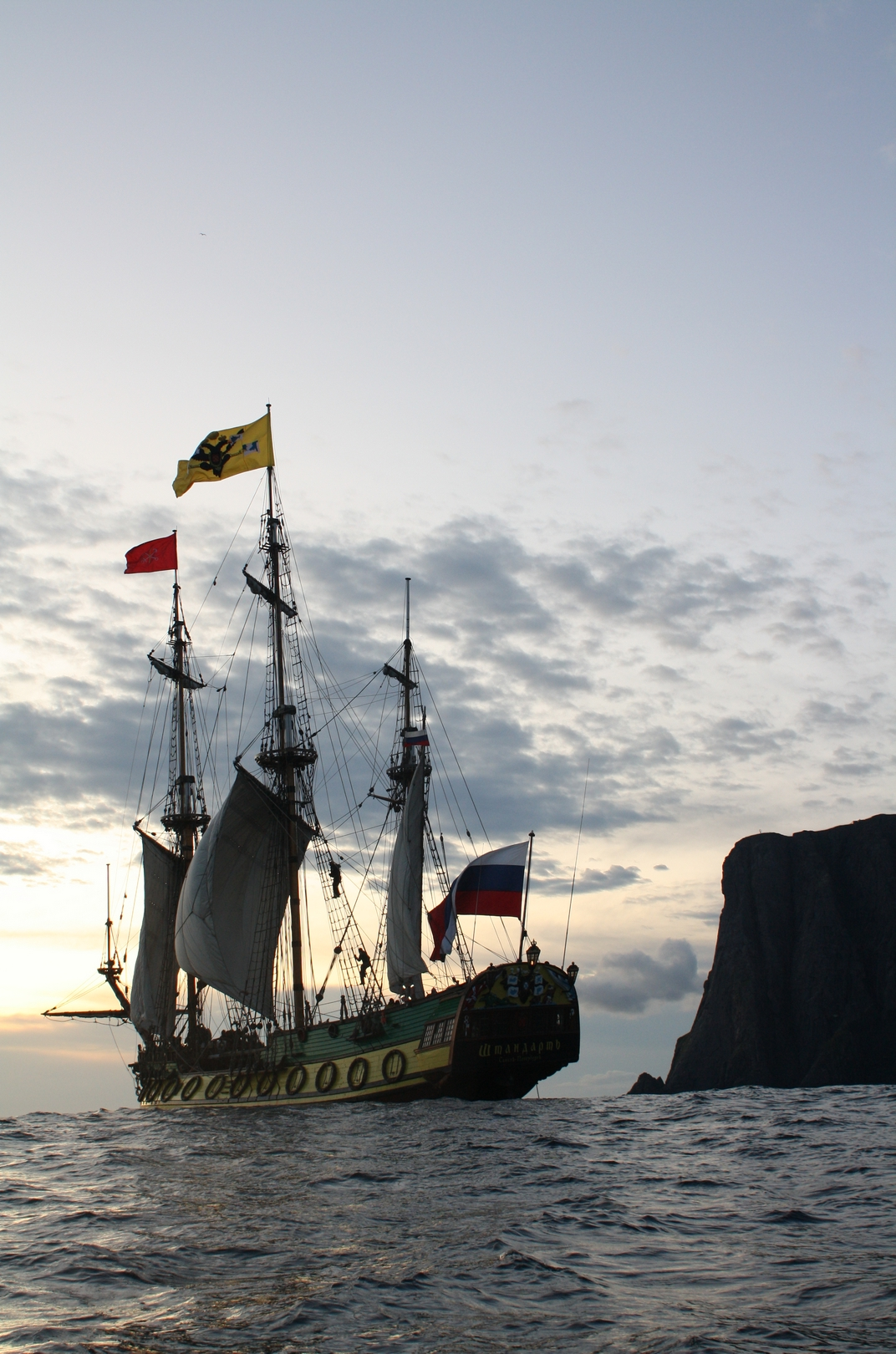
When the sun is low, the cape is rounded on August 31 (photo from the sloop!)

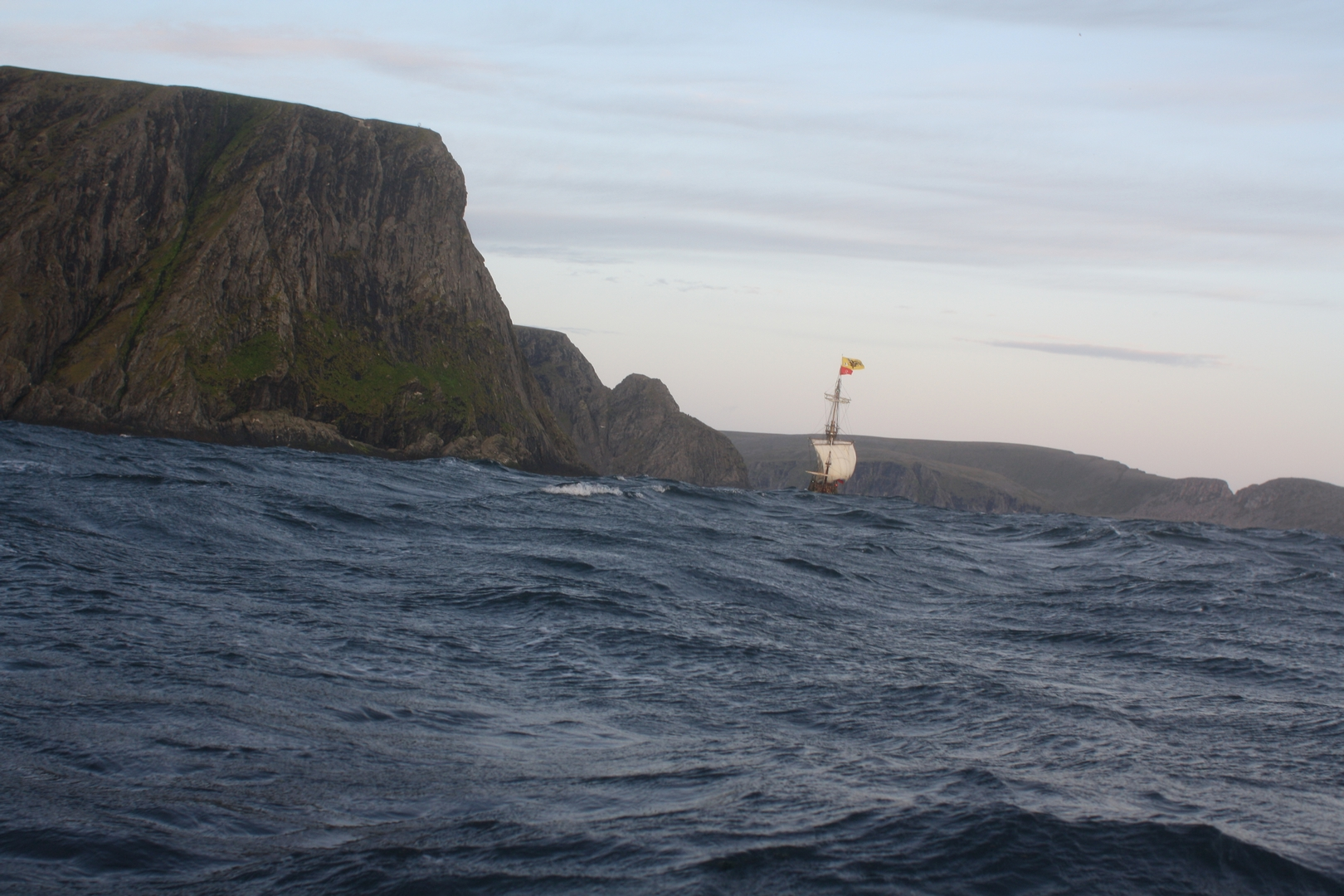
On the way to Kirkeness (photo from the sloop!)

The total overhaul was done in a small Portuguese port Vila do Conde in the winter of 2016-2017

=== 2020s ===
The Shtandart has been unable to return to its home port, Saint Petersburg, because of a dispute with port authorities. The international crew and its Russian-Ukrainian captain Martus do not support the 2022 Russian invasion of Ukraine, further deepening the ship’s alienation from its home port. As a result of sanctions against Russia, Russian ships are denied entry to European ports. However, after an application submitted by Président des Amis des Grands Voiliers association to the French Secretary of the State, the Shtandart received permission to enter French and Spanish ports. The ship was forbidden to attend Brest's Fêtes Maritime in 2024 and many other events because of the sanctions. The Shtandart changed its registration and flag to the Cook Islands in 2024, and the crew is petitioning the EU to be exempted from the sanctions.

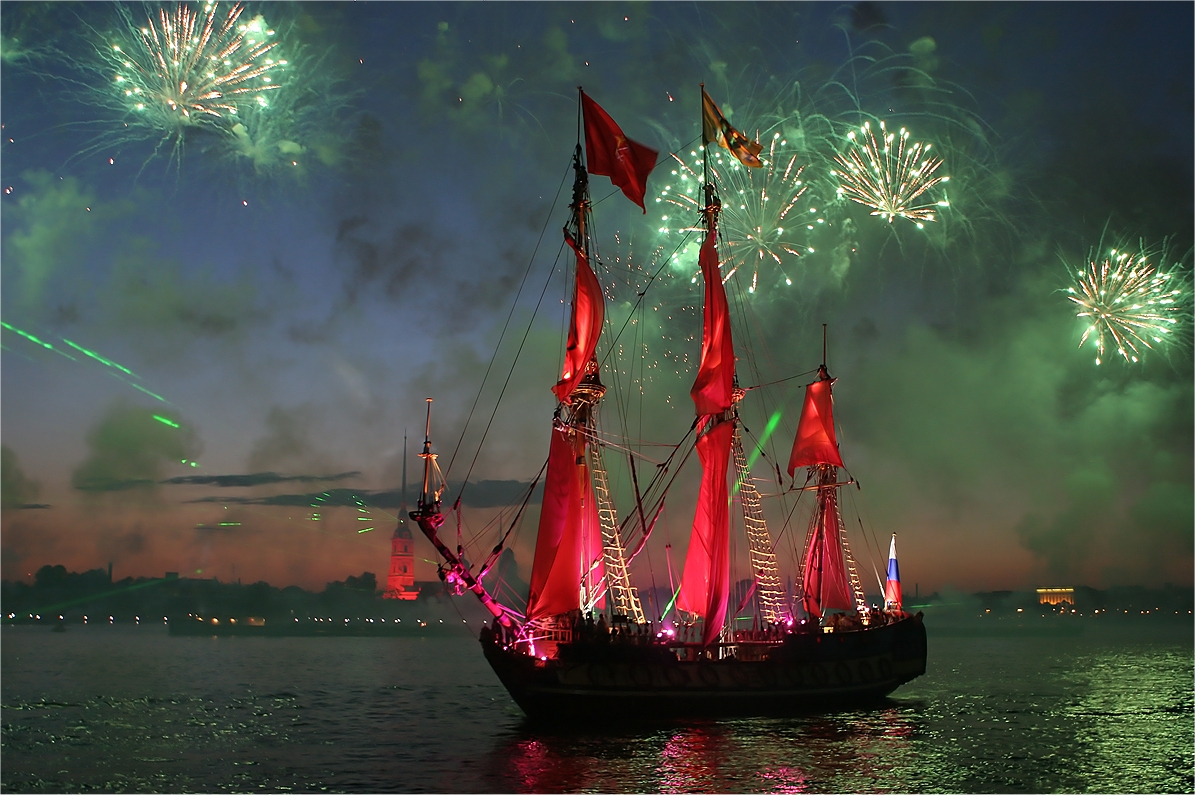
Shtandart playing a key role of Scarlet Sails holiday of alumnus, 2007

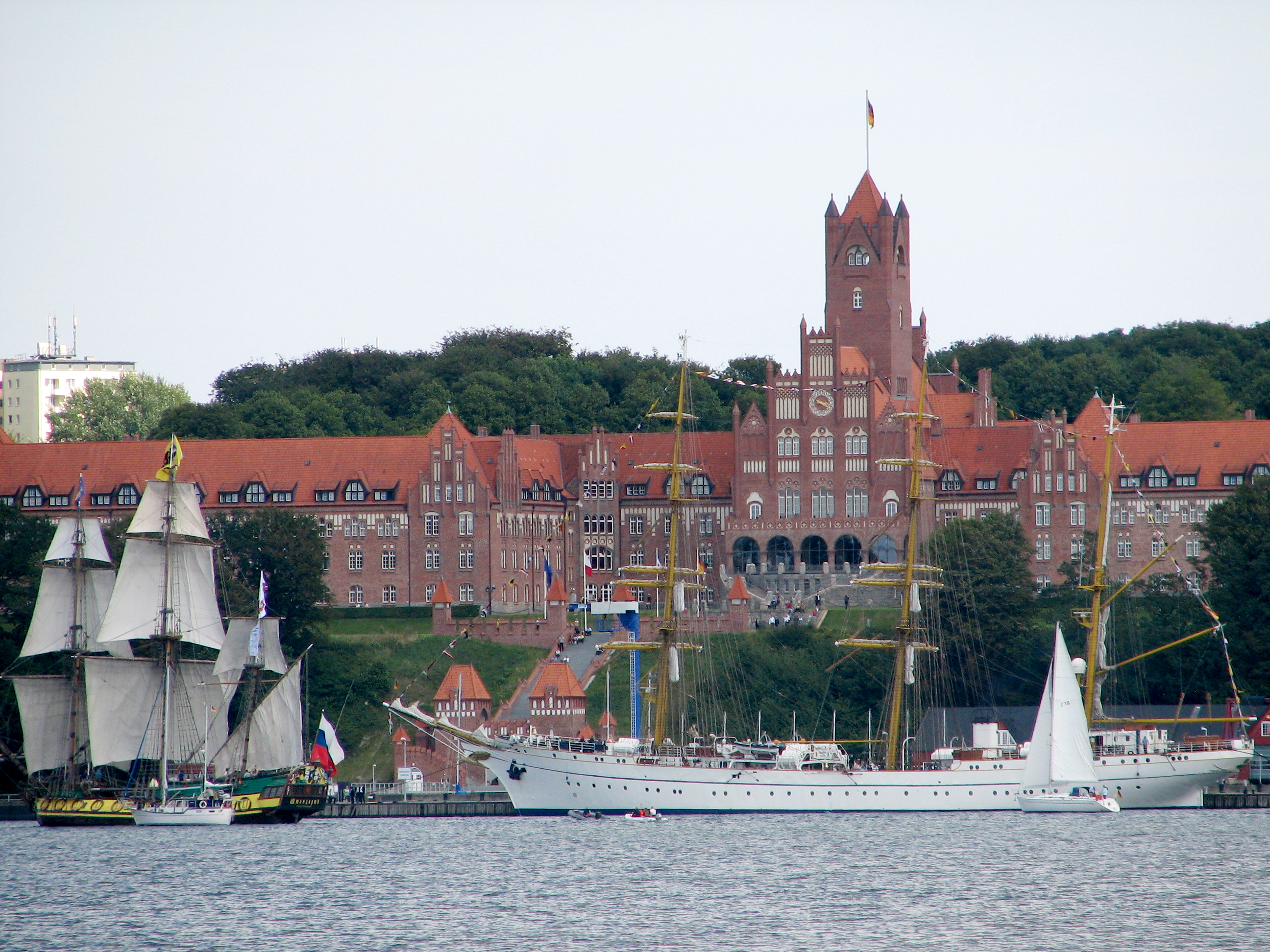
The Shtandart with the Gorch Fock in front of the Naval Academy Mürwik (2010)

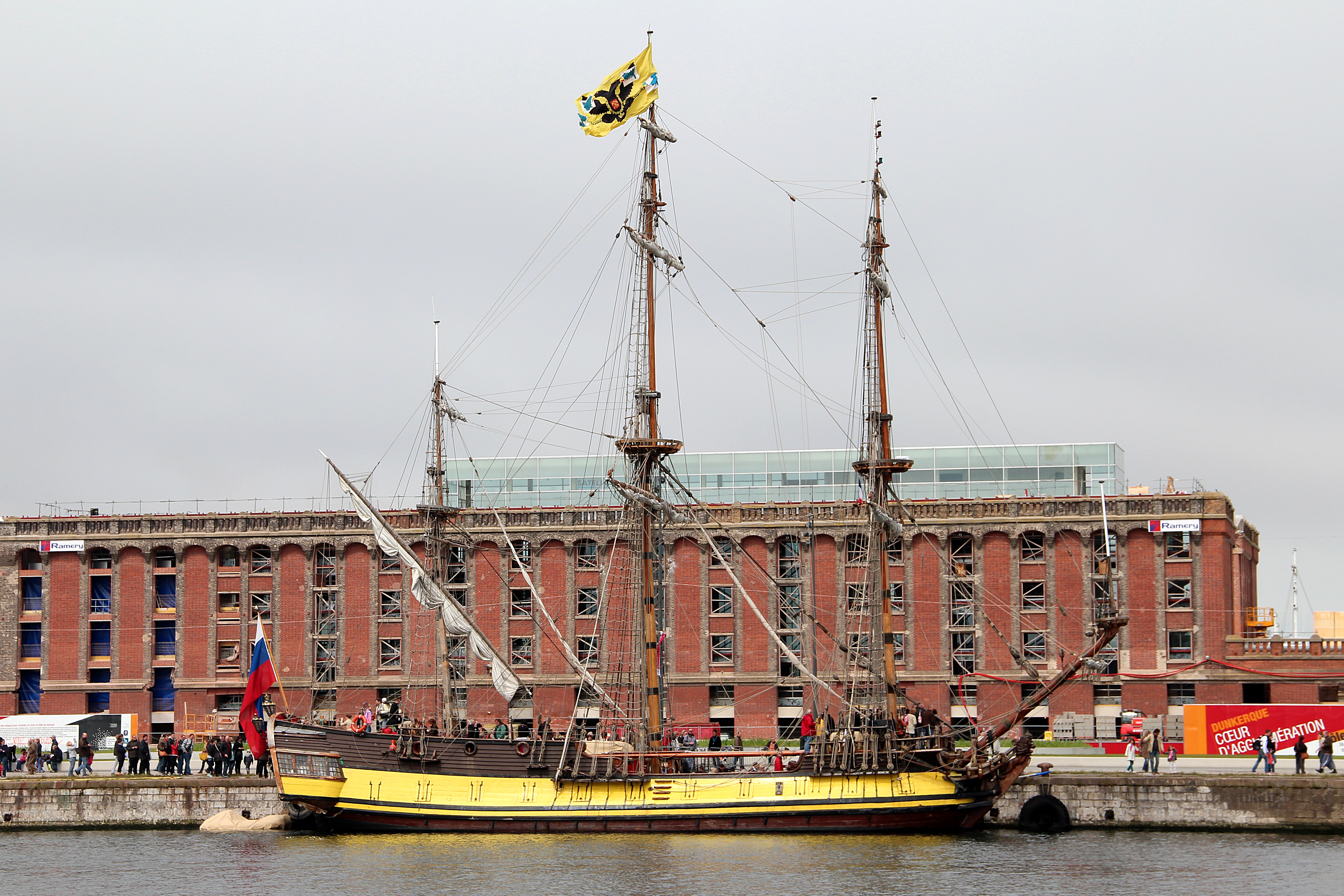
During the large maritime gathering in Dunkirk (2013).

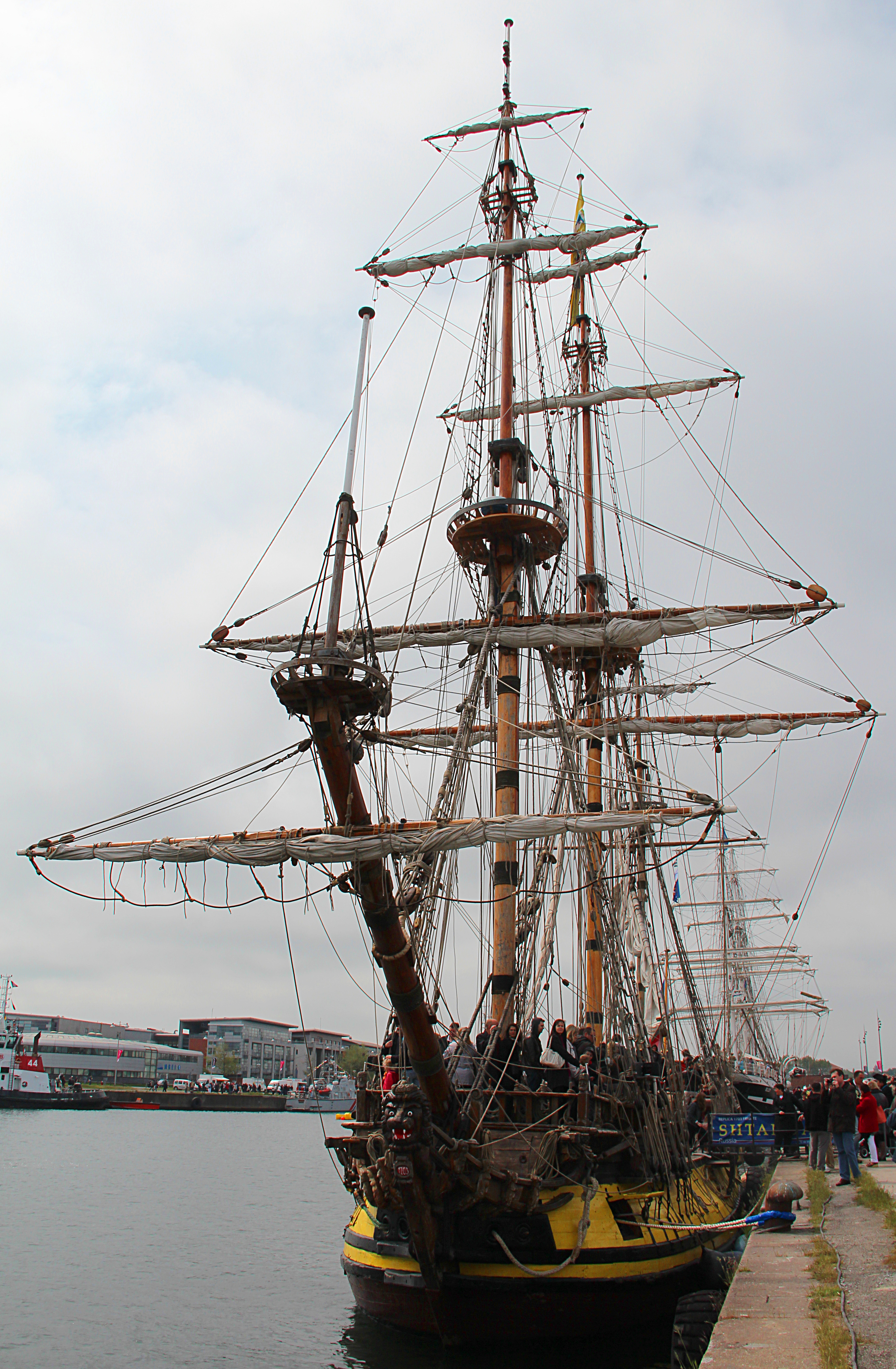
Bow of the Shtandart.

== Milestones of the Shtandart ==
- On September 4, 1999, the Shtandart was launched at the Petrovsky Shipyard in St Petersburg.
- On 25 June 2000 the Shtandart set sail on her maiden voyage, where frigate visited the same harbours and places as Peter I, during his Grand Embassy.
- In 2005–2009, the Shtandart has played the part of the "dream ship" at the Scarlet Sails festival, an annual celebration of the end of the school year in St. Petersburg from a novel by Alexander Grin
- In 2010-2020, the Shtandart has sailed in different European ports as a school-ship. Main mission was to develop a friendship and mutual understanding between people of all nations.
- In 2020-2022, despite health limitations in Europe, the Shtandart continued her sail-training activity.

== Classification of the ship ==
From 2007, sailing vessels in Russia faced challenges with a classification. The new National Sea and River Authority (then Росморречнадзор/Rosmorrechnadzor, now Госморречнадзор/Gosmorrechnadzor) refused to issue classification certificates for sailing ships. The Shtandart was one of the most prominent of these vessels, so her dispute with this government agency was widely publicized. In 2020, after publishing new rules for Sport sailing vessels, the Russian Maritime register of shipping has classified the Shtandart as "sail-training vessel, traditional built" for voyages in the area 2 (200 miles from nearest port).

== Shtandart activities in 2000–2021 ==
- June 25, 2000 - the Shtandart has left St Petersburg port for her maiden voyage
- Season 2000 route: St Petersburg — Vysby — Zaandam — Ijmuiden — Dunkirk — Roskoff — Brest for Brest 2000 — London — Amsterdam — Bremerhaven Sail Bremerhaven — St Malo
- season 2005 route: St Petersburg — Copenhagen — Odense — Halmstad — Helsinki — St Petersburg — Baltiisk— Lelystad — Rochester — London — Lowestoft — Hartlepool — Newcastle — Frederikstad (TSR) — Bremerhaven — Helgoland — Wismar — Travemünde — Frederikshavn — Göteborg — Szczecin — Kotka — St Petersburg
- On August 25, 2009, the Shtandart sailed from St Petersburg all way around Norway's North Cape.
- During the winter of 2009–2010, the ship remained in Oslo, Norway, for winter quarters.
- season 2010 route: Norway — Poland — Germany — Finland — Belgium (TSR ports) — Denmark — Norway — Germany — Netherlands
- season 2015 route: Hamburg — Flensburg — Stockholm — Riga — Klaipeda — Szczecin — Sandefjord — Aalesund — Kristiansand — Aalborg — Amsterdam (Sail Amsterdam 2015) — Vlissingen — Poole — Lisbon — Malaga — Cannes — Rome — Genoa — Napoli — Palermo
- season 2016 route: Barcelona — Malaga — Gibraltar — Cascais — Ferrol — Barcelona — Sete — Tarragona — Rochefort — Brest — Swanage — Edinbough — Blyth — Goteborg — Sønderborg — Amsterdam — Plymouth — St Malo — Bordeaux — Porto
- season 2017 route: Vila do Conde — Cadis — Malaga — Vigo — Vannes — Dublin — Belfast — Liverpool — Honfleur — Kotka — Turku — Klaipeda — Szczecin — Copenhagen — La Rochelle — Nantes — Honfleur — Amsterdam — Copenhagen — St Malo — La Coruña — Porto — Malaga — Palma de Mallorca — Barcelona
- season 2018 route: Cartagena — Tarragona — Florence — Genoa — Grande-Motte — Tarragona — Sete — Castellon de la Plana — Alicante — Cadiz — Vigo — Saint-Malo — Oostende — Caen — Amsterdam — Szczecin — Aalborg — Copenhagen — Amsterdam — Sunderland — Esbjerg — Stavanger — Aarhus — Copenhagen — Amsterdam — Honfleur — La Rochelle
- season 2019 route: La Rochelle — Santander — La Coruna — Cascais — Malaga — Seville — Vigo — Vannes — Rouen — Scheveningen — Aalborg — Frederikstad — Bergen — Aarhus — Stockholm — Boulogne — Southampton — Dunkirk — Amsterdam — La Rochelle — Lisbon — Malaga — Valencia — Barcelona
- season 2020 route: Barcelona — Naples — Corfu — Valletta — Castellion — Vigo — La Rochelle — Calais — Zaandam
- season 2021 route: La Rochelle - Pasaia - La Rochelle - Saint Malo - Calais - Zaandam - Harlingen - Hamburg - Swinoustje - Riga - Tallinn - Klaipeda - Szczecin - Scheveningen - Oostende - Caen - La Rochelle - Vigo - Cascais - Malaga - Ibiza - Valletta - Athens - Paros - Chios - Lemnos - Rafena - Santorini - Athens - Rhodos - Kos - Rhodos - Limassol - Rhodos - Kos

== Shtandart in films ==
- 2007 : The Sovereign's Servant, a Russian war film written and directed by Oleg Ryaskov.
- 2011 : The Secret Service Agent's Memories, a Russian historical film and TV series based on the novel by Oleg Ryaskov, who is also the director.
- 2011 : Nova Zembla, a Dutch historical drama film directed by Reinout Oerlemans.
- 2015 : Der Schatz des Käpt'n Karotte (Captain Carrot's Treasure), a German film for children.
- 2015 : Michiel de Ruyter, a 2015 Dutch film about the 17th-century admiral Michiel de Ruyter directed by Roel Reiné. On the English promotional website, the film has the title Admiral.
- 2015 : Peter and Wendy, a 2015 adaptation of JM Barrie's Peter Pan, where the frigate Shtandart stood in for Captain Hook's ship, the Sea Devil.
- 2024 : Youtube film explaining results of sanctions: "https://www.youtube.com/watch?v=T1paajcuUBw"
