= Aide-de-camps of Love =

Aide-de-camps of Love (Russian: Адъютанты любви, Adyutanti lyubvi) is a 2005 Russian telenovela. It is the second successful historical telenovela from Amedia Productions, after Poor Nastya (2003).

== Plot ==
Pyotr Cherkasov and Olga Lopuhina grew up together in the country. They fall in love and decide to get married. But Pyotr's mother doesn't want the two of them together, so she finds "a good opportunity for Olga": Count Roman Mongo-Stolipin, a rich politician from Saint Petersburg. Olga decides to marry the Count.

Pyotr is hurt. He goes to Saint Petersburg to become an adjutant of Tsar Paul. Paul is murdered and is succeeded by his young son Alexander. Pyotr becomes a very good friend of Alexander, who sends him to Paris to spy on Napoleon Bonaparte. Though still in love with Olga, Pyotr becomes part of the politician drama in Europe.

== Cast ==
=== Main roles ===
- Nikita Panfilov as Pyotr Cherkasov
- Karina Razumovskaya as Olga Mongo-Stolipina
- Andrey Ilin as Roman Mongo-Stolipin
- Pavel Barshak as Mikhael Lugin
- Aleksandr Ustyugov as Platon Tolstoi
- Natalia Ivanova-Fenkina / Maria Kozlova as Varvara Lanskaya

=== Supporting roles ===
- Aleksandr Arsentyev as D'Arni
- Aleksandr Efimov as Alexander I of Russia
- Kristina Kuzmina as Empress Elizabeth
- Aleksei Zavyalov as Adam Czartoryski
- Vitaliy Kovalenko as Napoleon I of France
- Irina Nizina as Josephine de Beauharnais
- Ilya Blednyy as Louis Antoine, Duke of Enghien
- Yulia Zhigalina as Ksenya Von Zak
- Aleksandr Abdulov as Horatio Nelson
- Armen Dzhigarkhanyan as Head of the Order of the Illuminati
- Valeri Zolotukhin as Alexander Suvorov
- Marina Zudina as Aglaia Lanskaya
- Alla Kazanskaya as Anna Lopuchina, grandmother Olga Lopukhina
- Avangard Leontiev as Paul I of Russia
- Elena Podkaminskaya as Pauline Bonaparte
- Andrey Smolyakov as Charles Maurice de Talleyrand-Périgord
- Alexander Smirnov as William Pitt the Younger
- Galina Polskikh as Madlen
- Aleksandr Filippenko as Boris Kuragin, godfather Pyotr Cherkasov
- Igor Yasulovich as Peter Ludwig von der Pahlen
- Yevgeny Kindinov as Rene, a monk templar
- Yulia Mayboroda as Hortense de Beauharnais
