= Sklifosovsky (TV series) =

Russian TV series

- Genre: medical drama, romantic drama
- Written by: Oleg Malovichko (Seasons 1-3); Ekaterina Tirdatova (Seasons 1-9; Valentina Shevyakova (Seasons 4-9)
- Directed by: Andrey Selivanov (1 season); Julia Krasnova (Seasons 2-9)
- Composers: Anton Schwartz; Denis Novikov; Dmitry Chizhevsky; Sergey Grigoriev
- Country of origin: Russia
- Original language: Russian
- No. of seasons: 9

Production
- Producers: Alexander Kushaev; Irina Smirnova; Anton Schwartz (music)

Original release
- Network: Russia-1; CBS (USA)
- Release: September 24, 2012

Sklifosovsky (Russian: Склифосовский) is a Russian medical drama television series starring Maksim Averin. The series is about the employees of the Nikolai Vasilich Sklifosovsky Emergency Research Institute. The series premiered on September 24, 2012 on Russia-1.

== Plot ==
The series is set against the backdrop of the legendary Nikolai Vasilich Sklifosovsky Emergency Research Institute. It is dedicated to the complex, dramatic, partly heroic daily life of the famous "Sklif" doctors. Every day the doctors of the Sklifosovsky Research Institute have to make decisions on which human life depends. There are no scheduled patients, long consultations, time to prepare for surgery. It is necessary to act quickly, because every lost minute can cost the patient's life.

The story focuses on Oleg Bragin, a surgeon at the hospital who is dedicated to his work. Despite his professional commitment, he faces challenges in his personal and professional life.

== Cast ==
Actor	Role
Maksim Averin	Oleg Bragin (from the 1st season) from the 1st to the 17th, from the 20th to the 109th, from the 121st to the 153rd, from the 158th to the 162nd, from the 174th episode - one of Sklif's leading surgeons in the Department of Emergency Surgery, from 99th to 109th, from 121st to 153rd series — Deputy Head of the Department of Emergency Surgery, from 110th to 121st series — ambulance paramedic, from 153 1st to 157th series — an employee of the rescue squad "Spas", from 162nd to 174th series — a district doctor in the district clinic. From the 64th to the 66th series he was in the city of Zaretsk after the accident. Former lover of Emma Lusparian, former lover of Larisa Kulikova, former lover of Tatyana Zhulina. Former husband of Lena Mikhaleva. From the 96th series — the husband of Marina Narochinskaya (Bragina). From the 24th series — Tamara's father (daughter from Emma), from the 128th series — Katya's father (daughter from Marina). In the 144th series, metastases were found in him. in the 146th series, he was confirmed to have pheochromocytoma.
Maria Kulikova	Marina Narochinskaya (Bragina) (from season 2) from episodes 26 to 48 and from episodes 83 to 115 — neurosurgeon in the emergency surgery department, from episodes 49 to 81 — head physician of the department surgery, from the 116th series — head of the neurosurgical department. Daughter of Vladimir Narochinsky, former lover of Viktor Khaev, former lover of Alexander. From the 96th series — the wife of Oleg Bragin. From the 128th episode — Katya's mother.
Olga Krasko	Larisa Kulikova (seasons 1-2) from episodes 1 to 26 — head of the emergency surgery department, surgeon. Former lover of Oleg Bragin, ex-wife of Sergei Kulikov. Mother of Nikita Kulikov. In episode 26, she dies at the hands of a drug addict.
Dmitry Miller	Pyotr Pastukhov (seasons 1-4, 10) from 1st to 26th and from 54th to 57th series — vascular surgeon in the department of emergency surgery, from 27th to 53rd series — head of the department of emergency surgery, from 58th to 82nd series - Employee of the Ministry of Health. Husband of Polina Pastukhova. Julia's adoptive father. In episode 83, he leaves with his family for Gelendzhik.
Vladimir Zherebtsov	Konstantin Lazarev (from the 1st season) from the 1st to the 24th series — a resident, from the 25th series — a surgeon of the emergency surgery department. From the 75th series the stepson of Khromov, the son of Maria Valerievna, the grandson of Alexandra Ivanovna. From the 117th to the 120th series he was under investigation. Former boyfriend of Anna Afanasyeva. From the 160th series — the husband of Alexandra Pokrovskaya. Adoptive father of Ilya Khromov.
Anton Eldarov	Salam Gafurov (seasons 1-5) from the 1st to the 12th series — a graduate student, from the 13th to the 58th and from the 70th to the 104th series — a surgeon in the emergency surgery department. From the 24th series — candidate of medical sciences. From the 31st to the 53rd series — Yulia's boyfriend. Alina's elder brother, son of Venera Khalilovna Gafurova. From the 76th to the 105th series — responsible for scientific work. In episode 105, he dies in an accident.
Konstantin Yushkevich	Sergei Kulikov (from the 1st season) from the 12th episode — a trauma surgeon in the emergency department, ex-husband of Larisa Kulikova, ex-lover of Lada Ermilova, ex-lover of Anna Khanina, ex-husband of Olga Dmitrieva (Kulikova). Nikita's father
Alyona Yakovleva	Marina Sheyna (1st season) from the 1st to the 17th series — the head of the medical unit, the common-law wife of Mikhail Iosifovich Breslavets. In the 17th series — she quits along with Breslavets.
Emmanuil Vitorgan	Mikhail Breslavets (1st and 8th season) from the 1st to the 16th series — the head physician of the Department of Surgery, the common-law husband of Marina Sergeevna Sheina. In the 16th episode - he quits for health reasons, from the 146th to the 151st episodes the acting head of the emergency surgery department.

== International airings ==
Australia: Network Ten
Brazil: SBT
Canada: CTV
Denmark: TV2 Zulu
Finland: YLE TV1
France: TF1, 13eme Rue, NT1 and TMC
Germany: RTL
Italy: Rai 2
Poland: TVP2
Portugal: RTP1
Turkey: CNBC-e
Ukraine: 1+1
