= Transit (2006 film) =

- DVD cover
- Directed by: Aleksandr Rogozhkin
- Produced by: Sergei Selyanov
- Starring: Aleksei Serebryakov; Daniil Strakhov; Anastasiya Nemolyaeva; Svetlana Stroganova
- Cinematography: Andrei Zhegalov
- Edited by: Yulia Rumyantseva
- Music by: Dmitri Pavlov
- Production company: CTB
- Release date: 2006
- Running time: 145 minutes
- Country: Russia
- Language: Russian
- Budget: 5,3 million $
- Box office: 0,3 million $

Transit (Russian: Перегон, romanized: Peregon) is a 2006 film from Russian writer-director Aleksandr Rogozhkin, which was presented at the Karlovy Vary International Film Festival. Several of his past films have screened there, including Life with an Idiot and the Chechen war drama Check Point (Blokpost), for which he won the Best Director Prize in 1998. Transit is a story set on a secret military transit base in the remote Chukotka region, where planes from allied forces came in from Alaska, including quite a few with female pilots, which of course attracted the attention of the mostly male Russian crew at the base.

== Plot summary ==
A group of American pilots ferry Lend-Lease Airacobra fighter planes across the ocean through the ALSIB route. The orderly course of life is disrupted when it becomes clear that the American pilots are attractive and charming young women. The feelings of the Russian young men collide with cultural and language barriers resulting in a host of awkward, funny, and sometimes tragic situations.

== Cast ==
- Aleksei Serebryakov as Captain Yurchenko
- Daniil Strakhov as Captain Lisnevsky
- Anastasiya Nemolyaeva as Irina Zareva
- Svetlana Stroganova as Valentina
- Yuri Itskov as Svist
- Stepan Abramov as Fitil'
- Gennady Alekseyev as Wilson
- Daniel Anderson as War Correspondent
- Anna Marina Bensaud as Lieut. Jackson
- Artem Bordovsky as Pulya
- Sarah Bulley as Lieutenant Dana Adams
- Christopher Delsman as Donald Svichkovsky aka 'Doc'
- Andrei Fomin as Chernykh
- Caterina Innocente as Lieutenant Mary McClain
- Yevgeni Kachalov as Rozenfeld
- Roman Kelchin as Semen
- Sergei Konstantinov as Rintyn
- Dmitri Lysenkov as Baron
- Yekaterina Makarova as Rintyn's Wife
- Oleg Malkin as Nulin
- Sergey Medvedev as Os'
- Aleksandr Orlovsky as Vasil'kov
- Yuri Orlov as Romadanovsky
- Sergei Pavlov as Roma
- Grant Petrosian as Vano
- Aleksey Petrov as Vasily
- Ivan Prill as Turovsky
- Sarah Margaret Rutley as Lieut. Tippy Kaufman
- Zakhar Ronzhin as Kaiser
- Anna Rud as Olga
- Andrey Shibarshin as Morze
- Mikhail Sivorin as Bologov
- Ruslan Smirnov as Tutko
- Kirill Ulyanov as Gutsava
- Anatoli Ustinov as Petrov
- Sergei Venzelev as Petya
- Artem Volobuev as Shmatko
- Nathan Thomas White as Pasco
- Trigg Hutchinson as the Corporal
