= Pyotr Krasilov =

Russian film and theater actor

- Пётр Красилов
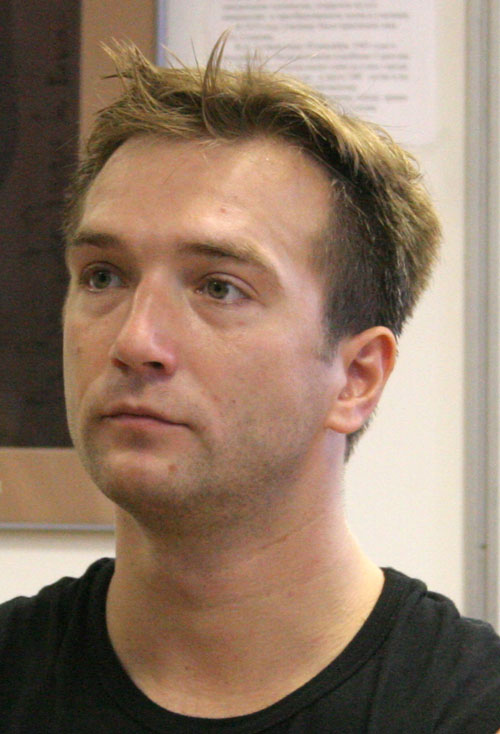
- Pyotr Krasilov actor at a press conference in Saratov Drama Theater
- Born: Pyotr Anatolyevich Krasilov; 3 June 1977 (age 48); Balashikha, Moscow Oblast, RSFSR, USSR
- Occupation: Actor
- Years active: 2003-presents
- Spouse(s): Natalya Selivanova (divorced); Irina Shebko

Pyotr Anatolyevich Krasilov (Russian: Пётр Анато́льевич Краси́лов; born 3 June 1977) is a Russian film and theater actor.

== Biography ==
Pyotr Krasilov was born in Balashikha near Moscow. His family consisted of mostly Putilov company employees, dispatchers, railway workers. His mother worked for a while in the circus, in the personnel department.

In 1999 he graduated from the Mikhail Shchepkin Higher Theatre School. Then for a while he worked in the Russian Army Theatre and then in Lenkom. But Krasilov did not stay long in either place. Pyotr did not get major roles immediately, but soon he received a proposal from the Academic Youth Theatre.

The first role of Pyotr Krasilov in film was Mikhail Repnin in the series Poor Nastya (2003).

He appeared in the third season of ice show contest Ice Age (with Oksana Grishuk).

== Selected filmography ==
- 2003 Poor Nastya (TV Series) as Prince Mikhail Alexandrovich Repnin
- 2004 Sins of the Fathers (TV Series) as Dmitry Pavlovsky
- 2005 Not Born Beautiful (TV Series) as Roman Malinovsky Roman Malinovskiy
- 2007 Second Wind as Pavel Makarov
- 2007 Patties with Potatoes as Yuri
- 2010 Carousel as Denis
- 2011 The Secret Service Agent's Memories (2 Season) as Semyon Plakhov
- 2011 Surprise Me as major Roman Zubov

== Awards ==
- Winner of the Audience Choice Award (1995)
- Winner of the Chayka Award (nominated for Breakthrough, 2002) for the role of Erast Fandorin in the play The Winter Queen
- Merited Artist of the Russian Federation (2019)
