= Dmitry Miller =

Russian theater actor (born 1972)

- Дмитрий Миллep
- Born: Dmitry Arturovich Miller; 2 April 1972 (age 54); Mytishchi, Moscow Oblast, RSFSR, USSR
- Citizenship: Soviet Union; Russian
- Occupation: Actor
- Years active: 2001–present
- Website: dmitriy-miller.ucoz.ru

Dmitry Arturovich Miller (Russian: Дми́трий Арту́рович Ми́ллер; born 2 April 1972) is a Russian theater actor.

== Biography ==
Dmitry Miller was born on 2 April 1972 in suburban Mytishchi, Moscow Oblast, Russian SFSR, Soviet Union. After school he entered a medical college. One day he went to Moscow and saw an advertisement for the recruitment of students in drama school. He successfully auditioned and was enrolled for the course. Soon he became a student of Mikhail Shchepkin Higher Theatre School.

In 2001, Dmitry Miller graduated from the Shchepkin Higher Theatre School. The actor joined the troupe of musical theater On Basman, where he worked for almost four years.

His debut in cinema was the feature film The Sovereign's Servant, where the actor starred as Chevalier D'Breze in a French speaking role.

Afterwards he had small roles in various television movies, such as the popular television series Turetsky's March. Then he successfully starred the series Next. Later he received more recognition with Montecristo.

For his leading role in the movie Happy Journey the actor received several awards and a nomination for Best Actor at the 49th International Festival of TV films Golden Nymph in Monte Carlo.

He appeared in the second season of ice show contest Ice Age.

== Personal life ==
- Wife: Actress Julia Dellos (born 3 October 1971).
- Twin daughters: Alisa-Victoria and Marianna-Darina (born in 2014).

== Selected filmography ==
- 2001: Next (TV Series) as guard
- 2007: The Sovereign's Servant as Chevalier Charles de Brézé
- 2008: Montecristo (TV Series) as Maksim Orlov
- 2008: Two of Fate. New Life (TV Series) as Grigory
- 2010: Masakra as Vladimir Pazurkevich, graph-werewolf
- 2011 / 2014: Traffic Lights (TV Series) as Eduard, confirmed bachelor
- 2012 / 2015, 2023: Sklifosovsky (TV Series) as Pyotr Pastukhov
- 2015: The Eighties (TV Series) as Ilya, editor of Ogonyok Magazine
- 2017: Anna Karenina: Vronsky's Story as Aleksandr, Vronsky' s brother
- 2021: Girls Got Game as Kudryavtsev
- 2021: Champion of the World as Sevastyanov
- 2024: Crime and Punishment as False-Svidrigailov
