= Sklifosovsky Institute for Emergency Medicine =

Emergency medicine research hospital in Moscow, Russia

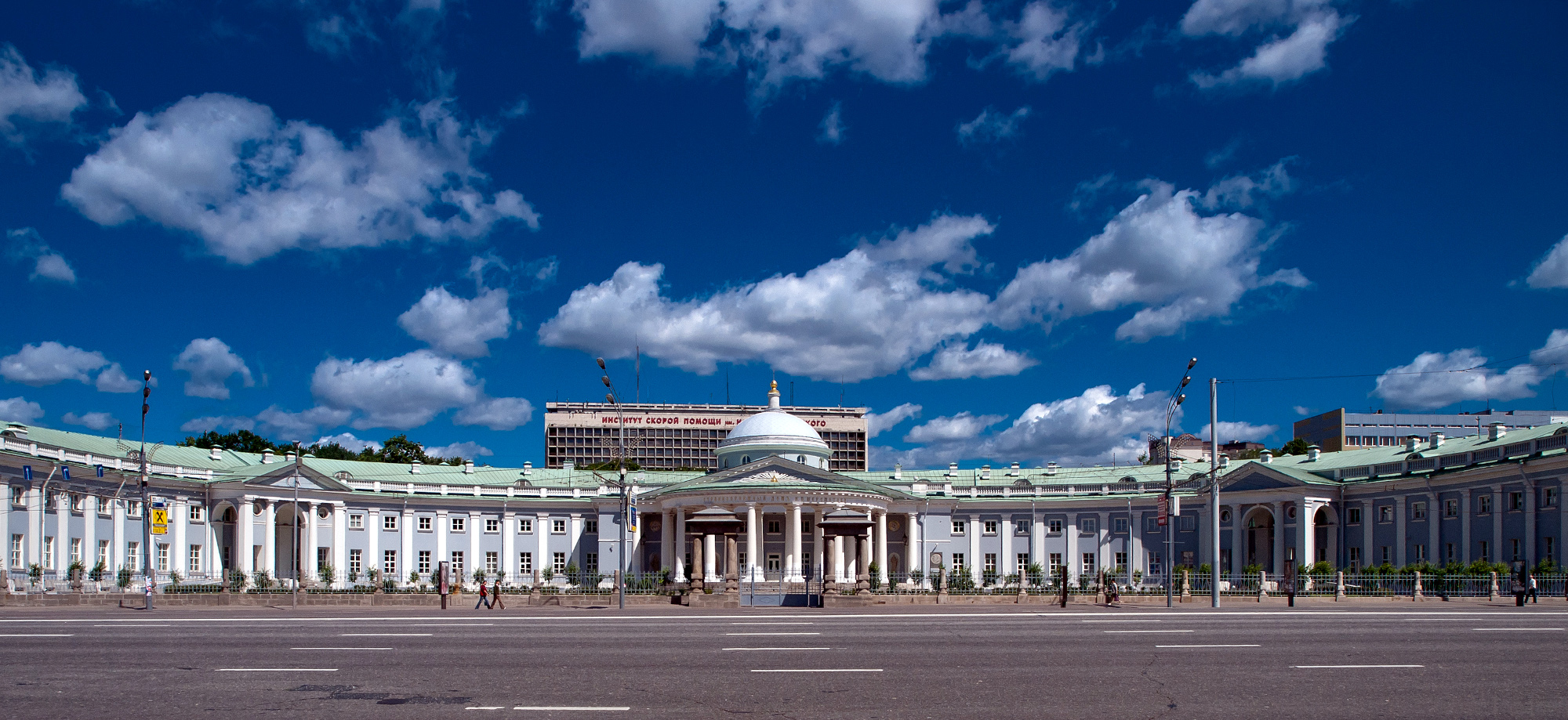

Geography
- Location: Moscow, Russia
- Coordinates: 55°46′24″N 37°38′07″E

Organisation
- Network: Health Department of the Government of Moscow

Services
- Emergency department: Yes

Helipads
- Helipad: Yes

History
- Founded: 1810

Links
- Website: sklif.mos.ru (in Russian)
- Lists: Hospitals in Russia

The Sklifosovsky Institute for Emergency Medicine (Russian: Институт скорой помощи имени Склифосовского), known more commonly as the Sklifosovsky Institute or by the nickname Sklif, is an emergency medicine research hospital in the Meshchansky District of Moscow, Russia. Named for the Russian surgeon and physiologist N. V. Sklifosovsky, it is located on the Garden Ring circular ring road around the centre of Moscow.

It was one of the first in Russia and is the largest multidisciplinary scientific and practical center in the capital. It specialises in emergency medical care, emergency surgery, resuscitation, combined and burn trauma, emergency cardiology and acute poisoning.

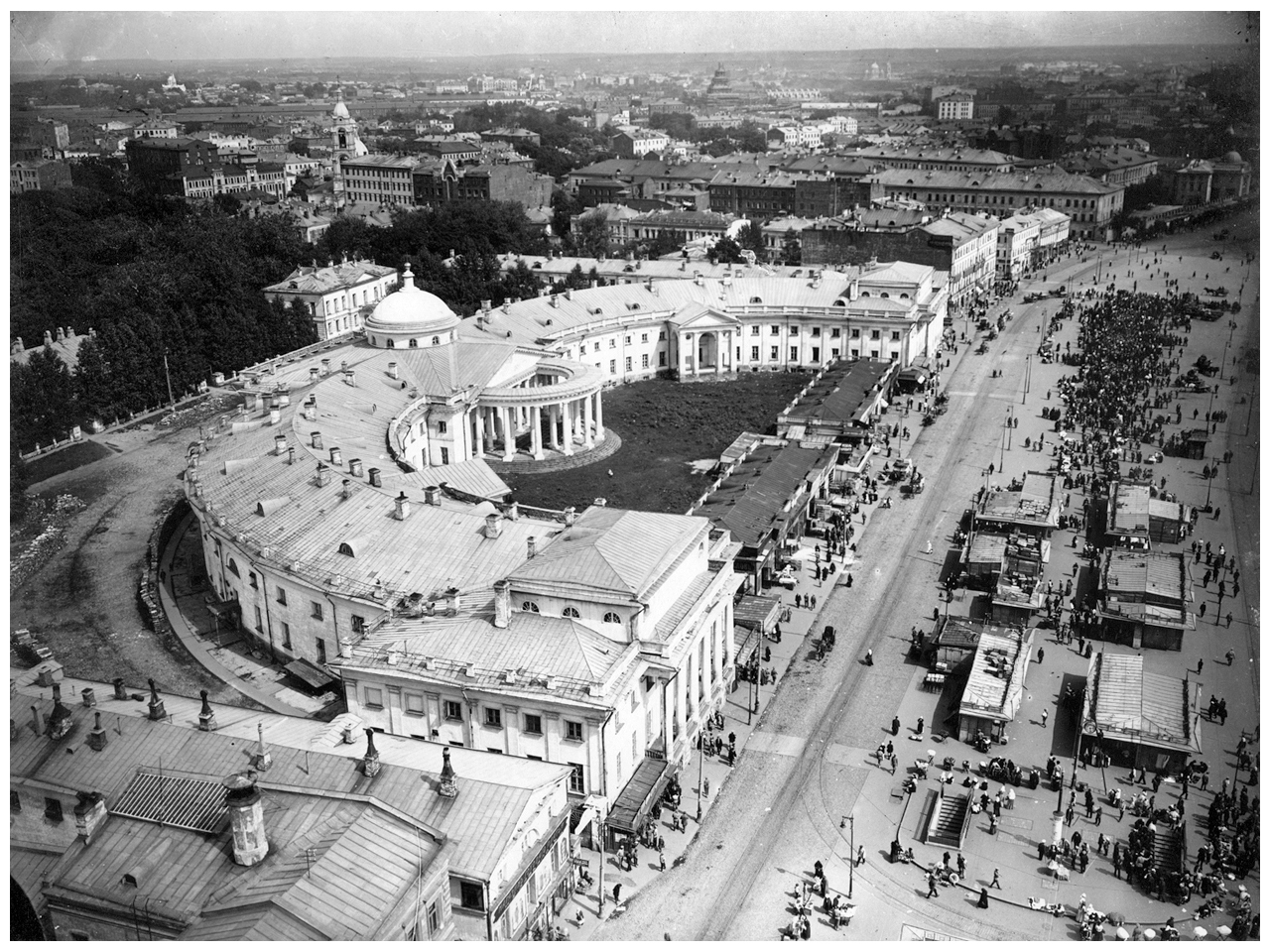
The main building of the Sklifosovsky Institute, pictured in 1914

The Sklifosovsky Institute played a major part in Moscow's response to the COVID-19 pandemic.

== In fiction ==
The hospital was the setting of the long-running Russian TV medical drama Sklifosovsky.
