= Dimitri Isayev (actor) =

Russian actor (born 1973)

- Дмитрий Исаев
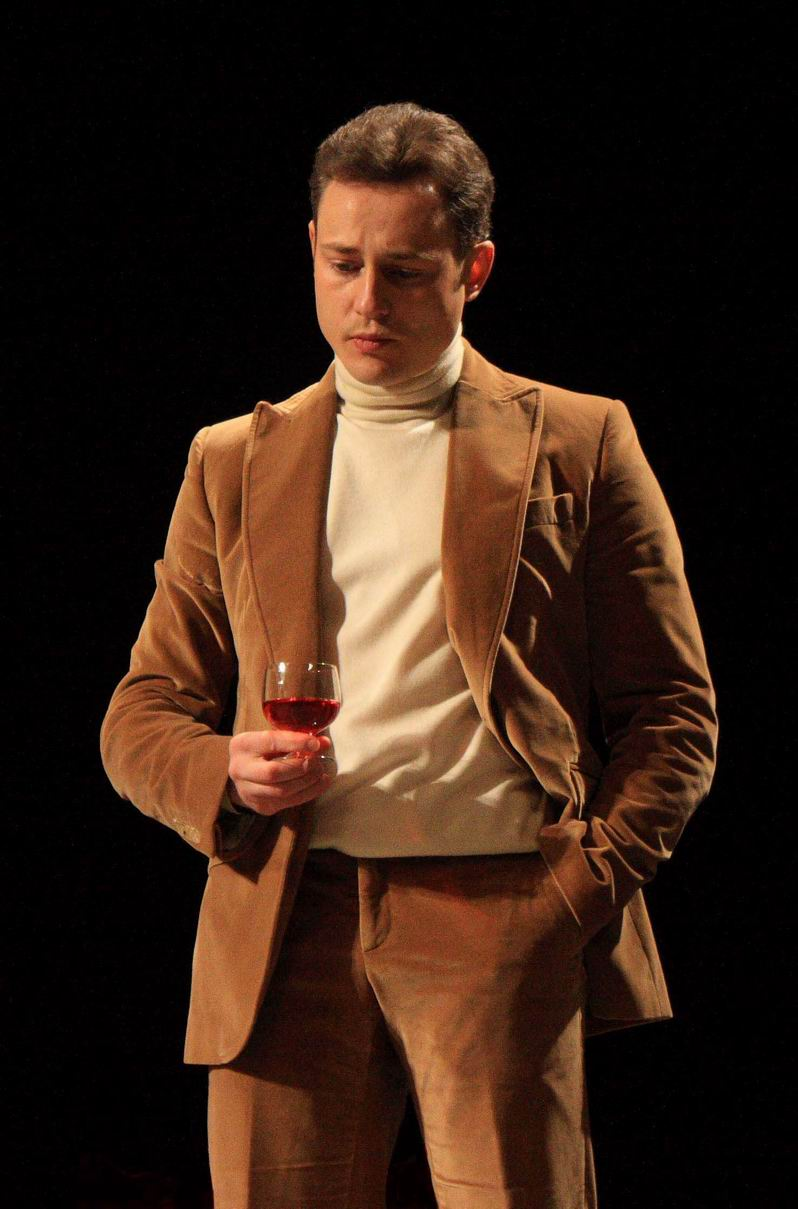
- Dimitri Isayev in the Drama Theatre, 2010
- Born: Dimitri Alekseyevich Isayev; 23 January 1973 (age 53); Leningrad, RSFSR, USSR (now Saint Petersburg, Russia)
- Occupation: Actor
- Years active: 1994–present
- Website: Dmitriy Isaev

Dimitri Alekseyevich Isayev (also tr. Dmitriy Isaev, Russian: Дмитрий Алексеевич Исаев; born 23 January 1973) is a Russian actor. He had prominent roles in film and television.

== Early life ==
Isayev was born in Leningrad, Russian SFSR, Soviet Union, into a family with strong connections to the performing arts through his parents' involvement with the Tovstonogov Bolshoi Drama Theater (the son of a famous Soviet actor Vladislav Strzhelchik). He studied violin and piano.

Isayev held various jobs prior to entering the Saint Petersburg State Theatre Arts Academy from which he subsequently graduated in 1996. He served in the theater "Russian Enterprise" named after Andrei Mironov, "Comedian's Shelter" in the Komissarjevsky Theatre. In parallel, he worked fitness trainer, a masseur a store manager and was involved in dance, writing and song arranging. He appeared on television and radio programs. He was the second director in dubbing and film scoring.

== Personal life ==
He married three times and twice divorced. His first marriage yielded two children, Sophia and Pauline. Isayev's first wife was Asya Shibarova, a classmate at the institute, and now an actress. The marriage ended amicably.

His second wife was prima ballerina Inna Ginkevich. He then married Oksana Rozhok, a former ballet dancer, and resides in Serpukhov. In 2014, the couple had a son Alexander.

== Filmography ==
Isayev's works include:

- 1994 Debussy, or Mademoiselle Shu-Shu as Mozart
- 2001 Silver Wedding (TV)
- 2002 Госпожа победа (сериал) в роли Славы
- 2002 Sea node (TV series) as Eugene, scientist oceanographer
- 2003 Bandit Petersburg. Movie 6. Journalist (mini-series) as Vladik
- 2003 The Emperor's Love (TV series) as tsarevich
- 2003 Mongoose (TV series) as football
- 2003 Streets of Broken Lights (TV Series 1 "Disinfection") as operative Pakhomov
- 2003-2004 Poor Nastya (TV series) as Czarevitch Alexander (Czar Alexander II)
- 2004-2005 Sins of the Fathers (TV series) as Peter Volkov
- 2004 Dear Masha Berezina (TV series) as violinist Eugene Abramov
- 2004 Online game as bogatyr
- 2005 Happy birthday, Queen! (TV) as Major George Andestend
- 2006 The Return of the Prodigal Pope (TV) as Aleksey
- 2006 Of flame and light (mini-series) as Prince Alexander Vasilchikov
- 2007 War and Peace (mini-series) as Nikolai Rostov
- 2007 Quartet for Two (TV) as Vadim
- 2007 Full breath as Kostya
- 2007 Can you hear me? as stepfather Lehi
- 2008 Our sins (TV) as Sergei
- 2008 Sand rain (TV) as Igor Zorin
- 2008 Vicissitudes of life (TV) as Anton Bestuzhev, husband of Dasha
- 2008 Blue Beard (TV) as Phillip
- 2009 Obsessed (TV series) as attorney Herman Dubrovnik
- 2010 Zagradotryad: Solo in a minefield (mini-series) as Cornflower
- 2010 There are six cartridges in the pistol (short film) as A hero
- 2010 Captain Gordeev. Brothers Blood (TV series, 1 season) as Kirill Shustov
- 2010 Hear My Heart (TV) as Kirill
- 2011 Vow of Silence (TV) as Goshi
- 2011 Prediction (TV) as Igor
- 2011 Бесприданница в роли Сергея Паратова
- 2011 Terminal (TV series) as Maks Orlov, head of brokerage
- 2011 Pushken (Ukraine, not completed ) as Olenin
- 2011 Goddesses (Ukraine) as the heroine 's husband
- 2011 Gossamer Indian summer (TV) as Sergei
- 2011 Clues (TV series) as Sukhanov
- 2011 House on the edge as Sergei
- 2011 Sect (TV Mini-Series) as Daniil
- 2012 Wild 3 (TV series) as Konstantin Sergeevich
- 2012 2A (short film) as Artyom
- 2012 Every for himself (TV series) as Igor
- 2012 Give Me Sunday (TV series) as Mikhail Antonov
- 2012 1812: Ulan Ballad as Alexander I
- 2012 The last victim (TV) as Aleksey
- 2013 Not a woman's business (TV series) as Aleksey Gavrilov, lawyer
- 2013 Swear to protect (TV series) as Eugene Krechetov
- 2013 Flowers of Evil (mini-series) as Anatoly, a radio journalist
- 2013-2014 Bones (Russian version) (mini-series) as Denis, an Internet acquaintance of Kostina
- 2014 The road home (TV series) as Denis Romanov
- 2015 Golden Cage (TV series)
- 2015 Fulcrum points (TV series) as Kirill, Alexandra's husband
- 2015 Unthinkable life (TV series) as Dmitry Murashov, an official from the Department of Trade
- 2015 Village roman (TV series) as Vadim Shevelkov
- 2015 Not a couple (TV series) as Nechaev
- 2016 Provocateur (TV series) as Head of the department, Colonel Viktor Alekseevich Kamov
- 2017 Young Lady and Hooligan (TV series) as Michael Shalnov
- 2018 Чужая (TV series) as Sergey Polyakov
- 2018 Незнакомка в зеркале (TV series) as Danilov, plastic surgeon
- 2018 Shadow (TV series) as Constantin
- 2019 Legend Ferrari (TV series) as Adjutant Wrangel, staff captain Vladimir Spesivtsev
- 2019 Detective in a million (TV series) as millionaire Oleg Filatov
- 2020 Detective in a million-2 Victims of art (TV series) as millionaire Oleg Filatov
- 2020 Detective in a million-3 Werewolf (TV series) as millionaire Oleg Filatov
- 2021 Detective in a million-4 Payback (TV series) as millionaire Oleg Filatov
- 2021 Зацепка (TV сериал) в роли безнесмена Владимира Резника
- 2021 According to the laws of wartime-5 Mutiny (TV series) as Captain of the Main Directorate of Information of the Polish Army Wlodek Wisniewski
- 2021 The Mystery of the Sleeping Lady (TV series) as businessman Mikhail Gorlov
- 2021 A twist on happiness (TV series) as Dmitry Kovalev
- 2022 Odessa (in production) (TV series)
- 2022 Репейник
- 2022 Blind method
