= Maksim Averin =

Russian actor

- Максим Аверин
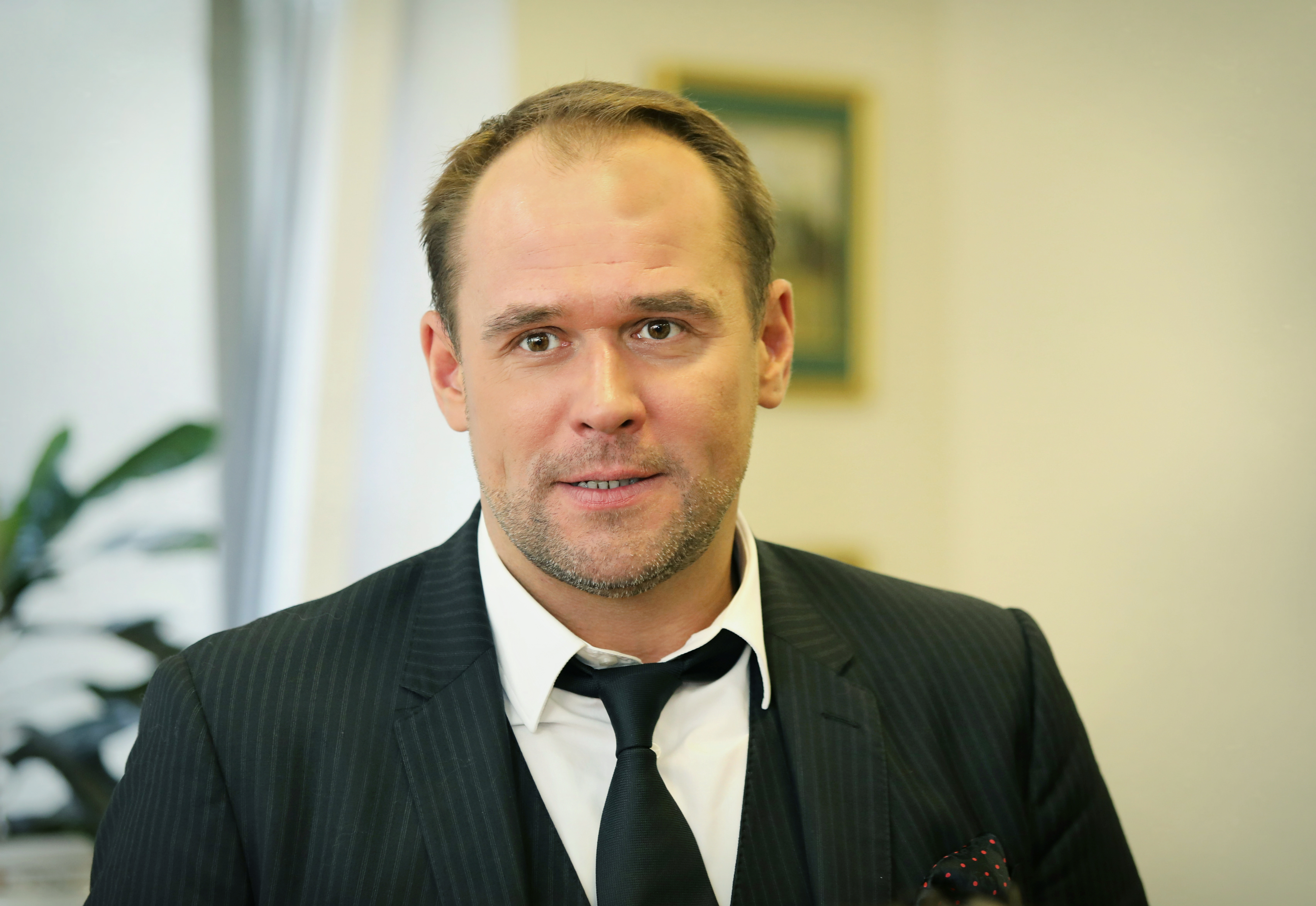
- Averin in 2017
- Born: Maksim Viktorovich Averin; 26 November 1975 (age 50); Moscow, RSFSR, USSR
- Education: Boris Shchukin Theatre Institute
- Occupations: Actor, presenter
- Years active: 1998–present

Maksim Viktorovich Averin (Russian: Макси́м Ви́кторович Аве́рин; 26 November 1975) is a Russian actor who works in theater, film and television. He is best known for starring in the long running medical drama television series Sklifosovsky. He is also a television director and presenter. He was named an Honored Artist of the Russian Federation in 2014.

== Biography ==
Maksim Averin was born in Moscow, Russian SFSR, Soviet Union. His father worked at the Mosfilm as a painter-decorator. Averin made his debut on the silver screen at the age of six. Once in second grade Maksim refused to write a math test and said that he did not need it at drama school.

In 1997 he graduated with honors from Boris Shchukin Theatre Institute, at the Vakhtangov State Academic Theatre. He played in the Satyricon Theatre for eighteen years, In Satyricon he played in Macbeth, Richard III, King Lear, Lion in Winter, Hamlet, Hedda Gabler and others.

January 7, 2023, against the backdrop of 2022 Russian invasion of Ukraine, was included in the sanctions list of Ukraine.

== Career ==
Maksim Averin's film career began in 1999 with the role of Korabelnikov in the comedy Love is Evil directed by Vladimir Zaykin. After this work, the actor even was called Russian Jim Carrey. He won the TEFI Award for Best Actor on TV in 2011.

Since 2014 Averin host of the show Three Chords on Channel One Russia.

== Filmography ==
Year	Title	Role	Notes
1999	Love is Evil	Korabelnikov	
2003	Firefighters	Denis Rogozin	TV series
2003	Magnetic Storms	Valera	
2005	Carousel	Oleg Korneev	TV series
2005	City Without the Sun	Yegor	
2006	Doctor Zhivago	Man-'bush'	TV mini-series
2006	Cat's Waltz	Murz	
2007	Love One	Denis Shumsky	
2007	Varvara's Wedding	Yusup Bekirov	
2008	Glukhar	Captain Sergei Glukharyov	TV series
2009	Glukhar. Come the New Year!	Captain Sergei Glukharyov	TV series
2010	Glukhar. Return	Captain Sergei Glukharyov	TV series
2010	Glukhar the Movie	Major Sergei Glukharyov	Film
2011	Glukhar. Coming Back	Major Sergei Glukharyov	TV series
2011	Homecoming	Gleb Belov	TV series
2011	Once Upon a Time There Lived a Simple Woman	Alexander	
2012	Serving Soviet Union!	Dontsov	
since 2012	Sklifosovsky	Dr. Oleg Bragin	TV series
2013	Goryunov	Pavel Goryunov	TV series
2014	Kuprin. Pit	Zheltkov	TV mini-series
2014	Man-Bait	Gena	TV series
2016	The Partners	Yegor / Matvey	TV series
