= Anna Gorshkova =

Russian actress and model (born 1983)

- Анна Горшкова
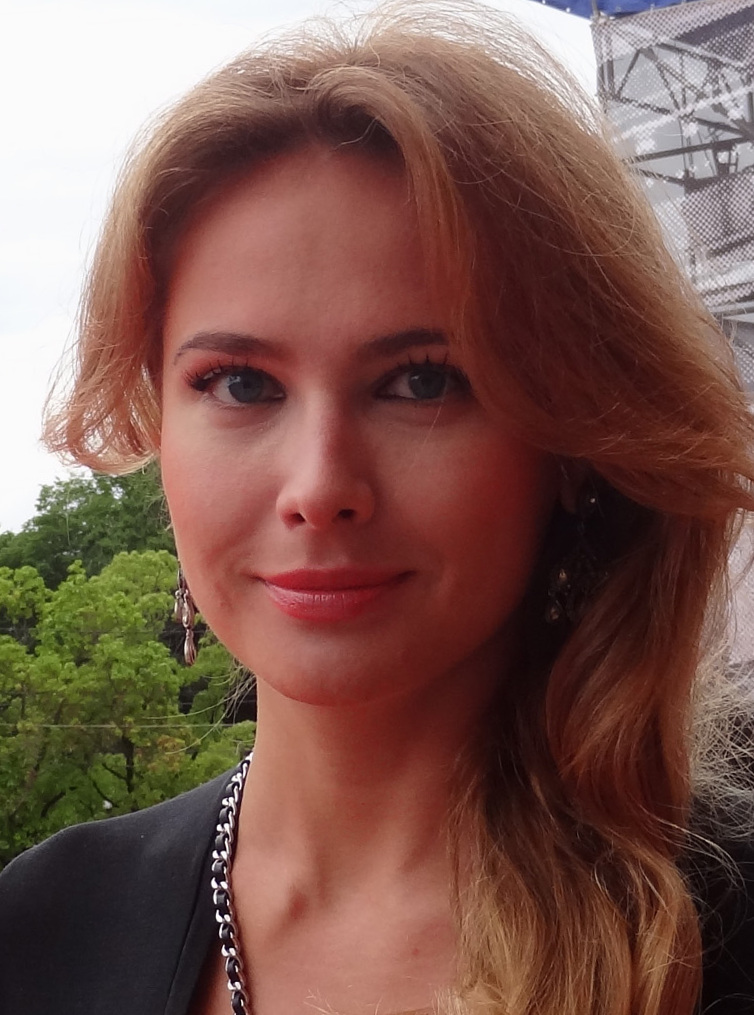
- Anna Gorshkova in 2014
- Born: Anna Andreyevna Gorshkova; 28 November 1983 (age 42); Moscow, RSFSR, USSR
- Occupations: Actress, model
- Years active: 2003–present
- Spouse: Mikhail Borschyov (m. 2007; div. 2009)

Anna Andreyevna Gorshkova (Russian: Анна Андре́евна Горшко́ва; born 28 November 1983) is a Russian actress and model, who made her debut as Polina Penkova in the 2003 soap opera Bednaya Nastya.

== Biography ==
Gorshkova was born in Moscow, Russian SFSR, Soviet Union. Her father, Andrei Gorshkov, worked in the KGB, and her mother, Tatiana, graduated from the Plekhanov Institute of National Economy, but after the birth of Anna devoted herself to raising her daughter. Gorshkova's parents divorced when she was four years old and her father immigrated to the United States. Despite this, she and her father kept a great relationship.

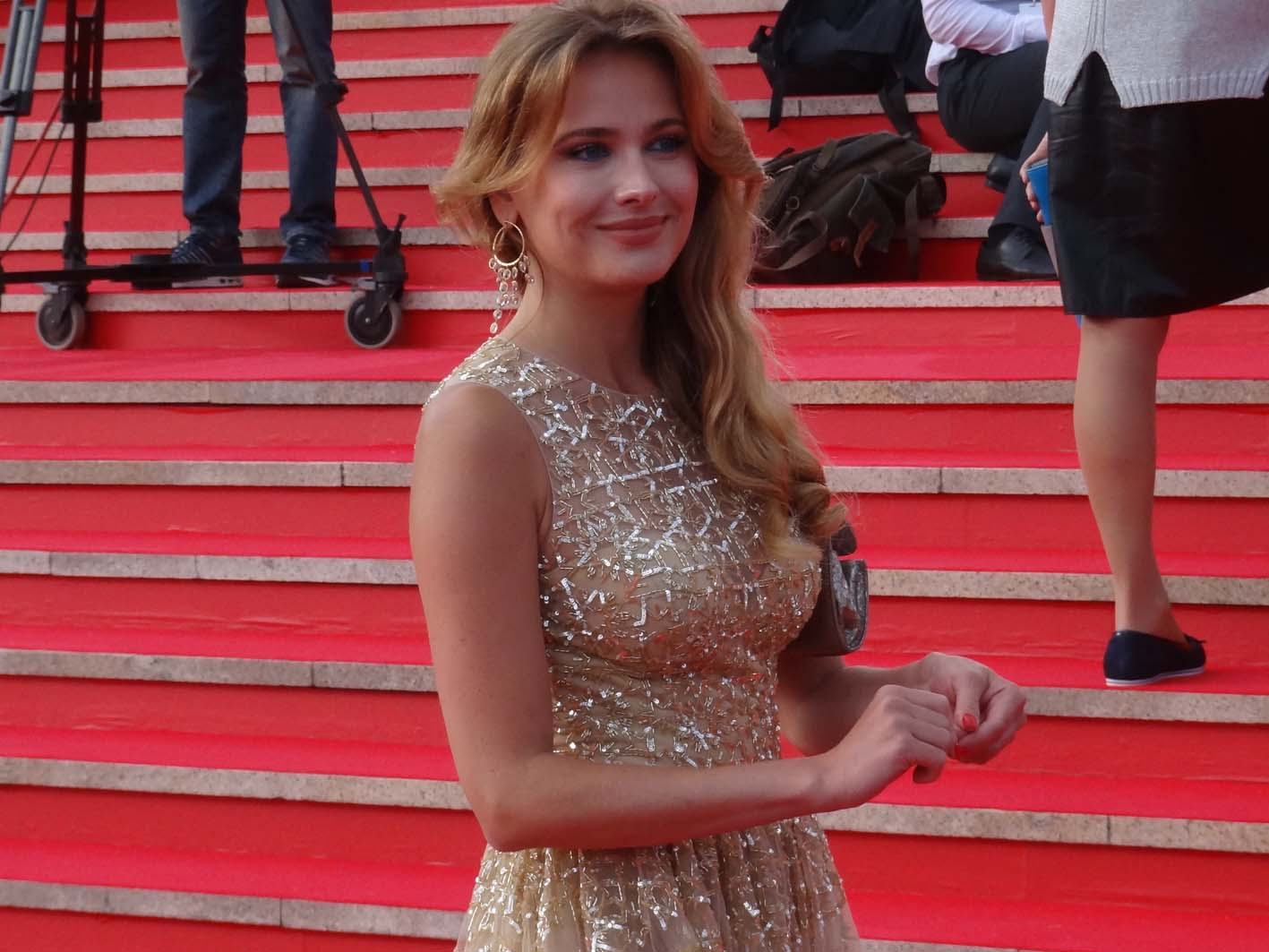
Anna Gorshkova at the film festival Kinotavr in Sochi, 2014

== Filmography ==
=== Films ===
Year	Title	Role
2007	Olympics. Local Warming	Anna
2008	Passenger	Vera Sergeyevna Klark
2008	Dnipro Abroad	Nurse Zoya Sintsova

=== Television ===
Year	Title	Role
2003–2004	Poor Nastya	Polina Penkova
2005	Dear Masha Berezina	Olga Smirnova
2005	Two Fates 2. Blue Blood	Darya
2005	Two Fates 3. Golden Cage	Darya
2006–2007	My Prechistenka	Sima
2006	Ticket to the Harem	Masha
2006	Provincial Passion	Alena
2008	Heavy Sand	Zinaida
2008	Two Fates. New Life	Darya
2011	Deli Case No. 1	Lyudmila Zakharova
2012	Save or Destroy	Katya Mironova
2014	House with Lilies	Liliya Govorova
2022	Ibiza Affair	Oligarch's niece
