= Oleg Ryaskov =

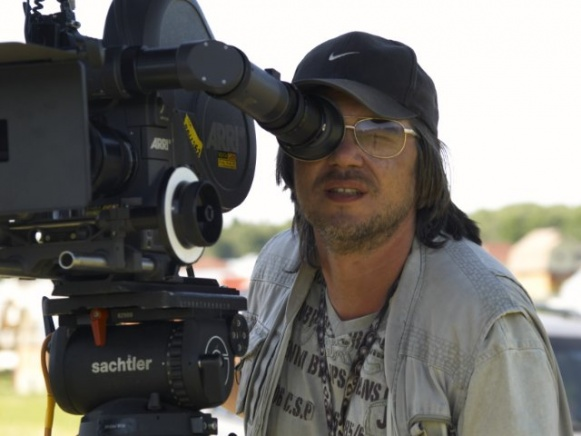
- Born: Oleg Stanislavovich Ryaskov; 31 May 1961 (age 65); Moscow, Soviet Union
- Occupations: Filmmaker, producer, writer
- Years active: 1989–present
- Partner(s): Julia Labutina, 1 child;

Oleg Ryaskov is a director, screenwriter, and producer. He was born in Moscow into a family of engineers. Oleg Ryaskov studied at Moscow architecture University. During his studies, he began to work in cinema and TV. His career began with Vladislav Listyev in the TV show TEMA. In 1992 he made the TV Show Nostalgie. He worked as a chief director of the TV channel Stolica, then chief Director at the morning channel TV6, conducted a survey as directed more than 20 ballet performances in the theater of Stanislavsky and Nemirovich Danchenko. A supervised cycle of documentary films Mysteries of the Century channel 1 (Russia). From 2002 Oleg Ryaskov specializes in historical movies. The most famous of his movies is The Sovereign's Servant, shown in more than 20 countries and has participated in international festivals in presenting his films in Italy, Sweden, Holland, Russia.

== Filmography ==
=== Director ===
- Chor – (movie 1987)
- Spas – (music movie 1988)
- Stanislavsky theatre ballets performance (TV series)(1990) 32 episodes
- TEMA (TV show 1991)
- Nostalgie (TV music show 1992–1997)
- L-club (TV show 1992)
- circle of history (TV show 1993–1995)
- 12 s polovinoy kresel ili Vsyo naoborot (TV series 1996) 25 episodes
- Military Romance (TV movie 2 series 1998)
- Sovety professora Chaynikova (TV series 2002) 12 episodes
- Tayny veka (TV series documentary 2003) 30 episodes
- Aleksandrovskiy sad (TV series 2005) 12 episodes
- The Sovereign's Servant (movie 2007)
- The secret service agent's memories (Zapiski ekspeditora Taynoy kantselyarii 2010) 8 episodes
- The secret service agent's memories 2(Zapiski ekspeditora Taynoy kantselyarii-2 2011) 8 episodes
- The Sovereign's Servant. Director Cut (movie 2022)

=== Producer ===
- 12 s polovinoy kresel ili Vsyo naoborot (TV series) (1996)
- Military Romance (1998)
- Tayny veka (TV series documentary)(2003)
- The Sovereign's Servant (2007)
- The secret service agent's memories Zapiski ekspeditora Taynoy kantselyarii (2010)
- The secret service agent's memories2 Zapiski ekspeditora Taynoy kantselyarii 2 (2011)

=== Writer ===
- 12 s polovinoy kresel ili Vsyo naoborot (TV series) (1996)
- Military Romance (1998)
- Tayny veka (TV series documentary)(2003)
- The Sovereign's Servant (2007)
- The secret service agent's memories aka Zapiski ekspeditora Taynoy kantselyarii (2010)
- The secret service agent's memories2 aka Zapiski ekspeditora Taynoy kantselyarii 2 (2011)
- The King of Madagascar (2015)
- Random factor (2016)
- The Black lake (2017)
- By the waves of my memory (2022)
- Happy birthday, bro (2022)

=== Theatre ===
It was made more than 20 films of musical Stanislavsky theatre performances by Oleg Ryaskov (with Dmitriy Bryancev)

=== TV ===
- TEMA (TV show 1990)
- L-cub (TV show 1992)
- Koleso istorii (TV show 1995)
- Nostagie. Music of all generation (music show 1992–1997)
- Our song (TV show 1993)
- Tayni veka (documentary series 2002)

=== Career ===
- General director of Beta film (CIS)(1991–1999)
- Chiff director TV channel STOLICA (1999–2001)
- Senior director of TV company OSTANKINO (2002–2005)
- President of BFT entertainment LTD (2005–2008)
- General producer of BFT MOVIE (2008–2014)
- General director of BFT MOVIE (2014)

=== Awards ===
- 1998 International film festival in Volgograd 1 prize for the patriot movie
- 2002 Tefi (Russia) nomination for the best journalistic investigation
- 2008 MTV nomination for the best fight in cinema.
- 2014 nomination for the best TV series and movie

=== External links ===
- Oleg Ryaskov official site
- Oleg Ryaskov at IMDb
- official site of the movie «The Sovereign's Servant»
- official site of the movie «The secret service agent's memories»
- official site of BFT Movie
- The Sovereign's Servant at IMDb
- St Petersburg Forum examines state of Russian co-productions

=== Criticism ===
- review by Mart Sander (The Sovereign's Servant)
- reviews (The Sovereign's Servant)
- review in Amazone.com
