= The Secret Service Agent's Memories =

Russian historical television series

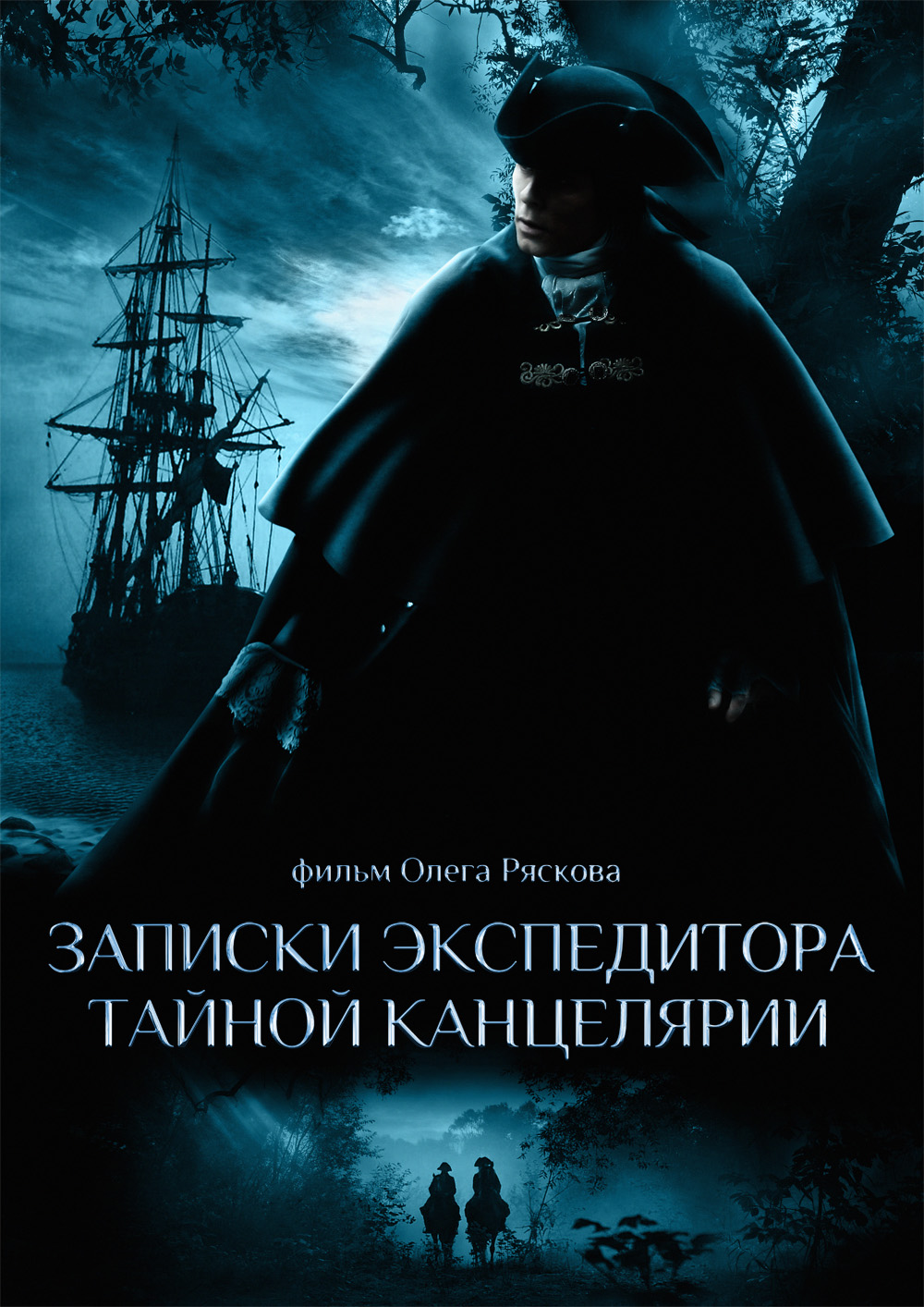
- Written by: Oleg Ryaskov
- Directed by: Oleg Ryaskov
- Starring: Sergey Chonishvili; Anna Snatkina; Pyotr Krasilov; Ilya Sokolovsky; Andrei Ryklin; Darya Melnikova
- Music by: Edgar Arens
- Original languages: Russian; English

Production
- Producers: Yekaterina Yefanova; Oleg Ryaskov
- Running time: 293 minutes
- Budget: US$5,000,000

Original release
- Release: 2011

The Secret Service Agent's Memories (Russian: Записки экспедитора Тайной канцелярии, romanized: Zapiski ekspeditora Taynoy kantselyarii) is a Russian historical television series based on the novel by Oleg Ryaskov, who is also the director.

== Plot ==
A messenger of the Order of Masons visits Prince Menshikov with a plan to marry the heir to the throne to the daughter of a gray cardinal. At the same time, the prince is visited by a young officer, Ivan Samoilov. He receives the task, which, having shown ingenuity and courage, performs brilliantly. After that, the head of the Secret Chancellery Andrei Ushakov draws attention to the resourceful officer and, thanks to a deft intrigue, forces him to enter the service of his department. Now Ivan can expect dizzying adventures: hunting for a serial killer, investigating the death of an elderly nobleman in a house of tolerance, trying to figure out the intrigues of the ancestor of evil, etc.

== Cast ==
- Sergey Chonishvili as Ushakov, head of Secret Chancellery
- Anna Snatkina as Anastasia Vorontsova
- Pyotr Krasilov as Semyon Plakhov
- Ilya Sokolovsky as Ivan Samoilov
- Mikhail Politseymako as Henry Anroville
- Maksim Dakhnenko as Van Hoover
- Andrei Ryklin as Prince Menshikov
- Aleksandr Tereshko as Joe Bucket, Captain of the Pirates
- Darya Melnikova as Fyokla
- Yekaterina Yudina as Ann Bonnie
- Sergey Serov as Duke Belozerov
- Elena Burlakova as Varvara Belozerova
- Olga Ajaja as Sofia Belozerova
- Aleksandr Starikov as Prince Tolstoi
- Yevgeny Radko as La Shanieau
- Anna Nosatova as Mary
- Andrei Bolsunov as French Ambassador
- Boris Kamorzin as Duke Firsanov
- Marina Mogilevskaya as Duchess Firsanova
- Alevtina Dobrynina as Madame Sophie
- Yuri Vasiliev as English Ambassador
- Roman Macedonsky as Peter II
- Yekaterina Rednikova as Maria Karlovna
- Yuriy Nazarov as Yakov Petrovich
- Vladimir Nikitin as Count Orlov
- Anna Starshenbaum as Kat

== The scenery ==
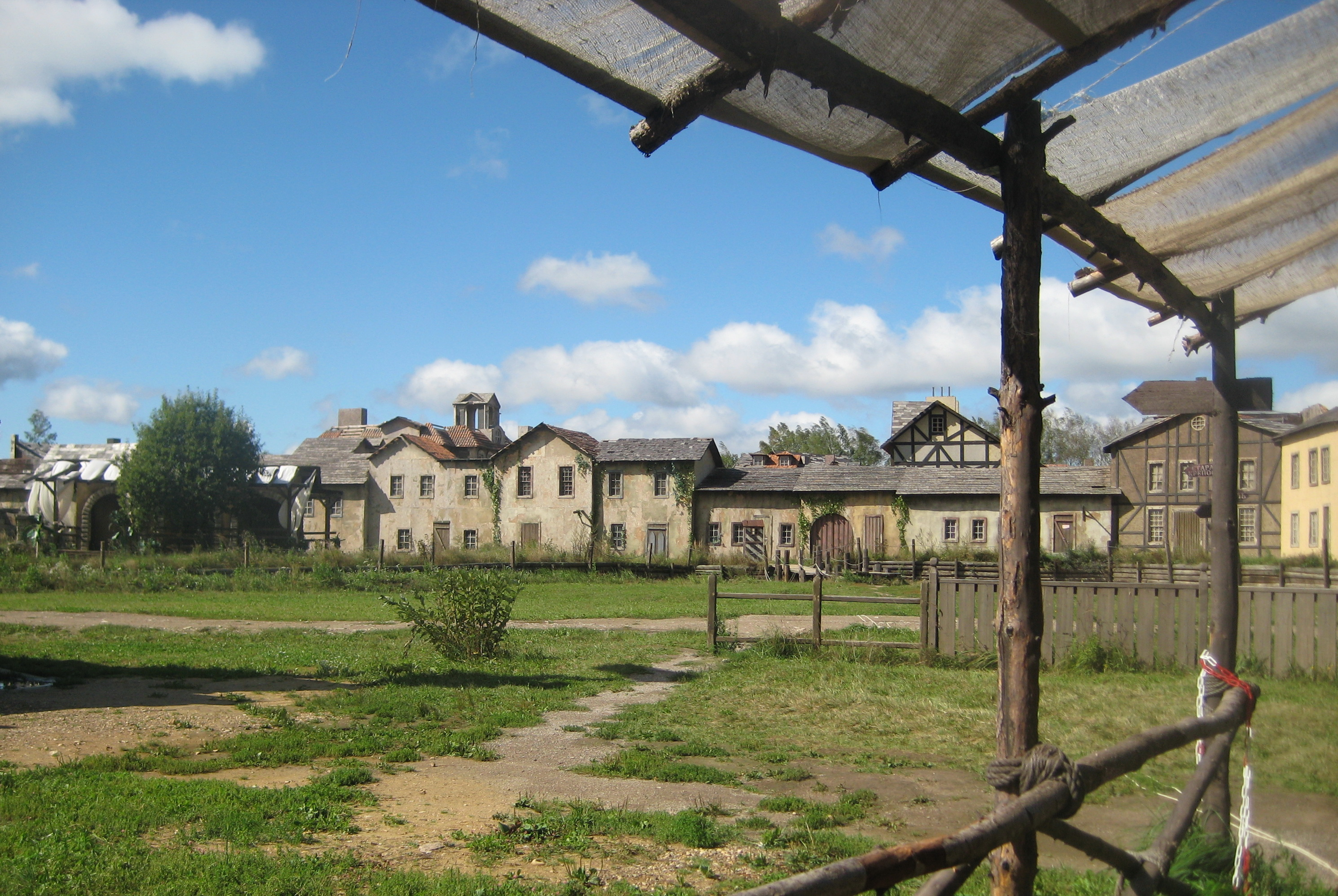
Movie Scenery in Serednikovo of Moscow Oblast

Season 2 was built on the scenery of the city in the 18th century.

== Other titles of the series ==
- Pakt des Bösen — Der Agent des Zaren (Germany)
- Pakt des Bösen 2 — Die Rückkehr (Germany)
- The secret service agent’s memories (USA)
- Memoirs of a Secret Agent (Europe)
- Нотатки експедитора Таємної канцелярії (Ukraine)
- ยอดสายลับประจัญบาน ปี (Thailand)
- Pastabos transportavimo Secret kanceliarijos (Lithuania)
