= Daniil Strakhov =

Russian film and television actor

- Даниил Страхов
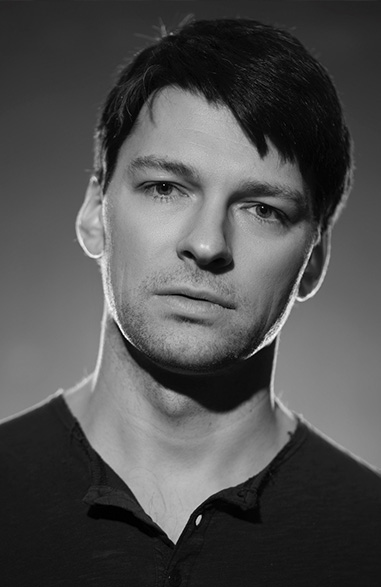
- Born: 2 March 1976 (age 50); Moscow, RSFSR, Soviet Union
- Occupation: Actor
- Years active: 1996–present
- Spouse: Maria Leonova
- Website: www.d-strahov.ru

Daniil Alexandrovich Strakhov (Russian: Даниил Александрович Страхов; born 2 March 1976) is a Russian actor. Internationally, he is best known for his role as Vladimir Ivanovich Korf in the television series Poor Nastya, and as Captain Lisnevsky in the film Transit.

== Early life and education ==
Daniil Strakhov was born in Moscow, He studied in an experimental "School of self-determination" of the Academy of Pedagogical Sciences (based in Moscow secondary school № 734) under the leadership of Alexander Naumovicha Tubelsky. But before entering the theater school parents hired a tutor his son - actor in Malaya Bronnaya Theatre Oleg Vavilov.

In 1993, after graduating from high school № 734 (Moscow, lilac Boulevard, 58a), Daniil entered the acting department Moscow Art Theatre School. After studying for a year-to-date avant-garde Leontiev, he transferred to the Shchukin School for a course Yevgeny Simonov.

== Career ==
In 1996, as a student of theatrical institute, Strakhov debuted in cinema, starring in a cameo in the film-grotesque Boris Blank "Career of Arturo Ui. new version" on the play by Bertolt Brecht.

In 1997, immediately after the Higher Theater School named Boris Shchukin, the actor was invited to the Moscow Drama Theater named after Gogol in the title role in Nicholas Ableukhov performance "Petersburg" based on the novel of the Russian writer Andrei Bely. In the theater of Gogol, Daniel worked for the year 1999.

From 1999 to 2001 the actor has worked with the Mossovet Theater and the Moscow Drama Theatre under the direction of Armen Jigarkhanyan.

From 2001 to 2003 years and from 2009 to the present time, Daniil fear is an actor of the Moscow Drama Theater on Malaya Bronnaya.

In 2003-2004, Strakhov played a major role (Baron Korf) in the Russian historical telenovela Poor Nastya, which brought him popularity.

In 2006, by order of the Minister of Defense of the Russian Federation "for the education of valor, patriotism and respect for the people of the military profession", Daniil Strakhov, among the entire team of the film, was awarded the medal "For Strengthening Military Cooperation" of the Ministry of Defense of the Russian Federation for the role of lieutenant Pankratova military drama "Storm the Gates". Awards to members of the cast and crew on the eve of the Victory Day celebrations gave Defense Minister Sergei Ivanov.

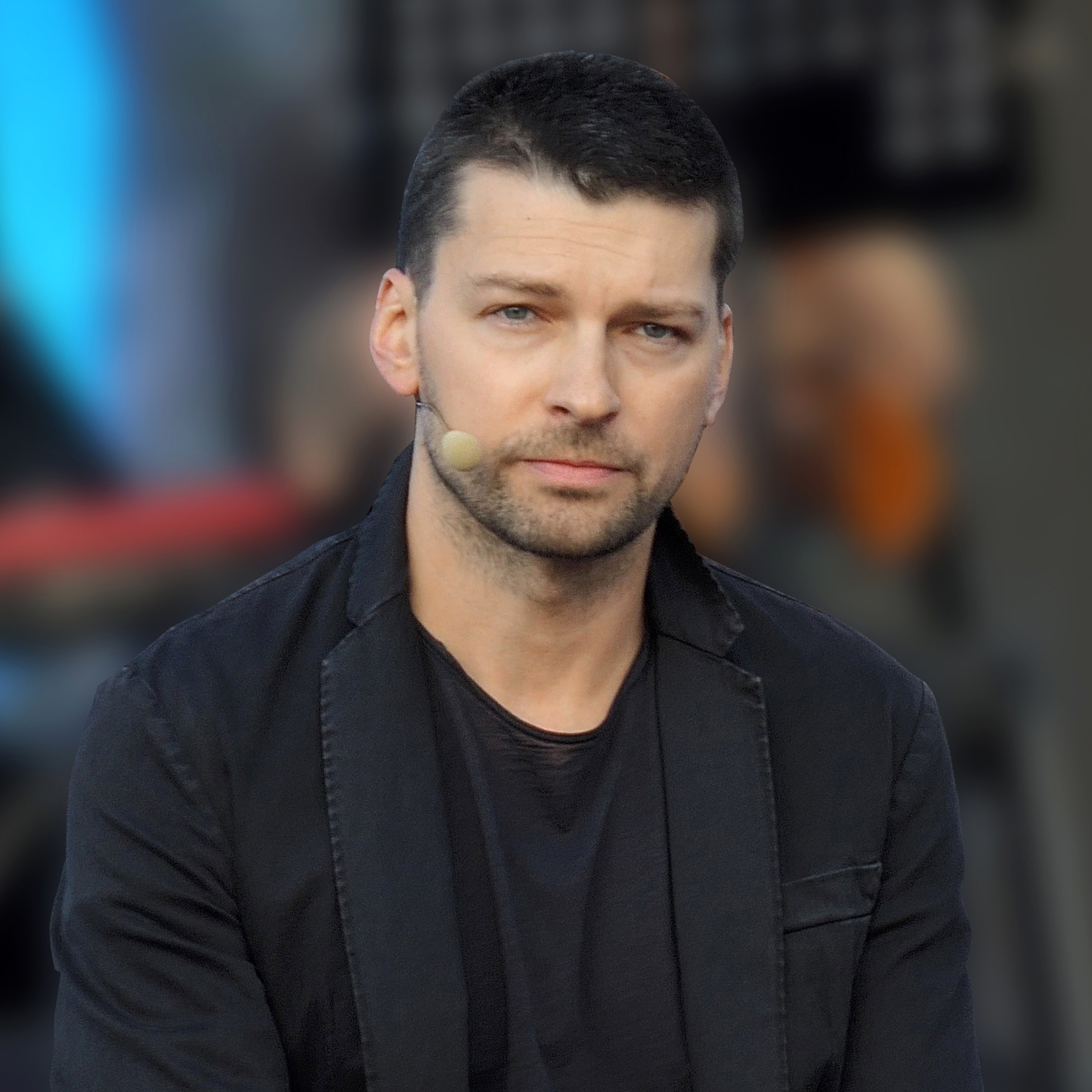
Daniil Strakhov at The East and the West film festival in Orenburg, August 2020

== Personal life ==
In 2000, Daniil Strakhov married fellow actress Maria Leonova.

== Filmography ==
Year	Title	Role	Notes
1996	Career of Arturo Ui. new version	Inna, a favorite of Ernesto Roma	
1999	Let's Get Acquainted!	Vadim	TV series
2000	Maroseyka 12: No More Bets	Tolik Shatkevich	TV
2001	New Adventures	Sergei	TV
2001	The Fifth Corner	Edik	Mini-series
2001	Northern Lights	Vadim	
2001 - 2005	Detectives	Slavik	TV series (1 season)
2002	Brigada	Vitaly Suhotsky	TV series
2002	Villisy	manager	Mini-series
2002	Main Roles	Sendi	TV series
2002	Women's Logic 2	Dmitry Tkachenko	TV
2003	Always Say Always	Dmitry Grozovsky	TV series (1 season)
2003 - 2007	Evlampiya Romanova. The Investigation Leads the Layman	Mikhail Romanov	TV series
2003	The Best City in the World	Anton	TV series
2003 - 2004	Poor Nastya	Vladimir Ivanovich Korf	TV series
2004	Always Say Always 2	Dmitry Grozovsky	TV series (2 season)
2004	Children of the Arbat	Yuri Sharok	Serial Film
2004	Zvezdochyot	Victor Kostromitin	TV series
2004	Torgashi	Nikita Ikushkin	TV series
2005	Talisman of Love	Daniil Dronov	TV series
2006	Always Say Always 3	Dmitry Grozovsky	TV series (3 season)
2006	Storm the Gates	senior lieutenant Pankratov	Mini-series
2006	Hot November	Oleg Radin	TV
2006	Transit	captain Lisnevsky	
2007	Gioconda Na Asfalte	Kirill	
2007	Lubovy Na Ostrie Nozha	Alexander Loginov	Mini-series
2007	The Model	Andrey Pozdnyshev, engineer	
2007	Trial Column	Anton Nikitin	TV series
2008	Blessed	Roman	
2008	A Game	Azis, businessman	
2008	The New Year's Rate Plan	Andrey	
2008	Black Hunters	Alexey Demin, senior lieutenant	
2009	Isaev	Vsevolod Vladimirov (Maxim Isaev)	TV series
2009	Lovushka	Stanislav German	
2009	The Justice Of Wolves	Mika / Alfred	
2011	Collectors	Vadim Streltsov, a former commando	TV series
2011	To the Edge of the World	Edward Ivolgin	TV series
2011 - 2012	Comrades Officers	Leonid, magician	TV series
2012	Apofegey	Valery Chistyakov	
2012	Zonnentau	Viktor Starostin	TV series
2013	Caesar	Denis Zvyagin, police captain	TV series
2014	Search for Clues	Artem Sergeev, an expert criminologist	TV series
2014	Cold Calculation	Igor Strelnikov, businessman	Mini-series
2014 - 2015	Leningrad 46	Boris Zemlyakov	TV series
2015	Drawing	Igor Khrustalev	Mini-series
2015	Fartsa	Gennady Shpalikov	TV series
2016	Samantha Smith’s Truth	Arthur Smith	
2016	Lady Disappear at Midnight	Artem	Mini-series
2016	Family Album		TV series
2016	Next Fighter		
2022	Amanat	Mamonov	

== Awards and nominations ==
Year	Award	Category	For	Result
1988	Moscow Debuts Awards	Best Actor	Peterburg	Won
2001	Chaika Award	Fatal Man	The Picture of Dorian Gray	Nominated
2002	International Festival of Theatre Schools	Best Actor	Fatherless	Won
2002	Youth of Century Awards	Best Actor		Nominated
2006	Constellation Festival	Special Jury Prize	Transit	Won
