= Yulia Mayboroda =

Russian actress

- Born: Yulia Alexandrovna Mayboroda; 7 November 1980 (age 45); Rostov-on-Don, Russian SFSR, Soviet Union
- Occupation: Actress
- Years active: 2005–present

Yulia Alexandrovna Mayboroda (Russian: Юлия Александровна Майборода; born 7 November 1980) is a Russian theater and film actress.

== Biography ==
Born in a family of painters. Yulia's mother — artist Elena Sadovskaya. In 2002 she graduated from the Boris Shchukin Theatre Institute (Marina Panteleeva course).

She worked in several theaters — Mark Rozovsky and Konstantin Raikin. Then Ruben Simonov Moscow Drama Theater.

In the movie — since 2005.

== Selected filmography ==
- 2005: Black Goddess (TV series) as Kamilla
- 2005: Adjutants of Love as Hortense de Beauharnais
- 2006: Who's the Boss (TV series) as Alisa
- 2007: The Sovereign's Servant as maidservant
- 2009: Крем в роли секретарши Насти
- 2010: The War Ended Yesterday (TV series) as Katya
- 2012-14: Karpov (TV series) as Svetlana Malysheva
- 2015: Interns (TV series) as Liza
- 2015 Ради любви я все смогу (сериал) в роли Лена
