= Once Upon a Time There Lived a Simple Woman =

- Directed by: Andrey Smirnov
- Written by: Andrei Smirnov
- Produced by: Elena Prudnikova; Andrei Smirnov
- Starring: Darya Ekamasova; Aleksei Serebryakov; Nina Ruslanova; Maksim Averin; Vsevolod Shilovsky; Ivan Bortnik; Vladimir Fyodorov
- Cinematography: Nikolai Ivasiv; Yury Shaygardanov
- Edited by: Alla Urazbaeva
- Production company: Rekun Cinema
- Distributed by: Nashe Kino
- Release date: October 27, 2011 (Russia)
- Running time: 156 minutes
- Country: Russia
- Language: Russian

Once Upon a Time There Lived a Simple Woman (Russian: Жила-была одна баба, romanized: Zhila-byla odna baba) is a 2011 film directed and written by Andrey Smirnov. It tells the story of a Russian peasant woman between 1909 and 1921. The film was funded by the Ministry of Culture of the Russian Federation and the Renova Group.

== Plot ==
The film is divided into two parts, and begins and ends with images of a flooded village and church under water. Varvara (played by Darya Ekamasova), a peasant woman from Tambov Governorate of the Russian Empire, is married off to a peasant man, who sexually and physically abuses her. The couple live with the husband's family at their khutor, who also treat Varvara badly. One day, her father-in-law tries to force himself on her, and she pushes him away. He strikes his head on a stone and dies. Varvara and her husband move to another khutor, quite rundown, and set about making it habitable. Varvara soon gives birth to a daughter. However, the onset of the First World War leads to turmoil – and Varvara and her child are separated from her husband. Varvara is forced from her khutor, but eventually successfully returns. However, the civil war that follows the Russian Revolution leads to much hardship. During this time, Varvara is raped more than once, but also finds solace in the arms of a kinder man. However this man and many other villagers are executed by the Red Army during the Tambov Rebellion. In the final scene of the movie, the entire village with people is flooded by water, apparently after destruction of a nearby dam, as an allegory to the Russian city of Kitezh.

== Cast ==
- Darya Ekamasova - Varvara
- Nina Ruslanova - Kryachikha
- Vladislav Abashin - Ivan
- Roman Madyanov - Little Sheep
- Maksim Averin - Alexander
- Vsevolod Shilovsky - father of Eremey
- Evdokiya Germanova - Feklusha
- Aleksei Serebryakov - Lebed
- Aleksey Shevchenkov - Malafey
- Ivan Bortnik
- Igor Klass - the old man Lykov
- Vladimir Fyodorov - fool
- Lyudmila Polyakova - Paramonovna
- Agrippina Steklova - Panka
- Vitali Kishchenko - Head of Special Department
- Yuri Shevchuk - Ishin, commander of the Antonov detachment
- Yola Sanko - the aunt Chumanykh
- Dmitry Poddubny - Ataman
- Oleg Kozhevnikov - the son of Barbara

== Director's intentions ==
Smirnov has stated that his intention in making the film was to show what really happened under Vladimir Lenin, who said he wanted to tackle the problem of "landlords and capitalists. In reality, none of these classes suffered percentage wise as much as the two most hated by Lenin, the peasantry and clergy. I really wanted to tell people about this. I am an urban dweller and it took me years to get deep into the theme of the Antonov Uprising."

In an interview with Larisa Malyukova for Novaya Gazeta in 2008, Smirnov tackled the idea of nationalism for his planned film: "I think that this motion picture should not contain a sugarcoated idealization of the nation, nor scandalous disclosures. There are pros and cons. But most importantly, it seems to me that the film has such a love for Russia in it, but not a patriot’s fanfares. Love as a synonym for pain." Regarding the cinematography, he added: "the look of the film is based on canvases of the Association of Wanderers. The frame itself dictates a style reminiscent of Myasoedov, Perov, Makovsky, and Solomatkin."

== Awards ==
The film received the Nika Award as Best Picture in 2012.
