= The Sovereign's Servant =

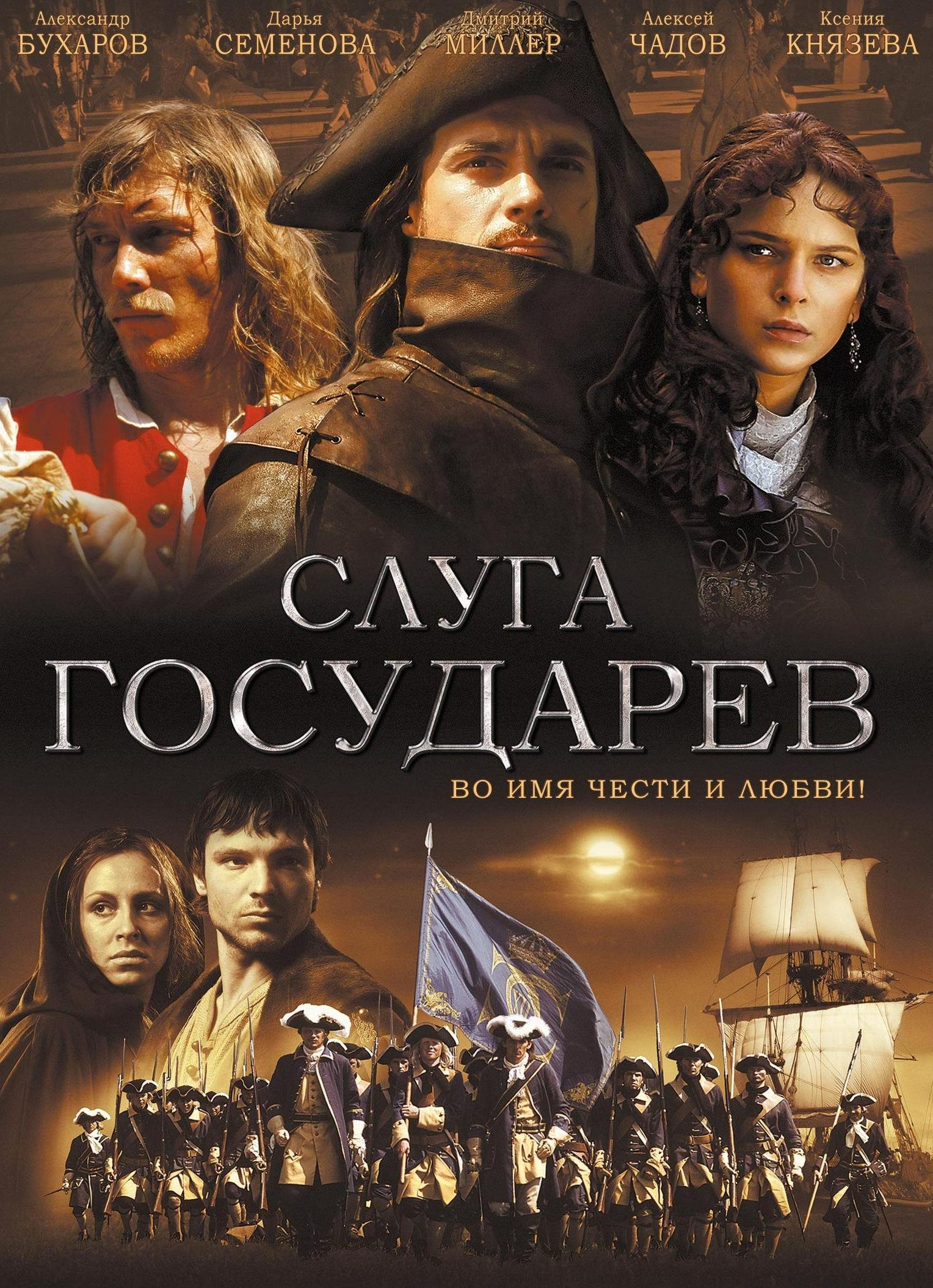
- Movie poster
- Directed by: Oleg Ryaskov
- Written by: Oleg Ryaskov
- Produced by: Evgeniy Kogan; Oleg Ryaskov
- Starring: Dmitry Miller; Aleksandr Bukharov; Kseniya Knyazeva; Darya Semyonova; Alexei Chadov; Valeriy Malikov; Nikolai Chindyajkin
- Cinematography: Dmitriy Yashonkov
- Edited by: Oleg Ryaskov
- Music by: Sergey Chekryzhov; Andrey Pisklov
- Production companies: BFT Movie; Beta Film TV
- Distributed by: Cascade film
- Release dates: February 22, 2007 (Theatrical Edition); August 18, 2022 (Director Cut)
- Running time: 131 minutes (Theatrical Edition)
- Country: Russia
- Languages: Russian, French, Swedish
- Budget: $ 6.6 million

The Sovereign's Servant (Russian: Слуга государев, romanized: Sluga Gosudarev) is a 2007 Russian swashbuckler film written and directed by Oleg Ryaskov, and starring Dmitry Miller, Aleksandr Bukharov, Kseniya Knyazeva, Darya Semyonova and Alexei Chadov in the lead roles. It depicts the events of the Great Northern War, with a particular focus on the Battle of Poltava.

== Plot ==
The film takes place during the Great Northern War of 1700-1721, focusing on the battle of Poltava. The King of France, Louis XIV, sends two duelists into exile: Antoine De La Bouche (Valery Malikov) is ordered to go to the camp of the King, Charles XII, of the Swedes and Charles de Brézé (Dmitry Miller) is sent to the camp of the Russian Tsar, Peter the First. Both Frenchmen face various dangers along their way. They witness the grand battle of Poltava from opposite sides. Court plots and romantic adventures stay in the past as both main characters are plunged head first in the boiling pot of war and the horrors it brings into their lives, until they face on the Battle of Poltava.

After the battle, Charles is injured in a final duel by De La Bouche. Then, Tsar Peter I asks Bouche about why he was exiled to Russia. He just wonders back to the past, where he and Charles prepared to be exiled. The last scene sets back to the past, when both went to Russia.

== Cast ==
- Dmitry Miller as Charles de Breze
- Aleksandr Bukharov (actor) as Grigoriy Voronov
- Kseniya Knyazeva as Sharlotta de Monterras
- Darya Semyonova as Anka
- Alexei Chadov as Angie
- Valeriy Malikov as Antoine de La Bouche
- Nikolai Chindyajkin as Polish Coaching Inn Keep
- Andrey Sukhov as Peter the Great
- Vladislav Demchenko as Prince Philipp
- Dmitry Shilyayev as King Louis XIV
- Andrey Ryklin as Alexander Menshikov
- Rodion Yurin as Count de Guiche
- Yelena Plaksina as Praskoviya
- Ivan Shibanov as Marquise von Shomberg
- Olga Artngoltz as Marquise Gretchen von Shomberg
- Eduard Flerov as King Charles XII
- Mariya Kozhevnikova as maidservant
- Yulia Mayboroda as maidservant
- Evgeny Menshov as usher

== Release ==
The Sovereign's Servant was released in more than 20 countries, including: Brazil, Portugal, Spain, Italy, Germany, Netherlands, Sweden, Finland, Denmark, France, Estonia, Latvia, Lithuania, Ukraine, Poland, United Arab Emirates, Australia, Israel.

A Director Cut was released on August 18, 2022.

=== Box office ===
- Fees in Russia - $6.800.000 US (theaters, TV and DVD)
- Fees in the World - $5.100.000 US (theaters, TV and DVD)
- Fees total of - $11.900.000 US (theaters, TV and DVD)
- The budget is - $6.600.000 US
- Advertising - $2.700.000 US (Russia)
- Copies - 385 (Russia)
