= Poor Nastya =

- Бедная Настя
- Developed by: Aleksandr Smirnov
- Starring: Elena Korikova; Daniil Strakhov; Pyotr Krasilov; Dimitri Isayev; Olga Ostroumova; Ekaterina Klimova
- Composer: Irina Tumanova
- Country of origin: Russia
- No. of seasons: 1
- No. of episodes: 127

Production
- Production locations: Moscow, Russia; St. Petersburg, Russia
- Running time: 40 minutes

Original release
- Network: Russia STS; Ukraine 1+1
- Release: 31 October 2003 – 30 April 2004

Poor Nastya (Russian: Бедная Настя, Bednaya Nastya) is a Russian telenovela originally aired in the Russian Federation from 31 October 2003 to 30 April 2004 on STS, and in Ukraine from 10 November 2003 to 7 May 2004 on 1+1. Set in 19th century imperial Russia, the series achieved international success and was shown in China, Israel, Serbia, Kazakhstan, Georgia, Greece, Bulgaria and more than twenty countries worldwide. With a budget of $11.8 million, it is the most expensive Russian television project so far. A sequel was planned, but never produced.

== Cast ==
=== Fictional characters ===
- Elena Korikova as Anna Platonova, the female protagonist. Anna is the illegitimate daughter of Prince Pyotr Mikhailovich Dolgoruky and his servant Marfa and was hidden in the house of her father's old friend, Baron Ivan Ivanovich Korff. Baron Korff brought her up like his own daughter, much to the seeming displeasure of his son Vladimir. But her legal status is a serf. Anna falls in love with Vladimir's best friend Mikhail Repnin, but their relationship is constantly disturbed by Vladimir, who has also fallen for Anna. Finally, it is discovered Anna's real name is actually Anastasia Petrovna Dolgorukaya and she marries Vladimir.
- Daniil Strakhov as Baron Vladimir Ivanovich Korff, the male protagonist, sometimes shown as antagonist. In the beginning, he is attracted by Princess Liza Dolgorukaya, but then becomes involved with Olga Kalinowska, lady-in-waiting. He has a duel with Tsarevich Alexander and is condemned to death, but later saved by the Tsarevich. Vladimir is jealous of Misha's relationship with Anna, but finally marries her.
- Pyotr Krasilov as Prince Mikhail Alexandrovich Repnin, Vladimir's best friend. He falls in love with Anna, but their relationship is constantly disturbed by Vladimir, who also loves Anna. Misha eventually falls in love with Liza Dolgorukaya and marries her.
- Ekaterina Klimova as Princess Natalia Alexandrovna Repnina, Misha's sister and the fiancée of Andrey Dolgoruky. She leaves him after finding out he is the father of Tatyana's child. During the series, it is indicated Natalia has fallen in love with Prince Alexander, who has previously fallen in love with her and tried to seduce her. After Andrey is killed by accident, Natalia ends up alone, as Alexander decides to marry Princess Maria Alexandrovna.
- Emmanuil Vitorgan as Prince Pyotr Mikhailovich Dolgoruky, the husband of Maria Alexeevna and Anna's (Nastya) biological father, who is believed to be dead.
- Olga Ostroumova as Princess Maria Alexeevna Dolgorukaya, the antagonist of the series. She is the mother of Andrey, Liza and Sonya and the wife of Anna's (Nastya) biological father Pyotr Mikhailovich Dolgoruky. Maria is aware of Pyotr's relationship with servant Marfa and despises Ivan Ivanovich Korff, who helped them to hide their relationship. After Ivan Ivanovich dies, Maria Alexeevna continues a dispute with his son Vladimir.
- Aleksandr Filippenko as Andrey Platonovich Zabaluev, the male antagonist. Liza is forced to marry him, but they eventually divorce.
- Larisa Shakhvorostova as Marfa, the lover of Pyotr Mikhailovich Dolgoruky and the biological mother of Anna (Nastya).
- Anton Makarskiy as Prince Andrey Petrovich Dolgoruky, the son of Maria Alexeevna Dolgorukaya and the fiancée of Natalia Repnina. He, however, sleeps with his servant Tatyana and finds out she is pregnant. Andrey is accidentally killed by his mother, who wanted to kill Vladimir.
- Anna Tabanina as Princess Elizaveta "Liza" Petrovna Dolgorukaya, the daughter of Maria Alexeevna Dolgorukaya. She is in love with her childhood sweetheart Vladimir, but is forced to marry an old aristocrat, Andrey Platonovich Zabaluev. The two later divorce and Liza falls in love with Misha and marries him.
- Lyudmila Kurepova as Princess Sonya Petrovna Dolgorukaya, the youngest daughter of Maria Alexeevna Dolgorukaya. She has a brief romance with Nikita.
- Albert Filozov as Baron Ivan Ivanovich Korff, Vladimir's father who raised Anna as his own daughter. He is poisoned by Maria Alexeevna, Zabaluev and Karl Modestovich.
- Igor Dmitriev as Prince Sergey Stepanovich Obolensky, the manager of the Imperial Theatre in St. Petersburg.
- Svetlana Toma as Sychikha, Vladimir's aunt who lives in the wood and is believed to be a witch. Vladimir despises her, as he believes she is responsible for the death of his mother.
- Nina Usatova as Varvara, the servant in the Korff Manor.
- Dmitriy Shevchenko as Karl Modestovich Schüller, the steward of the Korff Manor, and one of the antagonists. He helped Maria Alexeevna and Zabaluev to appropriate the Korff Manor.
- Anna Gorshkova as Polina Penkova, the servant in the Korff Manor, jealous of Anna.
- Alexei Osipov/Ilya Sokolovskiy as Nikita Khvorostov, the servant in the Korff Manor, in love with Anna. He later has a brief romance with Sonya Dolgorukaya.
- Olga Syomina as Tatyana "Tanya" Veryovkina, the servant in the Dolgoruky Manor. She is in love with Andrey Dolgoruky and eventually gives birth to his child.
- Alexander Dzyuba as Sedoy, a Gypsy.
- Teona Dolnikova as Rada, a Gypsy girl.

=== Historical characters ===
- Viktor Verzhbitsky as Emperor Nicholas I, the Emperor of Russia.
- Alexander Kalyagin as Vasily Andreevich Zhukovsky, the Counselor of the Emperor of Russia.
- Alyona Bondarchuk as Empress Alexandra Feodorovna, the Empress of Russia.
- Dimitri Isayev as Tsarevich Alexander Nikolayevich, the Heir to the Russian throne. His father does not approve his behaviour.
- Marina Aleksandrova as Princess Maria Alexandrovna, Alexander's fiancée from Hesse.
- Marina Kazankova as Olga Kalinowska, Alexander's former lover. Vladimir and Alexander organized a duel over her, but eventually became friends. Olga is sent in a monastery in Poland and later marries an old Polish aristocrat.

== Dubbing in Romanian ==
- Valentina Fătu as Anna Platonova, the female protagonist. Anna is the illegitimate daughter of Prince Pyotr Mikhailovich Dolgoruky and his servant Marfa and was hidden in the house of her father's old friend, Baron Ivan Ivanovich Korff. Baron Korff brought her up like his own daughter, much to the seeming displeasure of his son Vladimir. But her legal status is a serf. Anna falls in love with Vladimir's best friend Mikhail Repnin, but their relationship is constantly disturbed by Vladimir, who has also fallen for Anna. Finally, it is discovered Anna's real name is actually Anastasia Petrovna Dolgorukaya and she marries Vladimir.
- Dorin Andone as Baron Vladimir Ivanovich Korff, the male protagonist, sometimes shown as antagonist. In the beginning, he is attracted by Princess Liza Dolgorukaya, but then becomes involved with Olga Kalinowska, lady-in-waiting. He has a duel with Tsarevich Alexander and is condemned to death, but later saved by the Tsarevich. Vladimir is jealous of Misha's relationship with Anna, but finally marries her.
- Radu Botar as Prince Mikhail Alexandrovich Repnin, Vladimir's best friend. He falls in love with Anna, but their relationship is constantly disturbed by Vladimir, who also loves Anna. Misha eventually falls in love with Liza Dolgorukaya and marries her.
- Emilia Popescu as Princess Natalia Alexandrovna Repnina, Misha's sister and the fiancée of Andrey Dolgoruky. She leaves him after finding out he is the father of Tatyana's child. During the series, it is indicated Natalia has fallen in love with Prince Alexander, who has previously fallen in love with her and tried to seduce her. After Andrey is killed by accident, Natalia ends up alone, as Alexander decides to marry Princess Maria Alexandrovna.
- Mihai Dinvale as Prince Pyotr Mikhailovich Dolgoruky, the husband of Maria Alexeevna and Anna's (Nastya) biological father, who is believed to be dead.
- Catrinel Dumitrescu as Princess Maria Alexeevna Dolgorukaya, the antagonist of the series. She is the mother of Andrey, Liza and Sonya and the wife of Anna's (Nastya) biological father Pyotr Mikhailovich Dolgoruky. Maria is aware of Pyotr's relationship with servant Marfa and despises Ivan Ivanovich Korff, who helped them to hide their relationship. After Ivan Ivanovich dies, Maria Alexeevna continues a dispute with his son Vladimir.
- Denis Ștefan as Andrey Platonovich Zabaluev, the male antagonist. Liza is forced to marry him, but they eventually divorce.
- Carmen Tănase as Marfa, the lover of Pyotr Mikhailovich Dolgoruky and the biological mother of Anna (Nastya).
- Vlad Ivanov as Prince Andrey Petrovich Dolgoruky, the son of Maria Alexeevna Dolgorukaya and the fiancée of Natalia Repnina. He, however, sleeps with his servant Tatyana and finds out she is pregnant. Andrey is accidentally killed by his mother, who wanted to kill Vladimir.
- Ioana Ginghină as Princess Elizaveta "Liza" Petrovna Dolgorukaya, the daughter of Maria Alexeevna Dolgorukaya. She is in love with her childhood sweetheart Vladimir, but is forced to marry an old aristocrat, Andrey Platonovich Zabaluev. The two later divorce and Liza falls in love with Misha and marries him.
- Alina Chivulescu as Princess Sonya Petrovna Dolgorukaya, the youngest daughter of Maria Alexeevna Dolgorukaya. She has a brief romance with Nikita.
- Gheorghe Dinică as Baron Ivan Ivanovich Korff, Vladimir's father who raised Anna as his own daughter. He is poisoned by Maria Alexeevna, Zabaluev and Karl Modestovich.
- Ion Săsăran as Prince Sergey Stepanovich Obolensky, the manager of the Imperial Theatre in St. Petersburg.
- Ioana Drăgan as Sychikha, Vladimir's aunt who lives in the wood and is believed to be a witch. Vladimir despises her, as he believes she is responsible for the death of his mother.
- Virginia Rogin as Varvara, the servant in the Korff Manor.
- Ion Caramitru as Karl Modestovich Schüller, the steward of the Korff Manor, and one of the antagonists. He helped Maria Alexeevna and Zabaluev to appropriate the Korff Manor.
- Anca Florescu as Polina Penkova, the servant in the Korff Manor, jealous of Anna.
- Ovidiu Ghiniță/Pavel Bartoș as Nikita Khvorostov, the servant in the Korff Manor, in love with Anna. He later has a brief romance with Sonya Dolgorukaya.
- Veronica Gheorghe as Tatyana "Tanya" Veryovkina, the servant in the Dolgoruky Manor. She is in love with Andrey Dolgoruky and eventually gives birth to his child.
- Radu Bânzaru as Sedoy, a Gypsy.
- Laura Vasiliu as Rada, a Gypsy girl.
- Constantin Cotimanis/Alexandru Papadopol as Narrator

=== Historical characters ===
- Marcel Iureș as Emperor Nicholas I, the Emperor of Russia.
- Gheorghe Visu as Vasily Andreevich Zhukovsky, the Counselor of the Emperor of Russia.
- Cezara Dafinescu as Empress Alexandra Feodorovna, the Empress of Russia.
- Mihai Donțu as Tsarevich Alexander Nikolayevich, the Heir to the Russian throne. His father does not approve his behaviour.
- Anca Sigartău as Princess Maria Alexandrovna, Alexander's fiancée from Hesse.
- Sabina Brândușe as Olga Kalinowska, Alexander's former lover. Vladimir and Alexander organized a duel over her, but eventually became friends. Olga is sent in a monastery in Poland and later marries an old Polish aristocrat.

== Sequel ==
The sequel Poor Nastya 2 was planned, as it was noted at the end of the Poor Nastya. A promo video was shown on television and at the YouTube in 2006. However, a sequel has not been made yet. In 2006, Daniil Strakhov stated he doubted it would be made, as it is "impossible to gather all the actors after three years."
